= Borderite Stadium =

Stadium in Blaine High School, Washington

- Former names: Blaine High School Stadium (1950-1960)
- Address: 1135 Boblett St. Blaine, Washington; U.S.
- Operator: Blaine School District
- Seating type: Bleachers
- Capacity: 2,056
- Surface: Grass (1950-2019) FieldTurf Revolution 360 (2019-present)
- Record attendance: 3,902 (November 30, 1978 Football State semi-final vs Eatonville)

Construction
- Opened: September 1, 1950
- Renovated: Began April 6, 2019, ended August 12, 2021

Tenant
- Blaine Borderites Athletics (WIAA NWC Conference) 1950-present

Borderite Stadium is an outdoor multipurpose stadium in the Northwestern United States, located on the campus of Blaine High School in Blaine, Washington. The stadium is located less than a mile from the US-Canada border. It is the main home of all of Blaine School District's outdoor athletics and includes an all-turf football field along with an Olympic-sized track. The stadium was originally grass and track, until a complete renovation that began in 2019.

The stadium is the second-largest sporting venue in Whatcom County, just behind Civic Stadium in Bellingham, that seats 3,800 people. Due to its large capacity, Borderite Stadium hosts track meets and other county/state-large events because it can accommodate such vast amounts of people. The venue is also where Blaine High School hosts their yearly graduation ceremony.

== History ==
Borderite Stadium, originally called Blaine High School Stadium, was first built in 1950, but became what it is more known as today after the renovations in the early 2020s. The stadium was built to serve as the high school's main athletic facility and it still serves that purpose to this date, as all of the teams that Blaine High School fields plays there if their sport requires it.

On November 30, 1978, the stadium set an attendance record that still has not been broken to this date. The Blaine High School football team faced Eatonville in the Washington State Tournament. At the time it was the most attended sporting event in Whatcom County, until that record was broken just a year later. The Borderites won the game 39–8 led by head coach Jack Irion as they advanced to their first and only state championship game appearance, which they won against Granger by a score of 20–7. The 1978 season is often referred to as the best in the school's history, ending the season with a record of 11–2.

The stadium began its most recent remodel in 2019, when they fully replaced the bleachers moving them from one side of the field to the other, and replaced the grass field surface with synthetic turf, specifically FieldTurf Revolution 360, for more optimal use. This renovation coincided with the remodel of the actual high school, which was rebuilt to accommodate more students, due to the city's growing population.

In 2022, the stadium served as an alternate venue for the Simon Fraser Red Leafs football team for the 2022 season, while they competed in the NCAA Division II football conference known as the Lone Star Conference. This venue was used for various reasons including the COVID-19 pandemic and the vaccination mandates surrounding the pandemic.
