= Carlos Becerra (actor) =

American actor, producer and entrepreneur

- Born: July 12, 1991 (age 34); Bellingham, Washington, U.S.
- Occupations: Actor; producer; Entrepreneur
- Years active: 2017–present
- Family: Pedro Becerra Sr.

Carlos Becerra (born July 12, 1991) is an American actor, producer and entrepreneur. Becerra debuted as the host of Discovery Channel TV series Carspotting, appearing with his brother, Pedro Becerra Jr., and Niko Weaver, as they fixed-up older and unused cars for resale.

== Early life ==
Becerra is the host of Carspotting and runs several businesses, including Imports & Classics, which was the focus of the series.

As a teenager, Becerra attended and graduated from Blaine High School in Blaine, Washington. According to an interview with The Bellingham Herald, he had worked in berry fields in his youth, selling the harvest directly from his own stand. After graduating from high school, he started buying cars and shipping them out-of-state. Becerra also stated to the news outlet that he had "…been a car guy my whole life ... Whatcom County is full of old cars. You drive around the backroads and you see a lot of cars by barns or sitting in fields."

== See also ==
- List of people from Washington (state)
