= Blaine High School =

Blaine High School may refer to:

- Blaine High School (Minnesota), United States
- Blaine High School (Washington), United States
