= Lily Point Marine Reserve =

Location of a United States military reserve

- Location within Washington (state)
- Location: Point Roberts, Washington
- Coordinates: 48°58′39″N 123°01′35″W
- Area: 275 acres (111 ha)
- Established: 2008

Lily Point Marine Reserve is a park and marine reserve located within the southeastern portion of Point Roberts, Washington. It encompasses more than 275 acres (111 ha), with 1.4 miles (2.3 km) of saltwater shoreline along Boundary Bay.

In 2008, Whatcom County acquired this property with the assistance of The Nature Conservancy and Whatcom Land Trust. Major goals in the planning process for the park include the preservation of the site's natural and cultural heritage and public access. Proposed improvements include a trailhead with parking and restrooms, trails through forested uplands, viewpoints and shoreline access.

== Ecology and geology ==
Lily Point encompasses over 275 acres of forested upland bluffs, beaches, and rich tidelands. It is known locally for its many forest, cliff-hugging and beach access trails.

Lily Point hosts a dynamic assembly of ecological processes - reefs and tidelands swept by nutrient filled currents, riparian forests providing shade, perches, and insects to the coastal environment, and eroding cliffs supplying sand and gravel for spawning substrate and beach replenishment. These processes are essential to the health of Puget Sound - the orca that patrol the Straights of Georgia, salmon that skirt Lily Point on their way to the Fraser and Nooksack Rivers, bald eagles that scour the beach, great blue herons that stalk the tidelands, and waterfowl and shore birds that visit Boundary Bay. At a low tide in June, a delegation from the Land Trust saw nearly 100 eagles on the beach at Lily Point.

Lily Point's strategic location, its relatively large undeveloped and natural shoreline, and its combination of mature upland forests, riparian vegetation, feeder cliffs, and ecologically abundant tidelands give this project regional and international significance. Providing spawning substrate for forage fish utilized by juvenile Chinook salmon, Lily Point is identified as a priority protection site in the Puget Sound Action Team Recovery Plan. The Nature Conservancy includes Lily Point as "Priority Conservation Area" because of the site's exceptional and regionally important ecological values. Boundary Bay, whose ecological health is directly linked to Lily Point, is recognized as an Important Bird Area by BirdLife International, as a Western Hemisphere Shorebird Reserve Network site (WHSRN), and as a U.N. wetland of international importance especially for waterfowl (Ramsar site).

== History ==
Point Roberts formed from the sand and gravel outwash of retreating glaciers 15,000 years ago. The highest reach of this glacial deposit, some 200 feet above the sea at the southeast corner of Point Roberts, is Lily Point, or, in Native Salish language Chelhtenem, "hang salmon for drying."

Lily Point was the most important Native reef net fishery and one of the most significant salmon fisheries of the Central Coast Salish. In 1889, 16 Native reef nets were in operation, and a single net would catch as many as 2,000 fish a day. A newspaper reported in 1881 that three reef nets took 10,000 fish in six hours.

For many centuries Chelhtenem was a center of traditional salmon culture and a place of great spiritual power for Native Peoples. The First Salmon Ceremony honored the returning salmon and directed them into the reef nets. The bones of the first fish were carefully returned to the sea where the fish regained its form and told other salmon how well it had been treated, thus allowing the capture of other fish and insuring a return the following year.

=== 19th and 20th centuries ===
In the late 19th century, non-Indian fish traps displaced traditional reef nets. Alaska Packers purchased a year-old cannery at Lily Point in 1884. The cannery was abandoned in 1917, leaving pilings and debris still visible today. Chelhtenem was added to the National Register of Historical Places in 1994 as a site of National Cultural, Traditional and Spiritual Significance, the second place in Washington State receiving such a designation.

=== Present ===
After Welsh Development, Inc. acquired Lily Point, Whatcom County approved a major development for condominiums, a golf course, 74 residential lots, and a regional recreational resort on properties including Lily Point. For reasons unknown, the developer allowed the permits to expire in 2003 without beginning construction. It was placed back on the market and eventually purchased again in 2008 with plans to turn it into a park and marine reserve.

The site is known for numerous eagles, heron, and loons. In addition, some of the largest migratory salmon runs have come to this point as they make passage to the Fraser River. In addition, the area is abundant in clams and crabs, and features a rich marine ecosystem. Indeed, Chelhtenem has changed little in historic period; it still reflects the landforms, vegetation, and water resources that attracted and sustained the original inhabitants and their descendants.
