= Bob Robertson (announcer) =

American sportscaster (1929–2020)

- Born: March 14, 1929; Fullerton, California, U.S.
- Died: September 6, 2020 (aged 91); University Place, Washington, U.S.
- Education: Blaine High School; Western Washington (attended)
- Occupation: Sportscaster
- Years active: 1948–2018
- Known for: Washington State Cougars football and basketball Minor league baseball
- Spouse(s): Joanne (m. 1952–2011, her death)
- Children: 4
- Sports commentary career
- Genre: Play-by-play

Bob Robertson (March 14, 1929 – September 6, 2020) was an American sportscaster, best known for covering Washington State University football from 1964–68 and 1972–2018, and WSU basketball from 1972–1994. He was also play-by-play announcer for Tacoma's Pacific Coast League team, and one of the last to recreate play-by-play from the studio while the team was on the road. He was the full-time radio announcer for the Spokane Indians of the Northwest League from 1999 to 2010, and called occasional games in 2012.

Robertson was born in Fullerton, California, while his father was at spring training as a baseball player with the Seattle Indians of the Pacific Coast League. He grew up in Canada (Vancouver, Saskatoon) and northwestern Washington (Point Roberts); he graduated from Blaine High School, where he played football and baseball.

After attending Western Washington State College in Bellingham and calling minor league baseball games for the Wenatchee Chiefs of the Western International League, Robertson left the Pacific Northwest in 1955 to be the football announcer for Notre Dame's school-run television station.

In 1964, Robertson began his work with WSU football, leaving briefly to announce for the rival Washington Huskies of Seattle from 1969–1971. He returned to WSU in 1972, where he worked both football and basketball games.

During his 70-year career, Robertson also covered the Seattle Rainiers, Seattle Totems, Seattle Sounders, Portland Timbers, Seattle University men's basketball, Pacific Lutheran University men's and women's basketball, as well as table tennis, hydroplane racing, roller derby, boxing, rodeo, and high school athletics. He called three games for the Seattle Mariners in 1992.

Robertson was known for his sign off "Always be a good sport, be a good sport all ways." In 2011, he was replaced as play-by-play announcer, but remained on the football broadcasts as an analyst.

On October 15, 2018, Robertson announced his retirement from Washington State with immediate effect. He died at his home in University Place, Washington, on September 6, 2020, at age 91.

== Honors ==
• 2004: Chris Schenkel Award from the College Football Hall of Fame.
• 2006: Inducted into the Washington State University Athletics Hall of Fame.
• 2007: Inducted into the Washington Sports Hall of Fame.
• 2009: The press box at WSU's Martin Stadium was named in his honor.
• 2011: The press box at Spokane's Avista Stadium was named in his honor.
• Named the state of Washington's Sportscaster of the Year 12 times.
