= MV Plover =

- MV Plover (ferry)
- U.S. National Register of Historic Places
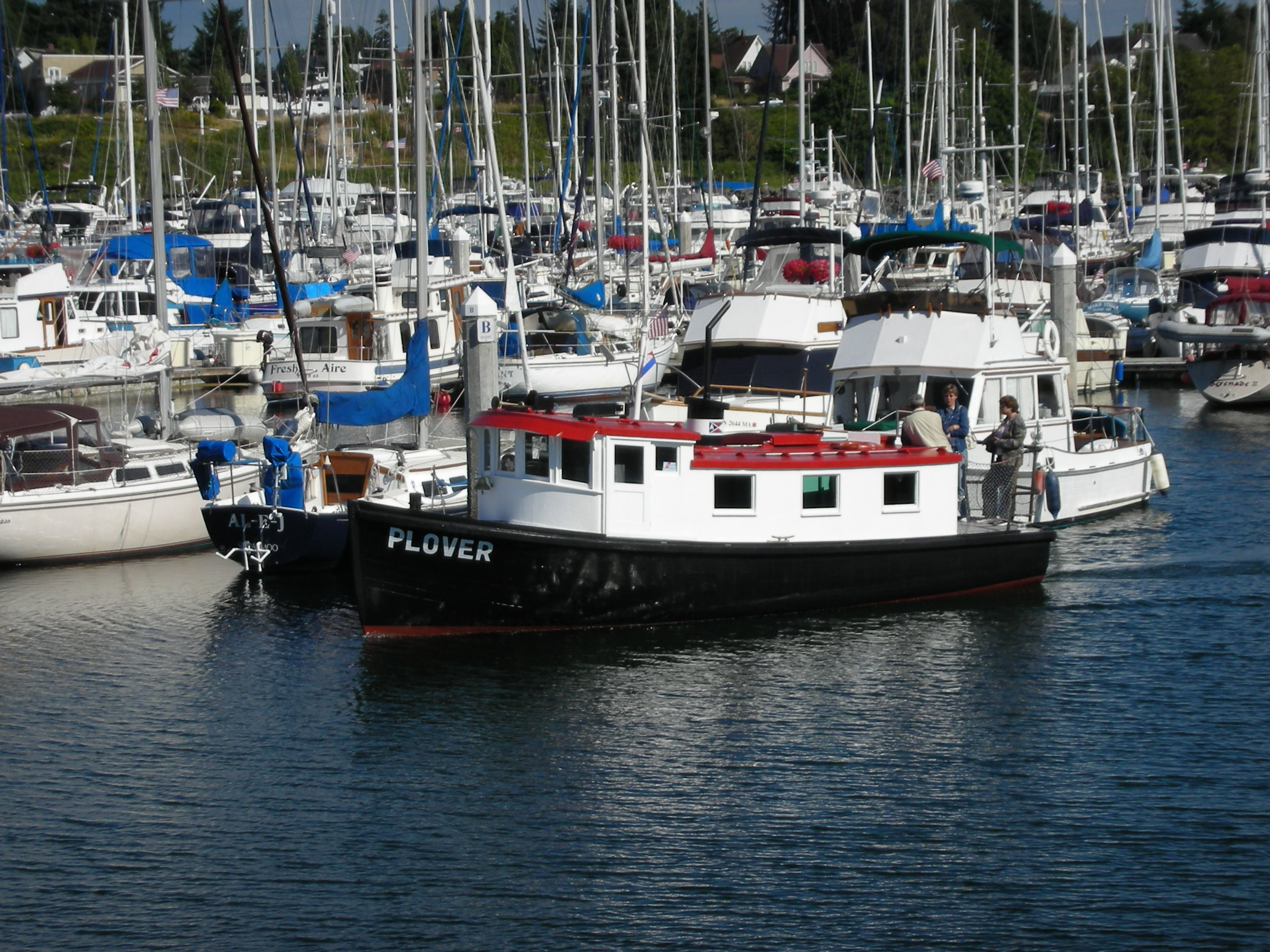

- Location within Washington (state) Location within the United States
- Location: 245 Marine Dr.; Blaine Harbor Berth A-11, Blaine, WA
- Coordinates: 48°59′38″N 122°45′31″W
- Built: 1944, Bryants Marina Inc., Seattle
- NRHP reference No.: 97000551
- Added to NRHP: June 4, 1997

MV Plover is an 11-ton, 17-passenger ferry in Whatcom County, Washington, built in 1944, listed on the National Register of Historic Places in 1997. She is owned and operated by the City of Blaine, Washington. She originally ferried workers from Blaine to the Alaska Packers' Association cannery at Semiahmoo Spit (now the site of Semiahmoo Resort), carrying out this function until 1964. She was restored by volunteers of Whatcom Maritime Historical Society, and now carries passengers during the summer months from the Blaine harbor dock across Drayton Harbor to the resort dock. At approximately 1 kilometer, this is claimed to be the shortest ferry run in Washington. She is the second oldest operating foot passenger ferry in Washington, next to Kitsap Transit's Carlisle II which was built in Bellingham 27 years earlier, in 1917.

In 1998, the Plover restoration was recognized by the Washington State Department of Archaeology and Historic Preservation as demonstrating "the best of preservation practice" with a Valerie Sivinski Award for Outstanding Achievement in Historic Preservation Rehabilitation Projects.
