= Point Roberts, Washington =

- Census-designated place
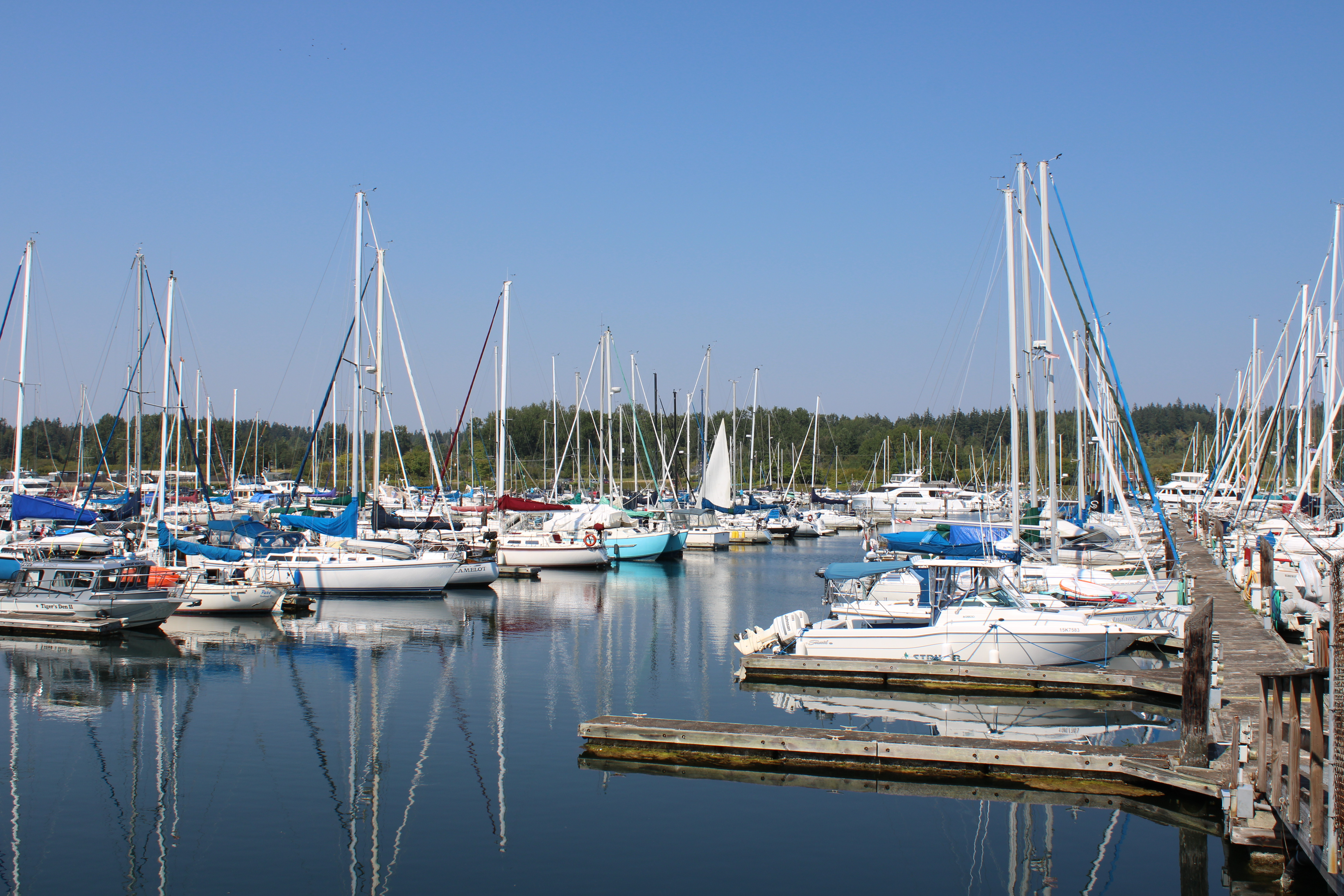
- Point Roberts Marina Resort
- Nicknames: Point Bob
- Interactive location map of Point Roberts
- Coordinates: 48°59′11″N 123°03′25″W
- Country: United States
- State: Washington
- County: Whatcom
- Established: June 15, 1846

Area
  - Total: 4.884 sq mi (12.65 km^{2})
- Elevation: 121 ft (37 m)

Population (2020)
  - Total: 1,191
  - Estimate (2022): 1,249
  - Density: 240/sq mi (94/km^{2})
- Time zone: UTC−08:00 (PST)
  - Summer (DST): UTC−07:00 (PDT)
- ZIP Code: 98281
- Area code(s): 360, 564
- GNIS feature ID: 2586745
- Website: Point Roberts Chamber of Commerce

Point Roberts is a pene-exclave of the US state of Washington on the southernmost tip of the Tsawwassen peninsula, south of Vancouver, British Columbia, Canada. The area, which had a population of 1,191 at the 2020 census, is reached from the rest of the United States by traveling 25 mi (40 km) through Canada, or without passing through Canada by boat or private airplane. It is a census-designated place in Whatcom County, Washington, with a post office, and a ZIP Code of 98281. Direct sea and air connections with the rest of the U.S. are available across Boundary Bay.

Point Roberts was created when the United Kingdom and the United States settled the Pacific Northwest American–Canadian border dispute in the mid-19th century with the Oregon Treaty. The two parties agreed that the 49th parallel would define the boundary between their respective territories, and the small area that incorporates Point Roberts is south of the 49th parallel. Questions about ceding the territory to the United Kingdom and later to Canada have been raised since its creation; however, its status has remained unchanged.

== History ==
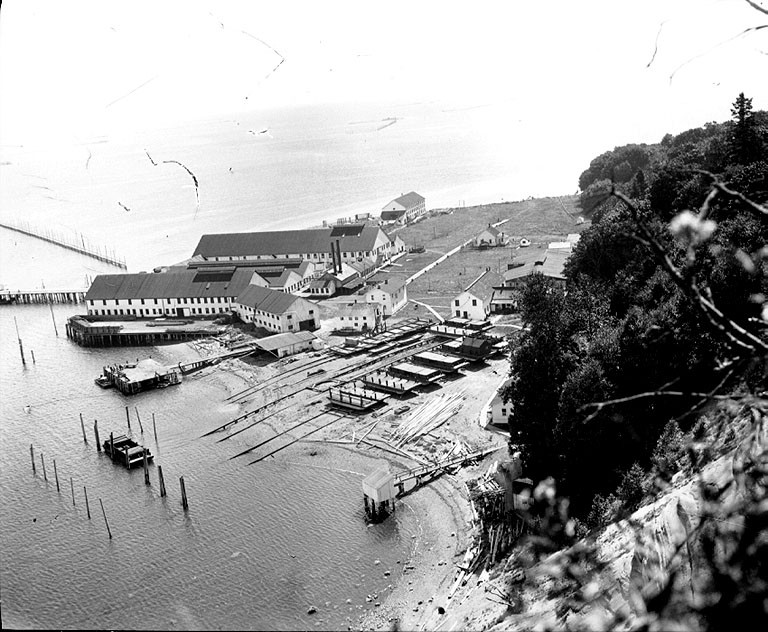
The Point Roberts cannery c. 1918

The area around the southern Tsawwassen Peninsula was a favored fishing spot for several Coast Salish groups. The first Europeans to see Point Roberts were members of the 1791 expedition of Francisco de Eliza. The maps produced from Eliza's explorations depicted Point Roberts as "Isla de Cepeda" or "Isla de Zepeda." In 1792, the British expedition of George Vancouver and the Spanish expedition of Dionisio Alcalá Galiano encountered one another near Point Roberts. In the morning of June 13, 1792, the two ships under Galiano sailed into Boundary Bay and verified Point Roberts was not an island, which was thus renamed Punta Cepeda. They then sailed around Point Roberts and immediately encountered HMS Chatham, the second ship of Vancouver's expedition. The two parties made contact and agreed to share information and work together in mapping the Strait of Georgia.

Point Roberts acquired its present name from George Vancouver, who named it after his friend Henry Roberts, who had originally been given command of the expedition. Point Roberts assumed its present political status in 1846, when the Oregon Treaty extended the 49th parallel as the boundary between U.S. and British territory from the Rocky Mountains to Georgia Strait.

=== Treaty history specific to Point Roberts ===
After years of joint occupation of the disputed area between Mexican California and Russian America (now Alaska) known as the Oregon Country to the Americans, and as the Columbia District to the British, American expansionists like U.S. Senator Edward A. Hannegan of Indiana urged U.S. President James K. Polk to annex the entire Oregon Country up to latitude 54°40′N, as the Democrats had been elected on the slogan "Fifty-Four Forty or Fight".

While his government asserted that the title of the United States of America to the entire territory was unquestionable even though there was only one U.S. resident (a former Briton) north of the Columbia basin, Polk and Secretary of State James Buchanan made an offer of a boundary at 49 degrees with the line straight across Vancouver Island, with no commercial privilege to be granted to the British south of the line, with the exception of free ports on Vancouver Island. The British rejected the offer and the U.S. soon withdrew it.

On April 18, 1846, notice was forwarded to London that the U.S. Congress had adopted a joint resolution abrogating the Treaty of 1818 which provided for joint occupancy.

The British emissary, Richard Pakenham, had been advised that the last concession he could expect of the United States was to bend the boundary at the 49th parallel around the southern end of Vancouver Island. Fort Victoria was viewed as the future center for settlements on the island. It was deemed necessary around this point in time to give up territory on the Lower Mainland to keep Vancouver Island part of British North America.

Lord Aberdeen, British Foreign Secretary, proposed a treaty making the 49th parallel the boundary to the sea, giving the U.K. the whole of Vancouver Island. The Treaty of Oregon was concluded on June 15, 1846.

The acceptance of the 49th parallel as the international boundary was concluded without precise knowledge of its effects. Later, as the Boundary Commission surveyed the line, the British government realized the peninsula of Point Roberts would be an isolated part of the United States. The British Foreign Office instructed Captain James Prevost, the British Boundary Commissioner, to inform his U.S. counterpart of the situation and request Point Roberts be left to Britain, because of the great inconvenience it would be to the United States. If the American Boundary Commission was reluctant, Prevost was instructed to offer "some equivalent compensation by a slight alteration of the Line of Boundary on the Mainland". It is not known how the U.S. commissioner responded, but Point Roberts remained part of the United States.

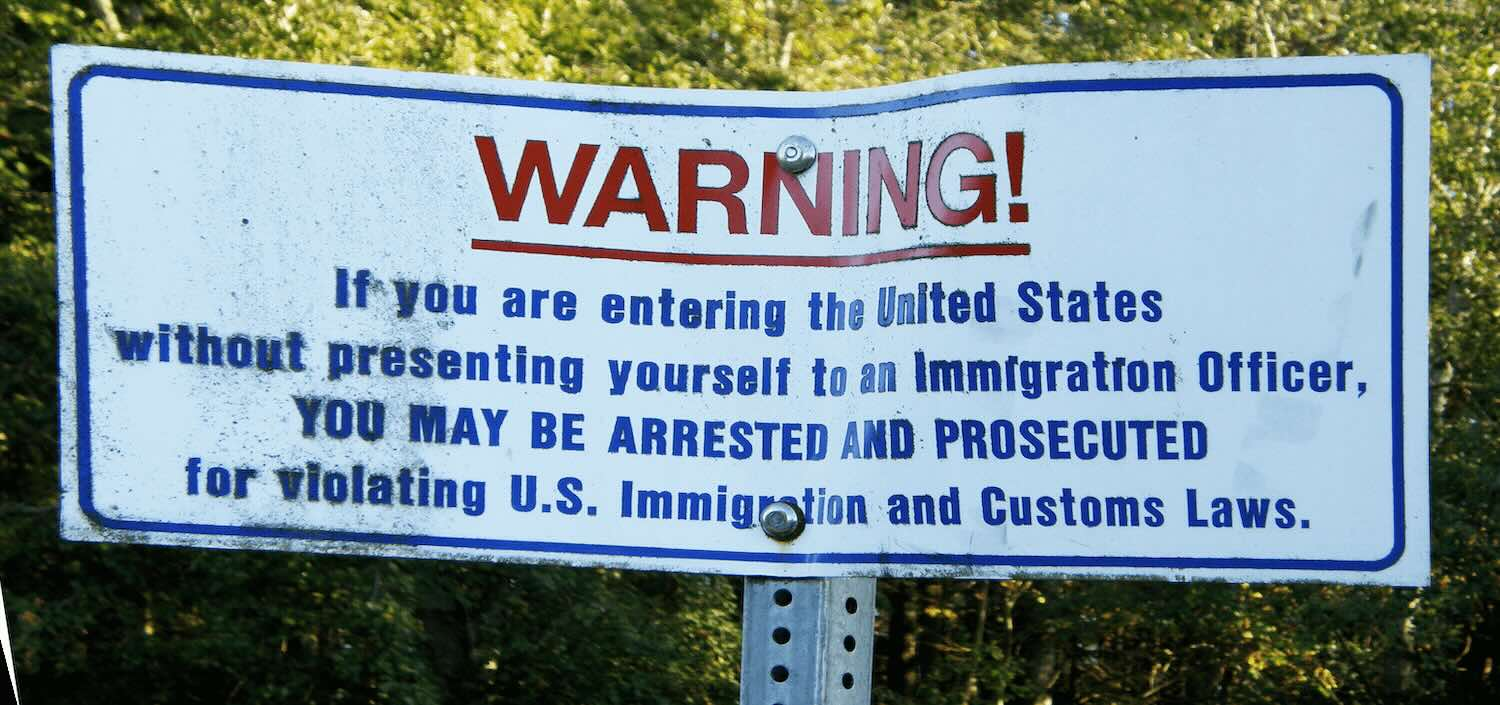
Notice at the international boundary between Canada and the United States in Point Roberts

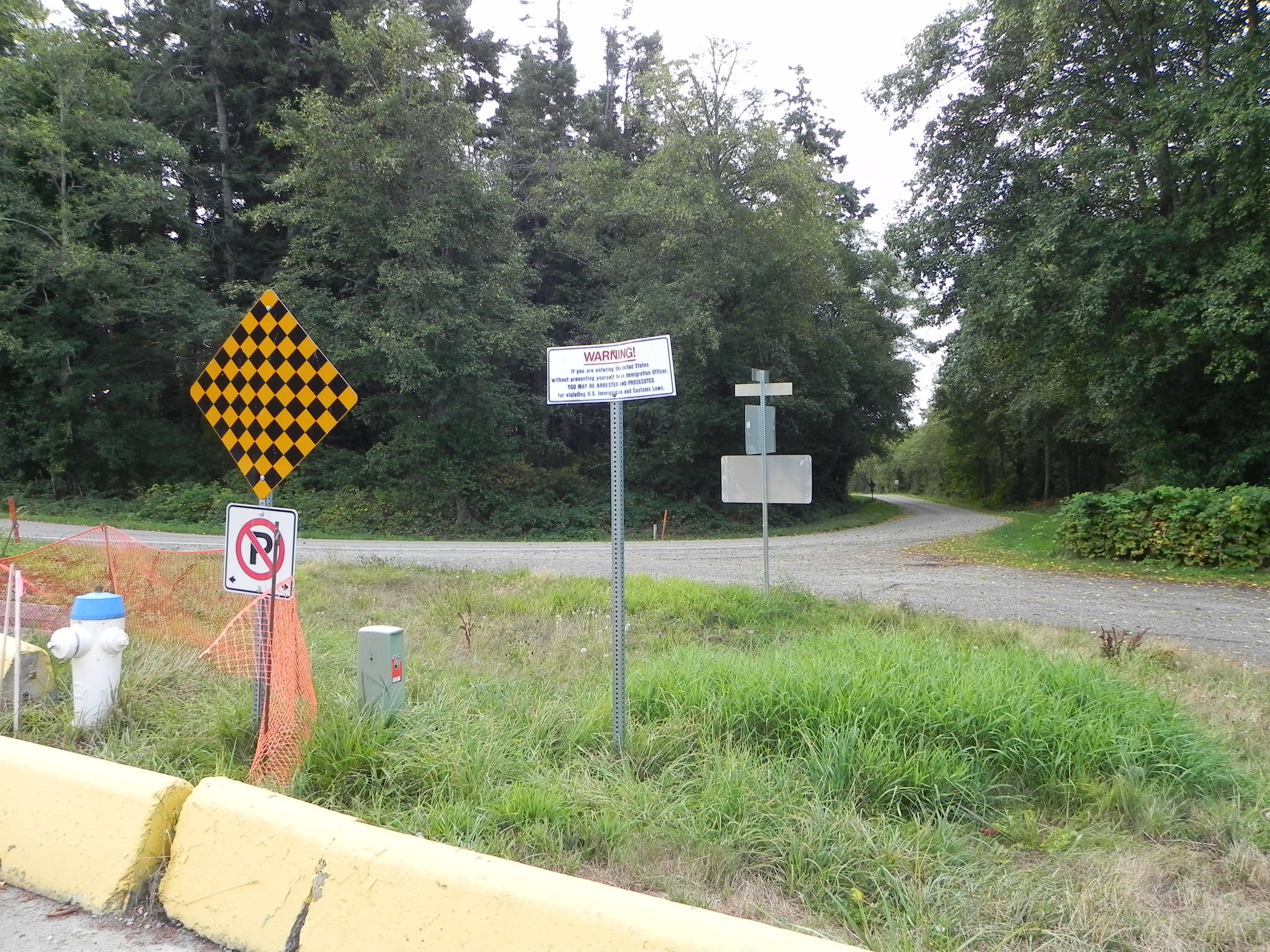
Boundary post in Point Roberts, Washington at the boundary between U.S. and Canada; photo taken at English Bluff Road, Delta facing Marine Drive, Point Roberts

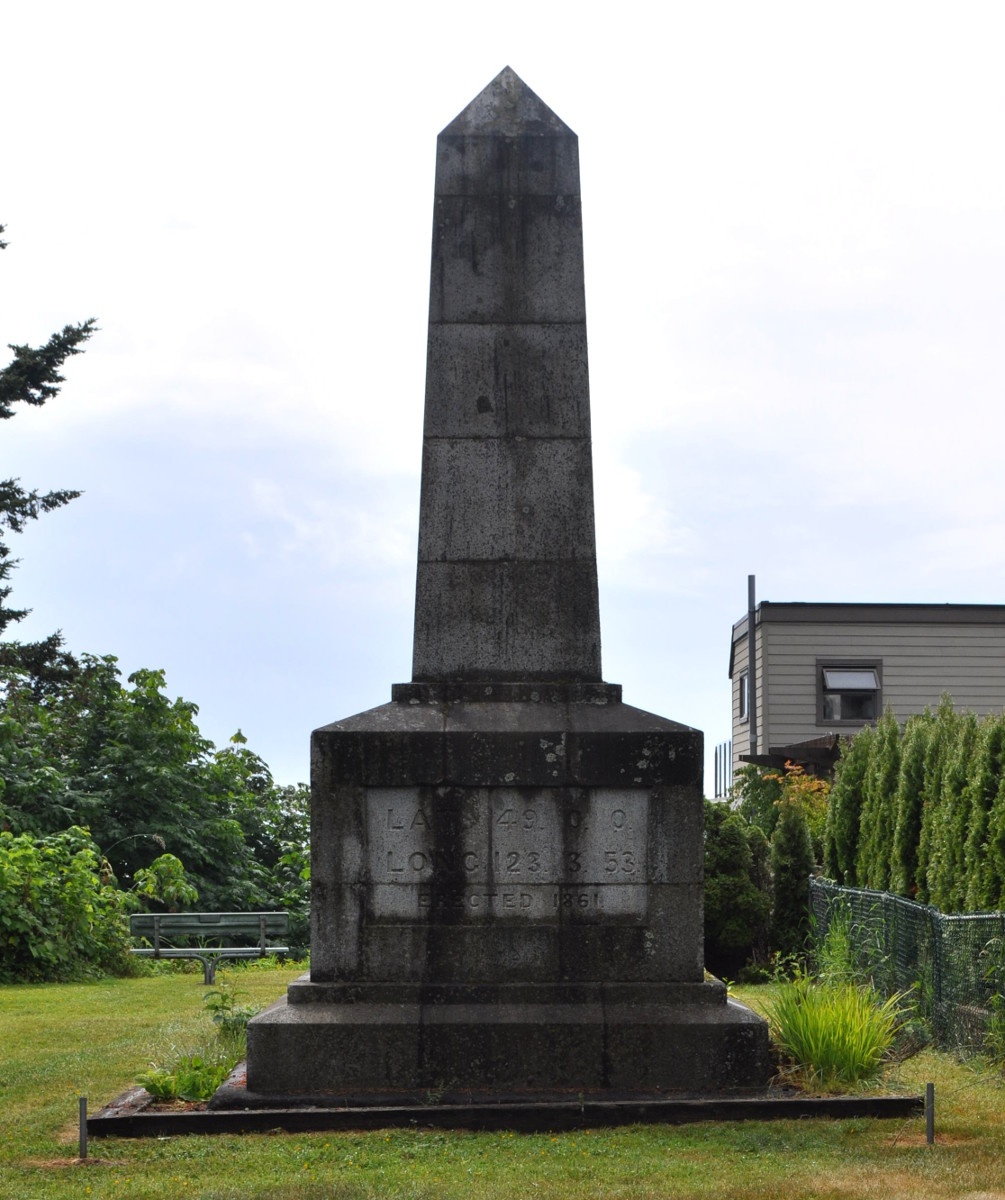
Boundary Marker No.1 on the 49th parallel north on the western shore of Point Roberts, erected in 1861

=== Relationship with Canada ===
During the 1858 Fraser gold rush, prospectors from Victoria, British Columbia, who were attempting to avoid tax collection briefly settled Point Roberts. Their settlement was called Robert's Town and consisted of six wooden buildings, including a store and saloon, but lasted less than a year.

In 1949, there was talk about Point Roberts seceding from the U.S. and joining Canada. A regional development plan for the Lower Mainland presented in 1952 suggested turning Point Roberts into an international park or leasing it for 99 or 999 years. In 1973, a drought that caused the wells to run dry created tensions between Point Roberts's U.S. and Canadian residents. The Americans threatened to cut off the Canadian residents' water supply—and hung up signs saying "Canadians Go Home"—unless the Canadian municipality of Delta agreed to provide water. An agreement signed on August 28, 1987, requires the Point Roberts Water District to purchase raw water on an annual basis from the Greater Vancouver Water District. Delta Fire Department also provides assistance to the Point Roberts volunteer fire department when requested. Until 1988, BC Tel (now Telus Communications) provided telephone service; the sole exchange prefix of 945, officially part of area code 206, could also be dialed through area code 604 during the period of BC Tel ownership.

After the September 11 attacks of 2001, security at border crossings—including Point Roberts—was increased, leading to long delays for residents. The Canadian border was closed to non-essential travel in March 2020 due to the COVID-19 pandemic, which had been worsening in both countries but especially in the United States. In 2020, a study found that Point Roberts had lost 80 percent of its business and hundreds of seasonal residents as a result of the pandemic and border shutdown. The area, described as a "ghost town" by the local chamber of commerce director, had no confirmed cases of COVID-19 as of September 2020. A temporary ferry was set up by the Port of Bellingham in August 2020 to connect Point Roberts to the mainland, initially to Blaine and later Bellingham. The Canadian government waived its mandatory COVID testing requirements for Point Roberts residents in February 2021, following negotiations with Washington state. The border was fully reopened for non-essential travel in August 2021 and the ferry service ceased the same month.

During the COVID-19 pandemic, Point Roberts was acclaimed as the "safest place" for avoiding the coronavirus, due to its isolation from the mainland United States and Canada, and very low case numbers. Because of limited access to the rest of Whatcom County, and border closures into Canada, the case numbers remained very low. The City of Delta installed a chain-link fence at the end of English Bluff Road in 2025 to deter accidental crossings after an elderly man walked into Point Roberts. The fence was poorly received by local residents, and at least one Delta council member demanded its removal.

== Geography ==
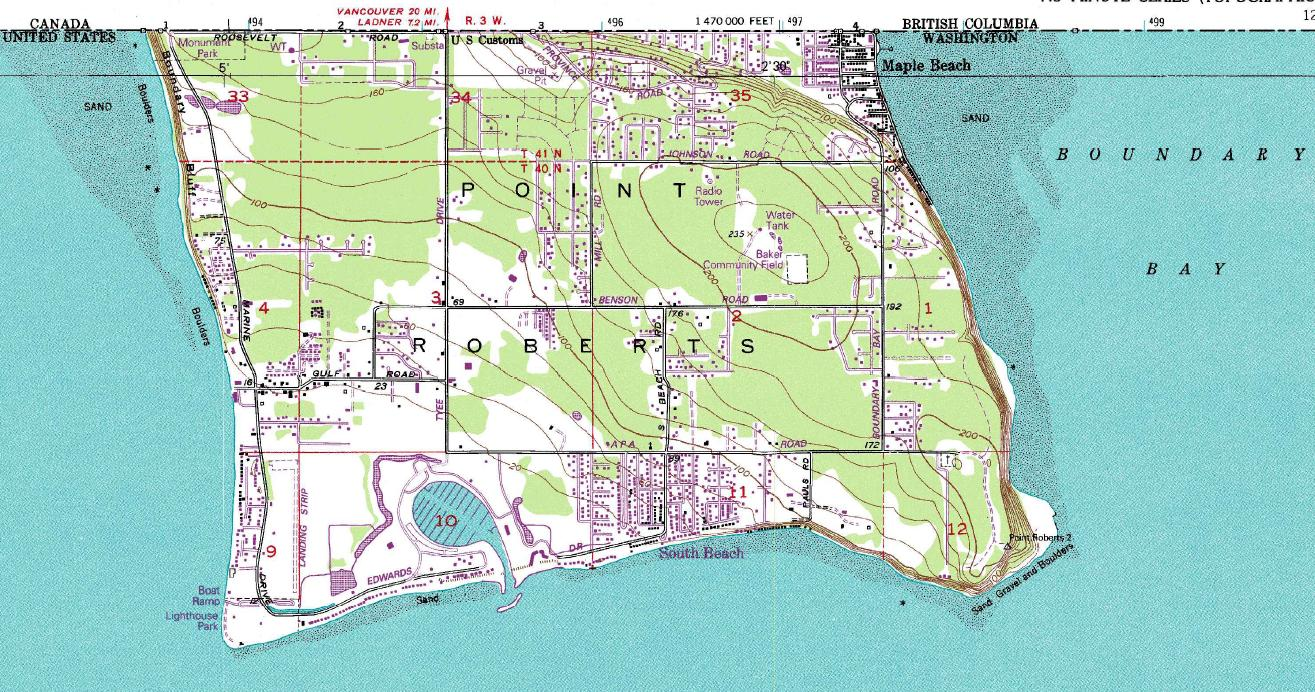
USGS map showing Point Roberts

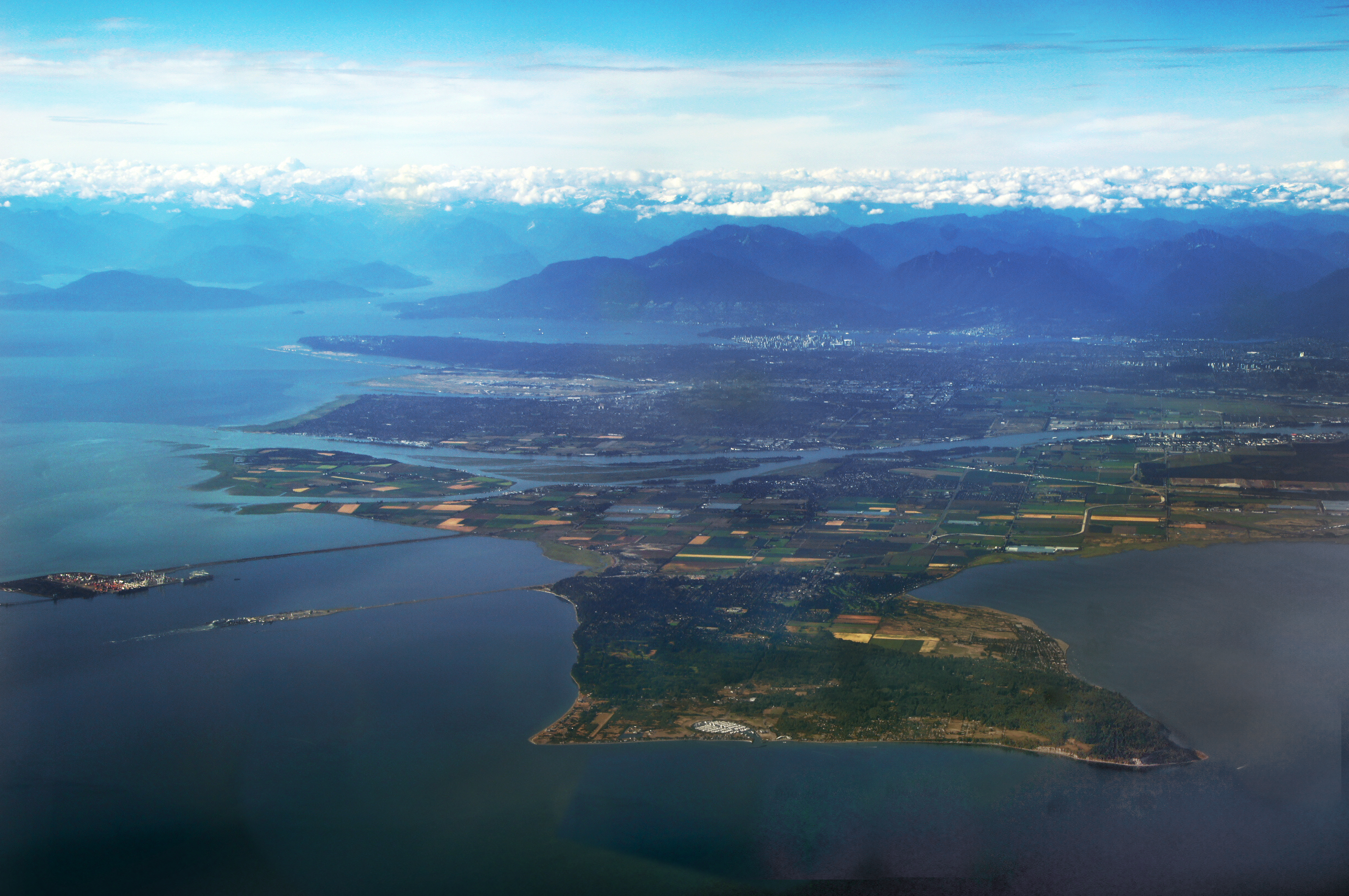
Point Roberts as seen from the south, looking north toward Vancouver, Canada

Point Roberts is a U.S. exclave bordered by Canada and the waters of Boundary Bay. It is 22 miles (35 km) south of Downtown Vancouver, British Columbia. Point Roberts is part of the U.S. because it lies south of the 49th parallel, which constitutes the Canada–US border in that area. Other exclaves of this type include parts of Minnesota, such as the Northwest Angle and Elm Point, Minnesota. Alburgh, Vermont, and nearby Province Point are separated from the rest of the U.S. by Lake Champlain, though Alburgh is reachable by highway bridge from "mainland" Vermont.

Point Roberts borders the municipality of Delta in British Columbia. Boundary Bay lies to the east of Point Roberts and the Strait of Georgia to the south and west. The U.S. portion of the peninsula is about 2 miles (3 km) from north to south and about 3 miles (5 km) from east to west. It has an area of 4.884 square miles (12.65 km^{2}), all land.

=== Geology ===
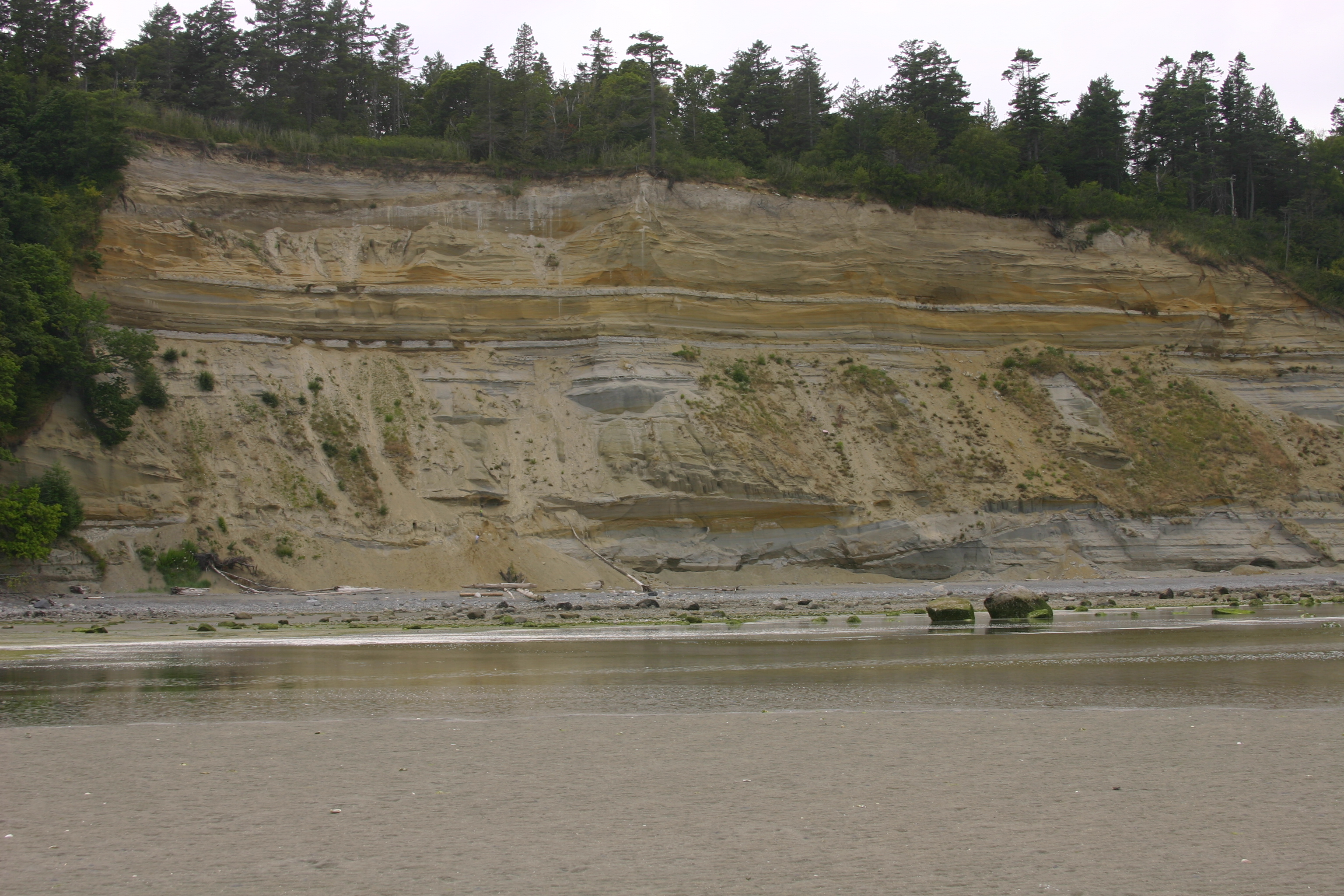
East cliff face at Lily Point

Beneath Point Roberts, the bedrock of the Chuckanut Formation was deposited as an alluvial plain containing layers of sediments consisting of silt, sand, gravel and peat. During the last 60 million years the sediments were compacted and folded by mountain building forces from continental drift to form strata of siltstone, sandstone, conglomerate and coal. During recent geologic history, the Chuckanut formation was overridden by four or more glaciations.

Point Roberts consists of a series of the resulting glacial sediments resting upon the Chuckanut Formation. The lowest glacial sediments (now near sea level) are from Salmon Springs or older glaciations. At the peak of the most recent glaciation, the main ice sheet was in excess of 7,000 feet (2,100 m) thick as it moved southward between Vancouver Island and the Canadian Coast Range and down the Strait of Georgia. A smaller lobe of the continental glacier in excess of 5,000 feet (1,500 m) traveled down the Fraser River flood plains merging with the main ice sheet over the greater Vancouver area and Whatcom and Skagit Counties. The coalesced continental ice sheet traveled south terminating in the vicinity of Chehalis, Washington. Relatively impermeable Vashon glacial lodgment till (estimated to be as much as 40 feet (12 m) thick at the uppermost layer) was plastered over the advance outwash as the weight of the 7,000-foot (2,100 m) thick plus Strait of Georgia ice lobe moved southward over approximately 10,000 years. (Armstrong, et al., 1965) Point Roberts, Tsawwassen, and part of British Columbia extending past English Bluff comprised an island at the close of the Vashon Glaciation, approximately 11,000 years ago.

As the ice sheets melted, the thinner Fraser Lobe began to float while the Strait of Georgia lobe acted as a dam forming a lake under the Fraser Lobe. Sediments settling from the melting, floating ice resulted in the accumulation of 300 feet (91 m) or more of glacial marine drift over much of western Whatcom County. (Easterbrook, 1976; Geologic Map of Western Whatcom County, Washington, USGS, Map I-854-B) This glacial marine drift is generally soft and was not consolidated by the weight of the glacier. A discontinuous, thin mantle of this glacial marine drift above the glacial lodgement till has been identified sporadically across Point Roberts. The uppermost layer of glacial sediments consists of recessional sand, silt, and gravel deposited as the Strait of Georgia ice lobe receded. Since the recession of the glaciers, the Fraser River has deposited deltaic sediments on the north and easterly side of the Point Roberts-Tsawwassen Island, connecting it to the Greater Vancouver mainland (approximately 2,500 years ago, Murray 2008). At some locations, these sediments have been eroded or removed, exposing the lodgement till.

=== Parks and features ===
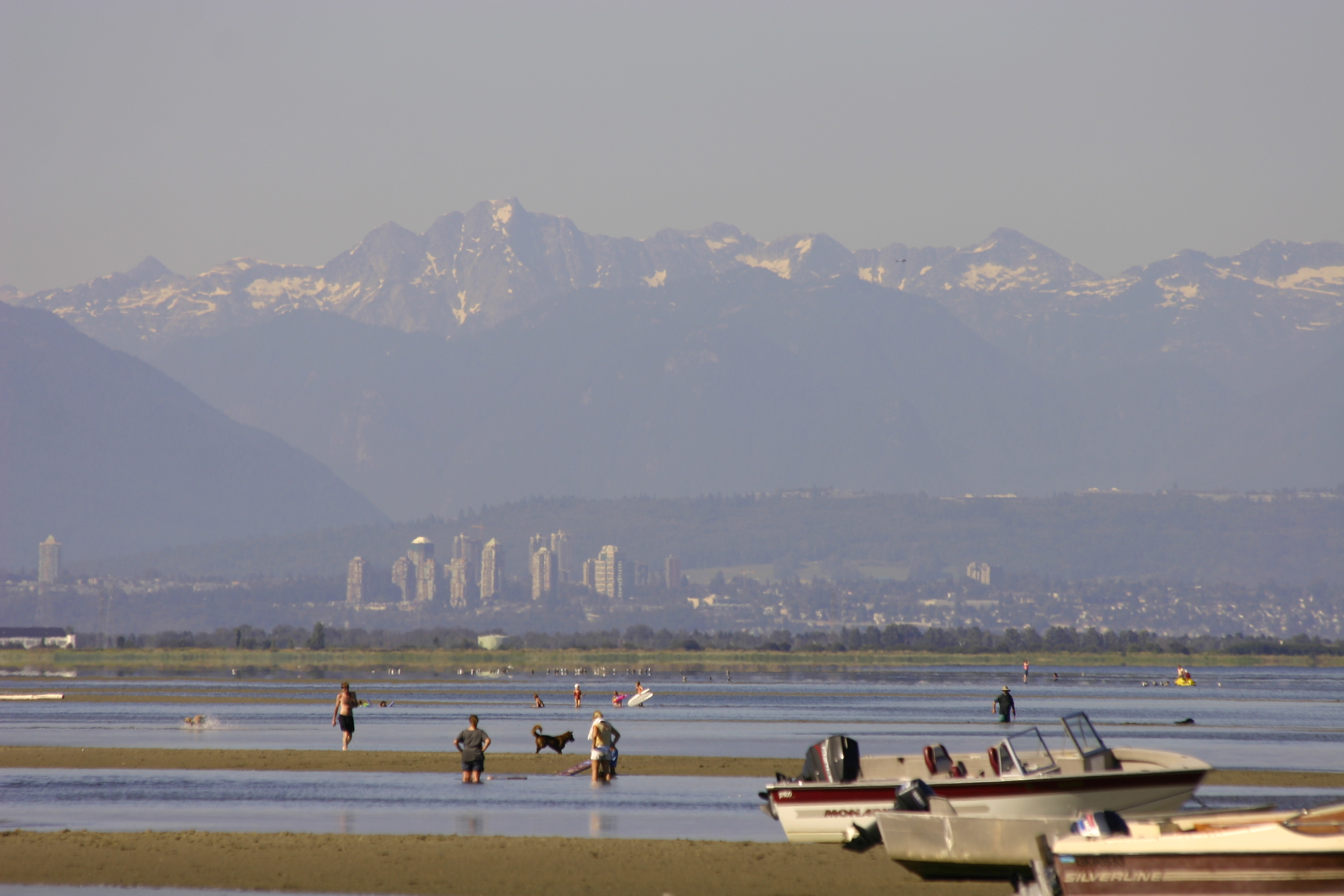
Looking north from Maple Beach

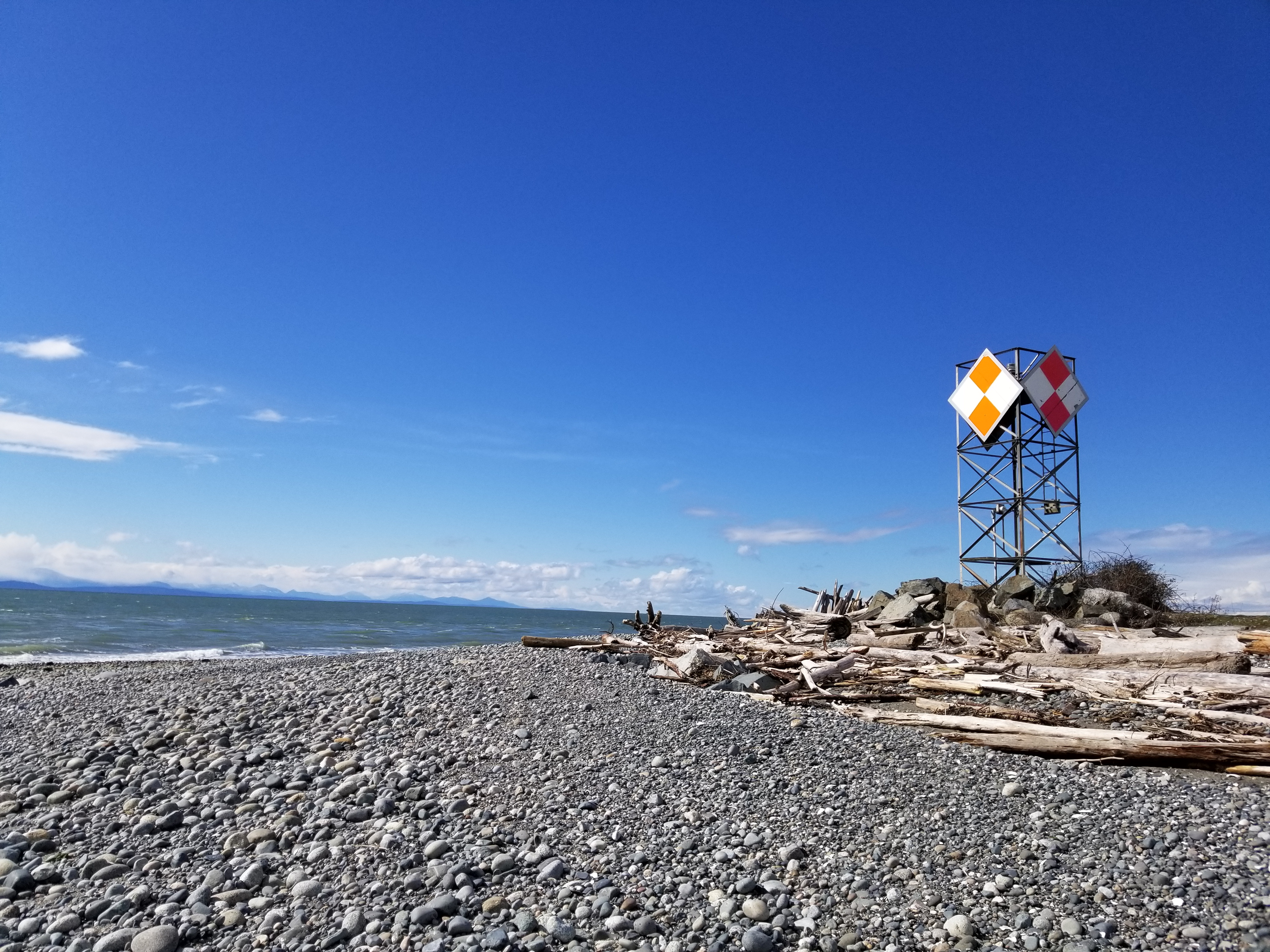
Lighthouse Marine Park

- Maple Beach (NE)
- Monument Park (NW)
- Lighthouse Marine Park (SW)
- Point Roberts Skate Park (Central – recreational open space)
- Lily Point Marine Reserve (SE)
- Cascadia Marine Trail (S and E)

=== Neighborhoods ===
- South Beach Estates (beach rights)
- Bells Grove
- Crystal Waters
- Freeman Beach
- Lily Point
- Maple Beach
- Waters Plat
- Ocean View Estates
- Seabright Farm Cottages
- Cedar Heights

=== Climate ===
Despite its proximity to the 49th parallel north, Point Roberts has an Oceanic climate (Köppen: Cfb); however, winters may be colder for this climatic subtype, as in the rest of the Vancouver–Seattle–Portland axis. Point Roberts lies within a depression created by Vancouver Island, the North Shore Mountains surrounding Vancouver, and the North Cascades (including Mount Baker). This micro-climate provides some of the mildest weather in the Pacific Northwest. With annual precipitation of about 40 inches (1,000 mm), Point Roberts enjoys more sunny days and a milder climate than its neighbors. While its location near the 49th parallel north suggests a harsh winter, snow averages and low January temperatures are milder than the American average: 8.4 inches (210 mm) in vs 25.8 inches (660 mm) and 35.8 °F (2.1 °C) vs 22.6 °F (−5.2 °C), respectively. Although the amount of rainfall is less than the regional average, it is better-distributed through the year, with 146 days of precipitation. The comfort index is high.

Climate data for Point Roberts, Washington
Month	Jan	Feb	Mar	Apr	May	Jun	Jul	Aug	Sep	Oct	Nov	Dec	Year
Record high °F (°C)	61 (16)	68 (20)	72 (22)	80 (27)	85 (29)	92 (33)	95 (35)	92 (33)	86 (30)	78 (26)	65 (18)	62 (17)	95 (35)
Mean daily maximum °F (°C)	45.3 (7.4)	48.3 (9.1)	52.4 (11.3)	57.3 (14.1)	63.0 (17.2)	67.6 (19.8)	71.6 (22.0)	71.7 (22.1)	66.8 (19.3)	57.7 (14.3)	49.5 (9.7)	44.2 (6.8)	58.0 (14.4)
Mean daily minimum °F (°C)	34.5 (1.4)	35.0 (1.7)	38.0 (3.3)	41.4 (5.2)	46.3 (7.9)	50.8 (10.4)	53.6 (12.0)	53.4 (11.9)	49.0 (9.4)	43.4 (6.3)	38.2 (3.4)	33.7 (0.9)	43.1 (6.2)
Record low °F (°C)	−1 (−18)	−1 (−18)	11 (−12)	22 (−6)	26 (−3)	35 (2)	37 (3)	37 (3)	28 (−2)	19 (−7)	6 (−14)	−1 (−18)	−1 (−18)
Average precipitation inches (mm)	4.98 (126)	3.40 (86)	3.41 (87)	2.43 (62)	2.02 (51)	1.72 (44)	1.22 (31)	1.39 (35)	1.85 (47)	3.65 (93)	6.01 (153)	5.90 (150)	37.98 (965)
Average snowfall inches (cm)	2.5 (6.4)	1.5 (3.8)	0.6 (1.5)	0 (0)	0 (0)	0 (0)	0 (0)	0 (0)	0 (0)	0.1 (0.25)	0.7 (1.8)	3.0 (7.6)	8.4 (21)
Source 1:
Source 2:

== Demographics ==
Historical population
Census	Pop.	Note	%±
2010	1,314		—
2020	1,191		−9.4%
U.S. Decennial Census; 2000 2010

Point Roberts first appeared as a census designated place in the 2010 U.S. census.

=== Racial and ethnic composition ===
Point Roberts CDP, Washington – Racial and ethnic composition Note: the US Census treats Hispanic/Latino as an ethnic category. This table excludes Latinos from the racial categories and assigns them to a separate category. Hispanics/Latinos may be of any race.
Race / Ethnicity (NH = Non-Hispanic)	Pop 2010	Pop 2020	% 2010	% 2020
White alone (NH)	1,186	1,013	90.26%	85.05%
Black or African American alone (NH)	9	3	0.68%	0.25%
Native American or Alaska Native alone (NH)	11	3	0.84%	0.25%
Asian alone (NH)	58	51	4.41%	4.28%
Native Hawaiian or Pacific Islander alone (NH)	0	4	0.00%	0.34%
Other race alone (NH)	1	7	0.08%	0.59%
Mixed race or Multiracial (NH)	17	53	1.29%	4.45%
Hispanic or Latino (any race)	32	57	2.44%	4.79%
Total	1,314	1,191	100.00%	100.00%

=== 2010 census ===
As of the 2010 United States census, there were 1,314 people, 678 households, and 372 families residing in the Point Roberts ZCTA (ZIP Code Tabulation Area). There were 2,068 housing units, only 678 (33%) of which were occupied. The racial makeup of the ZCTA was 91.9% White, 0.8% African American, 0.8% Native American, 4.5% Asian, 0.3% from other races, and 1.7% from two or more races. Hispanics or Latinos of any race were 2.4% of the population.

The age distribution was 16.2% under 20, 3.0% from 20 to 24, 16.2% from 25 to 44, 40.7% from 45 to 64, and 23.9% who were 65 or older. The median age was 52.7 years.

The median income for a household in the ZCTA was US$58,672; the median income for a family was $75,724; and the per capita income was $39,696.

During the summer the area's population swells to about 4,500; most of the visitors are vacationing Canadians.

Point Roberts' population includes descendants of Icelandic immigrants, who first settled there in the 1890s.

== Economy ==
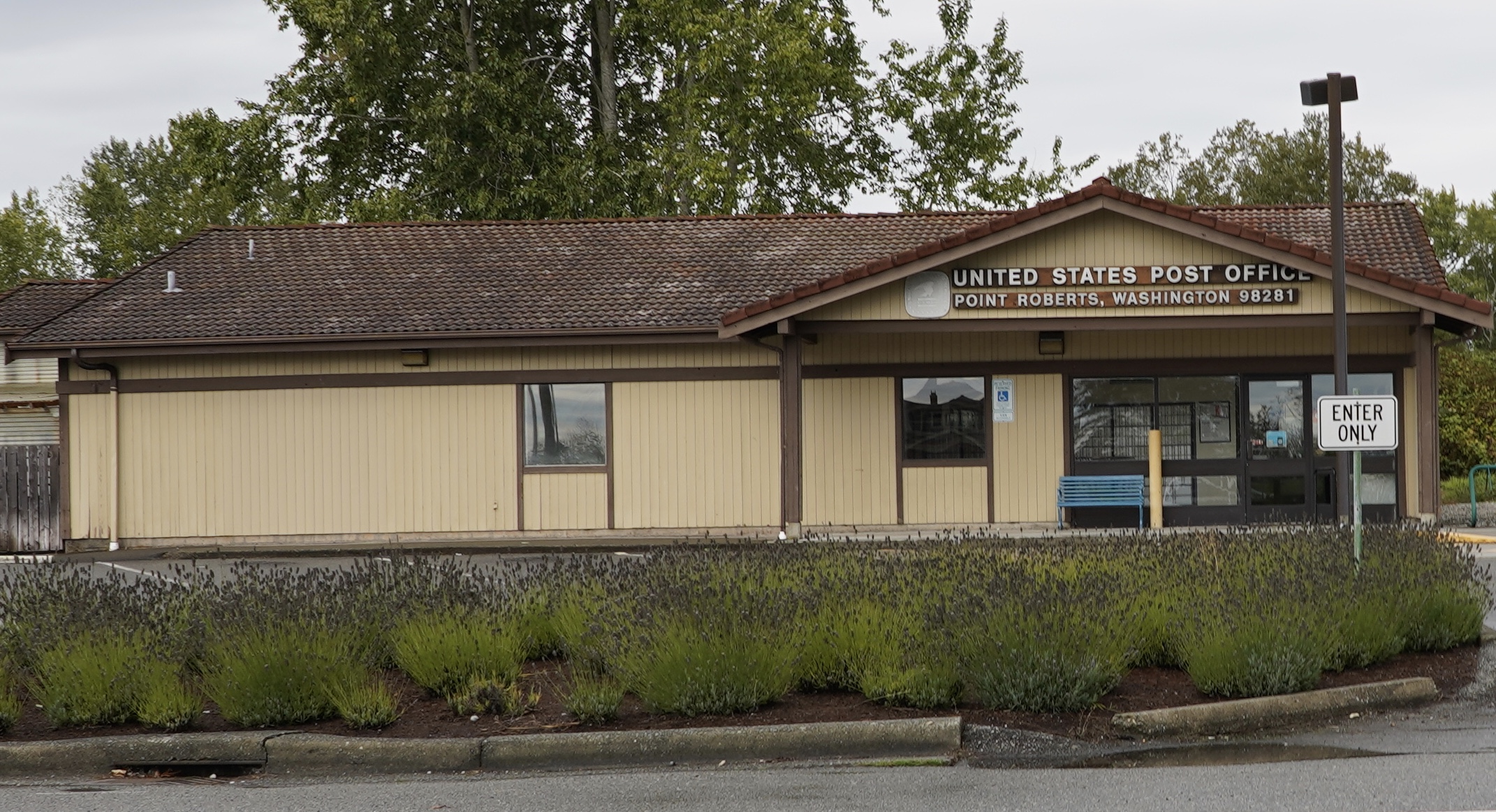
Point Roberts Post Office

Many of the area's businesses serve weekend and recreational visitors from Greater Vancouver. Canadians visit for cheaper American gasoline, alcohol, and food when the Canadian dollar is strong; Americans from Point Roberts seek goods which are cheaper in Canada. Many Canadians visited its bars and nightclubs on Sundays, until Sunday drinking was legalized in British Columbia in 1986. The local post office and several private companies rent many post office boxes to individuals and businesses from the Greater Vancouver area, who find it a convenient and fast way to receive mail and parcels from the United States without paying for cross-border shipping costs, or as a delivery point for online purchases when American sellers do not ship outside the United States. Forty times more Canadians have mailboxes in Point Roberts than the number of residents. The U.S. Consulate General in Vancouver also used the Point Roberts post office, but it has since changed to using one in Blaine, Washington, on the contiguous border.

Because entry to Point Roberts from the rest of the U.S. requires two international border crossings, it has sometimes been described as "the best gated community in the U.S." Residents enjoy a low crime rate, with a high local security presence. Popular folklore describes the town as a popular resettlement site for the US Federal Witness Protection Program, assisting informants who testify against criminals to relocate under new identities for their protection.

While there is one doctor's clinic, there is no hospital, dentist, pharmacist or veterinarian. Point Roberts residents usually seek medical care in Bellingham, Washington, although Vancouver is closer, because American health insurers will not pay for treatment from Canadian providers.

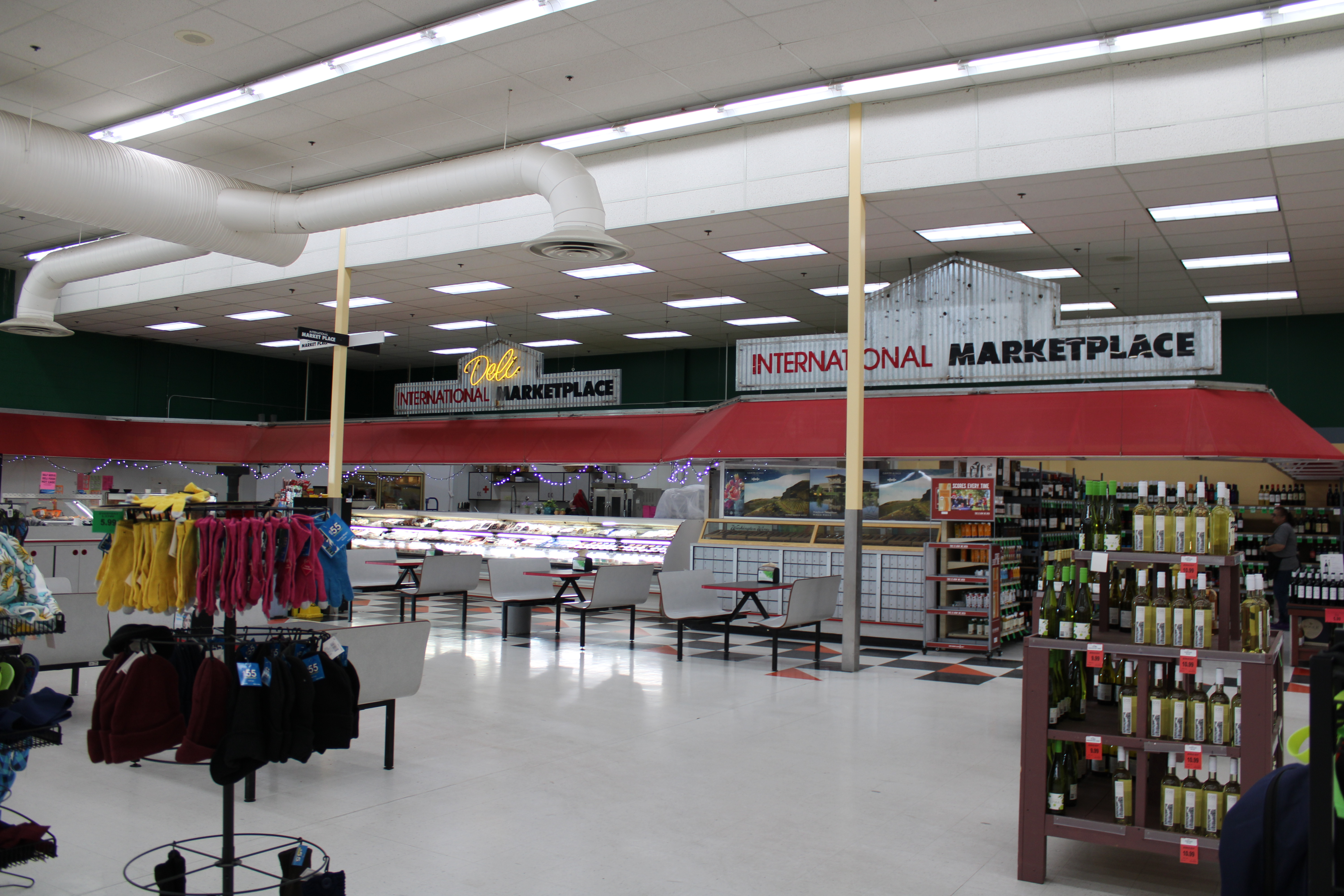
Inside Point Roberts International Marketplace

Point Roberts has a single grocery store, Point Roberts International Marketplace, which threatened to close in July 2021 due to the prolonged travel restrictions due to the COVID-19 pandemic. An emergency grant of US$100,000 from the state government was approved in late June to prevent its closure.

The Point Roberts Golf & Country Club is one of the area's key recreational facilities and contributes to the local cross-border visitor economy. The course, formerly operating as Bald Eagle Golf Club, underwent a prolonged closure following the COVID-19 border shutdown, resulting in operational disruptions before being prepared for reopening under new ownership and management in 2025. The course depends heavily on attracting customers from Vancouver, who account for the vast majority of rounds played, sustaining revenue in local economy.

After US president Donald Trump in 2025 introduced a 25% tariff on Canadian goods and was suggesting that Canada should become a US state, Canadians who objected boycotted US goods; this led to a 30% drop in Canadian visitors to Point Roberts, causing some businesses to close and others to relocate to Canada, a situation said to be worse than during the pandemic. Local people were concerned that Point Roberts as they know it could cease to exist if the government did not help.

== Education ==
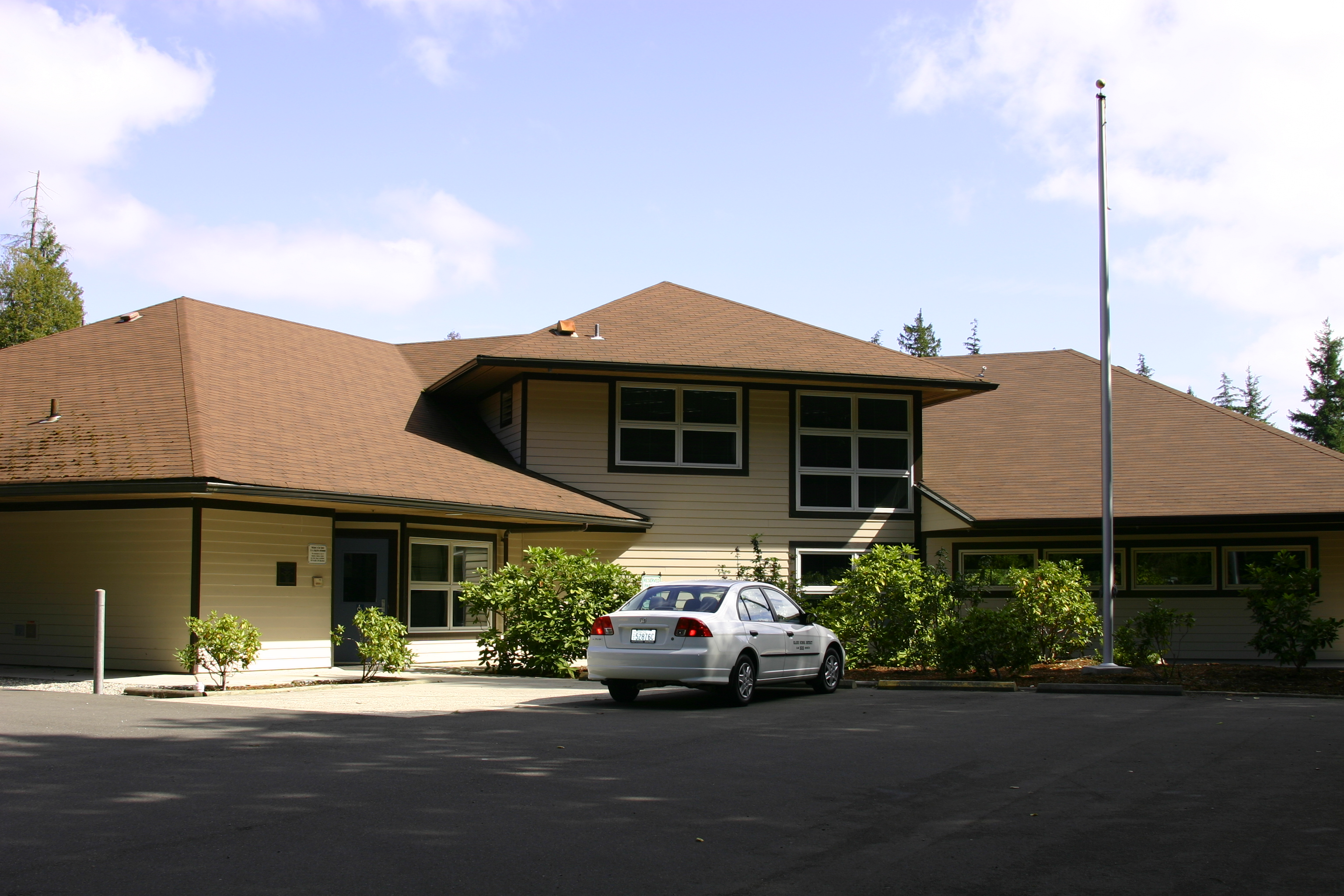
Point Roberts Primary School

The community is served by the Blaine School District. Point Roberts Primary School, the sole school in the exclave, is part of the Blaine School District and provides teaching for kindergarten as well as first through third grades. It is classified as a remote and necessary school by the state government and is the smallest school in Whatcom County, with approximately 15 students and one full-time teacher. The three-room schoolhouse opened in 1993 and began offering third grade lessons in 1999. From 4th grade onward, American children must take a 40-minute ride through British Columbia, crossing back into the United States at Blaine, Washington. Students therefore cross the US–Canada border four times, two on the trip to Blaine and two on the trip back. Canadian children can attend school in Delta, British Columbia.

== Infrastructure ==
=== Transportation ===
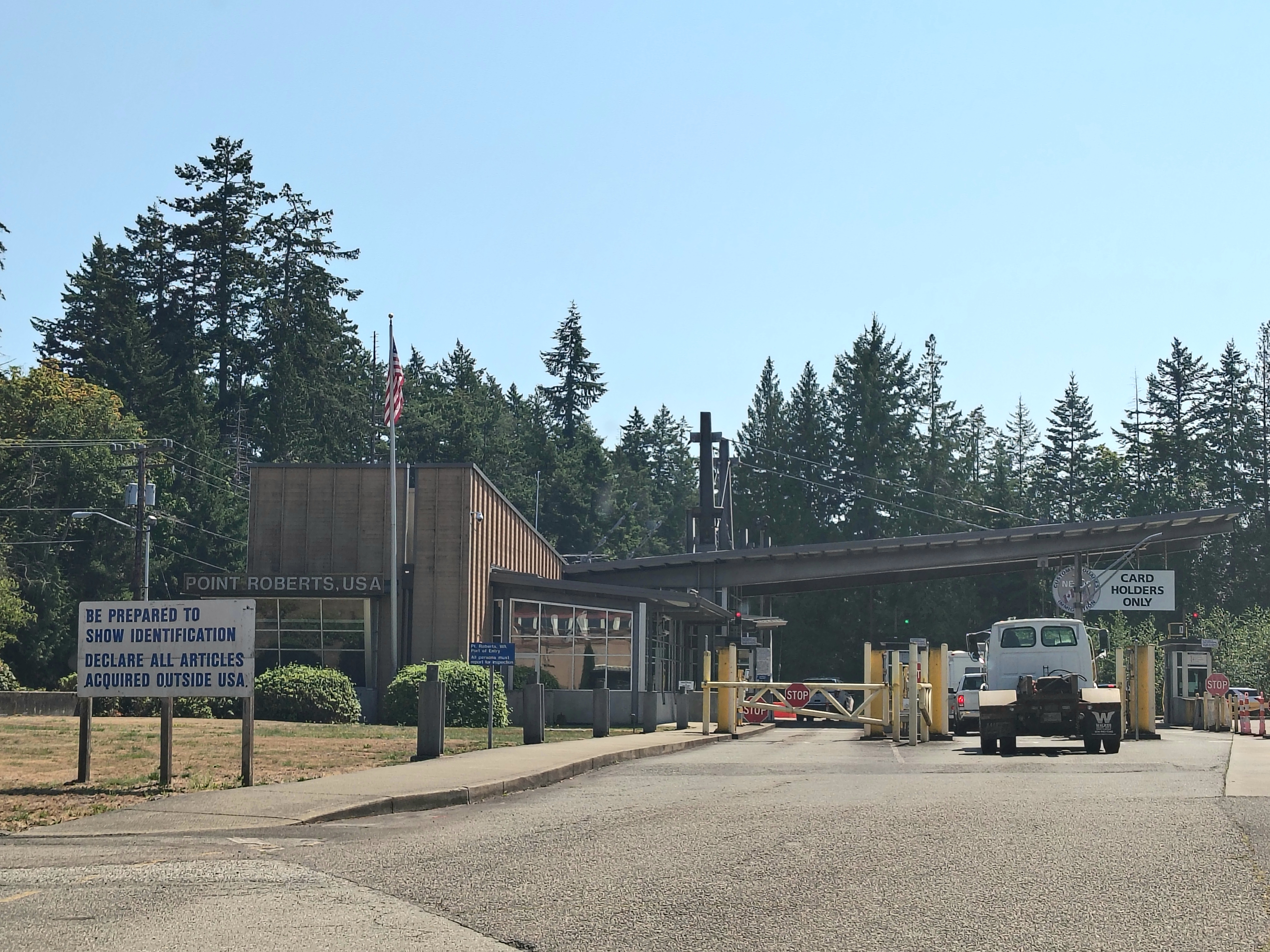
The US point of entry into Point Roberts

The only authorized land access to Canada is through the Point Roberts–Boundary Bay Border Crossing, the westernmost access point in the contiguous United States. It connects Tyee Drive in Point Roberts to 56 Street in Delta, British Columbia; the street continues north through Tsawwassen to British Columbia Highway 17, which provides access to other areas of Metro Vancouver. Point Roberts also has a small airport (Point Roberts Airpark) and a large marina (Point Roberts Marina Resort) for air and water access; these two point facilities allow direct access to the rest of Washington state without the need to enter Canada.

A temporary passenger ferry service from Point Roberts to Blaine operated by the Port of Bellingham and the Whatcom Transportation Authority entered service in August 2020 amid the COVID-19 pandemic, which had caused the Canadian border to be closed to non-essential travel for several months. The ferry used two vessels leased from San Juan Cruises and was fare-free. It was initially run once per week, but the frequency was increased to twice a week and the ferry was diverted to serve the Bellingham Cruise Terminal due to high demand. Ferry service ended in August 2021 as the border was reopening to nonessential travel. The Whatcom Transportation Authority also operates the "Raven", a passenger van between Point Roberts and Bellingham that began service in 2024.

Roosevelt Road follows the US side of the border across the peninsula. To the west, it ends at a small park, Monument Park built around Monument 1, the westernmost point of the 49th parallel border.

=== Telecommunications ===
Until 1988, Point Roberts telephone numbers were in British Columbia's area code 604 and served by BCTel, the local telephone company for most of British Columbia. It was served by the 945 exchange which was officially in area code 206, the area code for most of western Washington, but protected in 604, resulting in the oddity of calls from the Vancouver, British Columbia metro area being local calls while calls from Washington and the rest of the United States were billed as international calls. In 1988, Point Roberts service was severed from BC Tel, and the protection of the 604-945 prefix ended, at the expense of losing the ability to make local calls to any other exchange in either country. Along with the rest of Whatcom County, Point Roberts moved to area code 360 in 1995. The local regular-service telecom provider is Whidbey Telecom.

Although Point Roberts is nominally part of the Seattle television market, the only over-the-air stations available in the town come from the Metro Vancouver region and Bellingham, Washington. Cable television in Point Roberts was provided by Delta Cable, a subsidiary of Canadian cable company EastLink. Delta Cable pulled out of Point Roberts with short notice in August 2019.

Whidbey Telecom is the broadband Internet provider to residents of Point Roberts. In 2019, Whidbey Telecom began construction to provide fiber-optic Internet to Point Roberts.

Mobile telephone service is provided by a variety of companies, both American and Canadian.

== Notable people ==
Current

- Glen Hanlon, former National Hockey League goaltender and former ice hockey coach
- Nick Kiniski, former professional wrestler

Past

- Pavel Bure, former National Hockey League forward
- Ross Douglas, songwriter, musician and actor
- Roger Fisher and Nancy Wilson, of rock band Heart
- Margaret Laurence, Canadian novelist and short story writer
- Kekuta Manneh, Gambian-born soccer player, formerly of Vancouver Whitecaps FC
- Alexander Mogilny, former National Hockey League forward
- Dave Nonis, National Hockey League Toronto Maple Leafs
- Bob Robertson, longtime Northwest sportscaster
- Katee Sackhoff, actress; lived in Point Roberts during filming the TV series Battlestar Galactica
- John Tortorella, former National Hockey League head coach

== See also ==
- Border irregularities of the United States
- Oregon boundary dispute
- Tsawwassen, British Columbia
- Río Rico, Tamaulipas, a city that was once an exclave of the United States, now ceded to Mexico
- Northwest Angle, another US pene-exclave in Canada
