= Whidbey Telecom =

Telecommunications company based in Island County, Washington (USA)

- Type: Private & Subsidiary of Abound Ventures
- Industry: Telecommunications
- Founded: 1908
- Founder: Jacob Anthes
- Headquarters: Langley, Washington, United States
- Key people: Donna Hilty (CEO); Marion Henny (Owner); Julia Henny (Owner); George Henny (Owner)
- Services: Telephony; Internet; Security
- ASN: 3853
- Website: whidbeytel.com

Whidbey Telecom (legally Whidbey Telephone Company and often called Whidbey Tel) is a private, independent telecommunications company operating on Whidbey Island in Washington State, the community of Point Roberts, Washington, and its affiliate Hat Island Telephone Company operates on Hat (Gedney) Island. Whidbey Telecom has been locally owned and operated since it started business in 1908.

== History ==
Whidbey Telephone was founded in 1908 by local business owners and farmers in Langley, Washington, spearheaded by Jacob Anthes. They had a desire to provide locally owned telephone service to the Whidbey Island community. By 1912, all residents of South Whidbey had access to the Whidbey Telephone system. The end of World War II saw an influx of new residents to Whidbey Island, putting a significant burden on the small phone company.

The 1950s saw a lot of investment go into the infrastructure, but the burdens of growth along with limited coverage caused it to lose money. In 1953 local businessman David C. Henny purchased a controlling interest in Whidbey Telephone Company. He spearheaded a restructuring of the company that allowed it to become profitable, while completing the infrastructure upgrades to allow for higher reliability, and future growth. Over the course of the next several years, Henny purchased all outstanding shares of the company, and became the sole owner. His family is still responsible for the company today.

Whidbey Island was subject to frequent winter storms, causing the aerial phone lines to be severed frequently, causing significant numbers of customers to lose service. With the number of trees in the community and a desire to increase reliability and reduce maintenance costs due to windstorms and snow, the company began to bury its infrastructure, and by 1961, 100% of service lines were underground, a first for a local telephone company. Since then there has not been widespread service disruption due to damaged to company-owned infrastructure.

Former Co-CEO George Henny saw the commercialization of the Internet as an opportunity to keep the company relevant as technology advanced. This resulted in Whidbey Telephone becoming the first local phone company (west of the Rocky Mountains) to provide independent Internet access, Whidbey.NET to its customers in 1994. Building on that success, the changes in technology, and massive upgrades of infrastructure that was performed in the 1990s, and 100% ownership of the lines, Whidbey.NET began to offer DSL service to its customers in the year 2000. Initially only available in the communities that were able to support the large DSLAM facilities, by 2022, 100% of the service area was capable of receiving DSL service, in all three regions. With the regulatory changes in the DSL space, and the ability to provide services in other service areas, Whidbey.NET also provided services in Verizon territory on Whidbey Island, Camano Island, and parts of Skagit and Snohomish County. This service was discontinued in the mid-2010s due to changes in technology and Verizon's sale of assets in the area to Frontier Communications.

== Internet services ==
Internet services on Whidbey Island began in 1994. Whidbey Telephone began Whidbey Internet Services (WIS) to cover the telephone company's service area. At the same time, another company, Whidbey Connections, Inc. (WCI), was founded to serve customers of GTE on the north end of the island. WIS soon expanded to cover people on the north end of the Island, and WCI later expanded to also serve people on the south end of Whidbey Island. WCI's Internet domain was 'whidbey.net', whereas WIS's was 'whidbey.com'. Initial available Internet speeds were 14.4 kbit/s and later 28.8 kbit/s, as demand grew. 33.6 and 56K services were added as those technologies were released. However, Whidbey.NET never supported .V92's ability to pause Internet for phone calls. Dial-up services continued until 2019, having been retired on South Whidbey and Point Roberts in 2010.

In 1995, Whidbey Telephone Company acquired the assets of Whidbey Connections, Inc., and integrated into Whidbey Internet Service to form WhidbeyNET. As a result of the merger, some customers of Whidbey.NET on the south end of Whidbey continue to have '.net' addresses whereas most south end customers have '.com'. Until 2001, WhidbeyNET maintained two different customer databases on their servers, leading some customers to have different passwords, and even different usernames depending on how and where they connected to the ISP. Usernames were fully integrated to email addresses for email and dial-up customers in 2012.

Whidbey.NET began to offer DSL services to some customers (within one mile of local exchange centers) in 2000. By 2002, all Whidbey Telephone customers were capable of receiving Whidbey.NET DSL on south Whidbey Island and in Point Roberts. In 2005, the newly rebranded Whidbey Telecom Internet and Broadband began offering 5.5 Mbit/s DSL, and set their other speeds at 512 kbit/s, and 2.5 Mbit/s. However, Whidbey Telecom does not offer DSL services in Verizon territory on Whidbey Island, but did provide dial-up services in those areas until 2019. Dial-up services are no longer offered by Whidbey Telecom.

In the spring of 2009, Whidbey Telecom began upgrading customers, free of charge, from ADSL to ADSL2+ services. This included speed upgrades to 18 Mbit/s, 12 Mbit/s, and 6 Mbit/s. A new 30 Mbit/s bonded ADSL2+ service was also made available at that time. Additionally, existing dial-up customers were offered a discounted 3 Mbit/s service, in advance of Whidbey Telecom's phasing out their dial-up service on South Whidbey and in Point Roberts which was completed by Summer 2010. With the addition of Television services, even faster Internet connections have become available, utilizing VDSL2+ technologies up to 50 Mbit/s.

The year 2023 saw major changes to DSL services, as new FCC guidelines caused work to be done to upgrade services to a minimum of 25 Mbit/s services where practical. 25 Mbit/s down, and 3 Mbit/s up is the new minimum service advertised, with speeds of 50/20 still available in VDSL Service areas, not currently covered by Fiber.

In 2016 Whidbey Telecom announced it would be installing fiber optic cables to homes and businesses in its service area. The BiG GiG Fiber Network launched later that year in Langley, making Whidbey Telecom the only internet provider on Whidbey Island to provide synchronous upload and download speeds of up to 1000 Mbit/s for both residential and business subscribers. Initially The Big Gig only covered the larger communities on Whidbey, but was expanded to cover the commercial core of Pt. Roberts and smaller neighborhoods within their service area. The ultimate goal is to move everyone to fiber services as quickly as possible, owing to the lower operating costs, faster speeds, and future upgrade paths. Customers who signed up during the initial inquiries in 2015/2016, and whose accounts are in good standing will get the 1000 Mbit/s service for $70/mo, even if they are unable to be installed until many years later. In 2024, multi-gig service, up to 5Gbps was offered for fiber customers.

With changes WiFi technology moving much faster than the actual service, the decision was made to separate Internet and WiFi services offered. This culminated in the discontinuation of WiFi as part of the Internet service in 2017, and the inability to replace modems with ones with integrated WiFi in 2019. Most of this was owing to hardware costs, as integrated modem/router and ONT/routers were significantly more expensive than non-WiFi capable devices; but also to ensure modern security standards and performance were provided. Many of the latest combination devices from as late as 2019, only supported WiFi 4/Wireless N at 2.4 GHz. Additionally, support was very limited with the combination devices due to age and compatibility with newer consumer hardware. To continue to provide a managed WiFi service that customers had relied upon, HOP was developed utilizing WiFi MESH devices from Airsonics, Inc., to replace the wireless functionality of the modems, while also bringing modern WiFi 5 and WiFi 6 services to customers, the ability to MESH units together to better cover homes of various sizes and configurations, and still allow for a hands-off management of WiFi in the home, which was a request of customers. In addition to the WiFi component, HOP also includes Wireguard, a line insurance, that will cover copper and fiber wiring issues within the home, at no additional charge, from the point at which the service is initiated. Allowing the large number of fixed income residents to maintain their services with the peace of mind that they won't have a surprise bill due to a storm frying their lines, or children disconnecting critical items.

Free WiFi Hotspots are also available throughout the community, at public and private buildings, community parks, the Fairgrounds, the company offices, and the Ferry queue (but not on the dock proper). All are free to use for anyone needing access, but with no guarantee of connectivity due to various environmental factors. Whidbey Telecom also provided the first "Ferry Cams" for commuters, which prompted WSDOT to do the same at most of their other facilities, so that ferry users were fully aware of the wait times and traffic conditions.

As part of the 2022 US Infrastructure Bill, Whidbey Telecom received "Middle Mile" grant money, and additional grants to expand its fiber infrastructure beyond its northern service limits. 2024 saw the initial infrastructure installation, with additional work progressing through 2025.

Beginning in the fall of 2005, all services starting being available to those living between the Greenbank Farm and Houston Rd., along the SR 525 right-of-way, including the neighborhoods attached to SR 525. Infrastructure to serve the neighborhoods adjacent to North Bluff Rd. are still in progress, as is the continued expansion of the service area to the north.

== Television ==
It was announced in 2011, that Whidbey Telecom would offer television to customers at competitive rates to those offered by Comcast. The service utilized Microsoft Mediaroom IPTV technology to deliver television over the DSL service. The new WhidbeyTV service was launched in the summer of 2013 quickly became a significant player in the community, with competitive pricing, local support services, and its own channel, called "WhidbeyTV", producing original shows and sharing local content. The service is cost competitive with the other terrestrial options, and continued to expand offerings and service areas until 2018.

In late 2018, Whidbey Telecom announced it was shifting its TV strategy from providing linear TV to partnering with Dish. This shift was due to the dramatic rise in content costs and a fundamental change in the viewing habits of society from linear to streaming entertainment. While it was a difficult decision by the company it enabled Whidbey Telecom to focus on strengthening its investment in its local fiber optic network to its customers.

In 2025, the partnership with Dish ended, and instead the company focusses on assisting customers in selecting streaming services, and providing help navigating the complexities of linear TV streaming service options.

== Security and alarms ==
In the early 2000s, Whidbey Telecom began its own alarm installation and monitoring company, branded as "American Alarms", later rebranded "Whidbey Telecom Security & Alarms". The company initially utilized it operators, later its tech support staff for alarm monitoring and dispatch. Beginning in 2024, those operations have been outsourced to a company in Seattle. Whidbey Telecom provides Security and Alarms services to residents of Island, Skagit, Snohomish, and Whatcom counties, with a focus on Whidbey Island proper. The Alarms division monitors residential, commercial, and government installations for burglary, duress, medical, and fire alarms, with new installations utilizing cellular and IP based connectivity.

Closed circuit video services are also installed and used by businesses and residents alike, especially snowbirds, to ensure security of property, and provide evidence in cases of a holdup or robbery.

== Rebranding ==
In September 2004, Whidbey Telephone Company decided to consolidate its operations under a single name, Whidbey Telecom. This new identity was previewed at the Island County Fair and was officially launched in September. In 2018, a each brand was assigned a color and word mark to provide a little distinction between divisions, with Whidbey Telecom Security and Alarms adopting a blue shield as its logo.

- 'Whidbey.NET' became 'Whidbey Telecom Internet and Broadband'
- 'Western Long Distance' became 'Whidbey Telecom Long Distance'
- 'American Alarm Systems, Inc.' became 'Whidbey Telecom Security and Alarms'

== Service area and exchanges ==
All operate in Area Code 360

=== Whidbey Island ===
Any new customers or lines are assigned numbers based on geographic location, but customers are no longer required to change prefix when moving between service areas (originally caused by a limitation of switching hardware).

- Clinton – 341
- Freeland – 331
- Langley –221
- Bayview – 321
- Locales outside of the service area with a South Whidbey number (Foreign Exchange) – 321
- Maxwellton Beach, Scatchet Head, and Sandy Hook/Cultus Bay – 579
- Bells Beach, Baby Island, Beverly Beach – 730
- Greenbank – 222 (Comcast also has a block of 222 numbers for their use for new services on South Whidbey Island)

Whidbey Telecom also is able to port in numbers served by Comcast, Asound, and Ziply Fiber as they expand into South Central Whidbey Island, adding 678 to its prefixes.

=== Point Roberts ===
- All Areas – 945

=== Hat (Gedney) Island ===
Hat Island Telephone Company

- All Areas – 444
