= Blaine Municipal Airport =

Defunct airport in Washington, United States

- IATA: BWS; ICAO: none; FAA LID: 4W6

Summary
- Airport type: Public
- Owner: City of Blaine
- Serves: Blaine, Washington
- Elevation AMSL: 75 ft (23 m)
- Coordinates: 48°59′24″N 122°43′57″W
- Interactive map of Blaine Municipal Airport

Runways
Direction	Length		Surface
Direction	ft	m	Surface
14/32	2,539	774	Asphalt

Statistics (2005)
- Aircraft operations: 8,000
- Based aircraft: 23
- Source: Federal Aviation Administration

Blaine Municipal Airport (IATA: BWS, FAA LID: 4W6) was a city-owned public-use airport, also known as Dierks Field, located one nautical mile (1.8 km) east of the central business district of Blaine, a city in Whatcom County, Washington, United States that borders Canada. It was closed on December 31, 2008.

== Facilities and aircraft ==
The airport covered an area of 42 acres (17 ha) at an elevation of 75 feet (23 m) above mean sea level. It had one runway designated 14/32 with a 2,539 by 40 feet (774 x 12 m) asphalt pavement. For the 12-month period ending December 31, 2005, the airport had 8,000 aircraft operations, an average of 21 per day, all general aviation. At that time, there were 23 aircraft based at this airport: 91% single-engine and 9% multi-engine.
