= Blaine School District =

School district in Washington, United States

Blaine School District No. 503 is a public school district in Whatcom County, Washington, USA, that serves the communities of Blaine, Point Roberts, and the majority of Birch Bay. Point Roberts is separated from the rest of the United States by the Canada–United States border. As of the 2022-23 school year the district had an enrollment of 2,094 students.

== Schools ==
Secondary schools

- Blaine High School
- Blaine Middle School

Primary and elementary schools

- Blaine Elementary School
- Blaine Primary School
- Point Roberts Primary School (the only school in Point Roberts, Kindergarten to 3rd grade)

Other schools

- Blaine Home Connection

== Demographics ==
As of the 2022-23 school year the enrollment figures for the district are:

Total students: 2,094

By ethnicity:
White: 67.4%
Black or African American 1.4%
Asian 4.8%
Hispanic/Latino of any race(s) 17.2%
Two or More Races 7.3%
American Indian/Alaska Native 1.2%
Native Hawaiian/Other Pacific Islander 0.7%

By gender:
Male: 52.4%
Female: 46.6%
Gender X: 1.0%

== Notable alumni ==
- Scott Gomez, a professional ice hockey player
- Luke Ridnour, a professional basketball player
