= Granger High School (Granger, Washington) =

High school in Washington, United States

Coordinates: 46°20′51.64″N 120°11′40.92″W

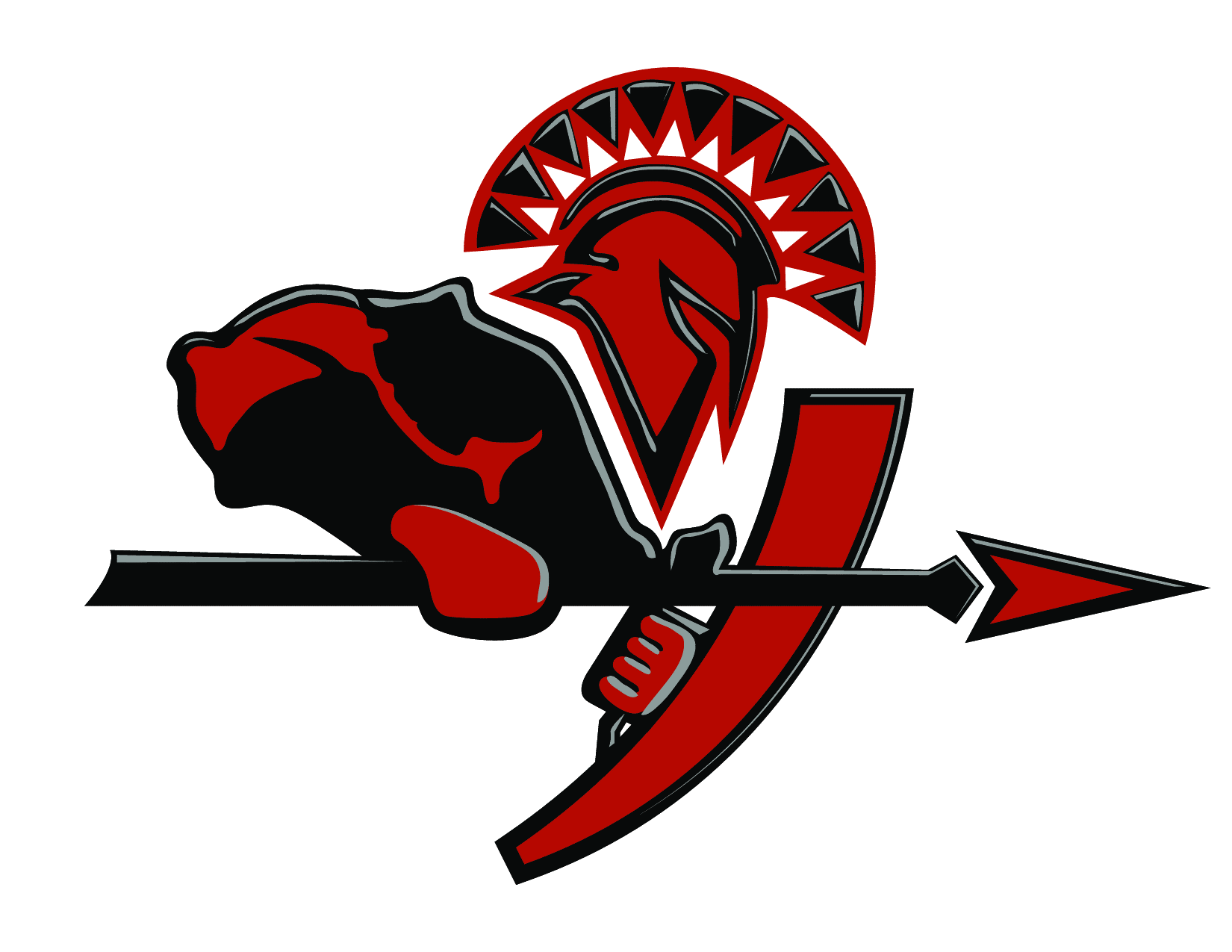

Location
- 315 East Mentzer Avenue; Granger, (Yakima County), Washington 98932; United States

Information
- Type: Public high school
- Principal: Josh Simmons
- Teaching staff: 25.39 (FTE)
- Enrollment: 408 (2023-2024)
- Student to teacher ratio: 16.07
- Colors: Red, white and black
- Nickname: Spartans

Granger High School is a public high school located in Granger, Washington. It serves 432 students in grades 9 through 12. Ninety percent of the students are Hispanic, while 5% are American Indian, 4% are White, and 1% are two or more races.

Mike Carlson has served as Granger High School Principal since 2018.

The main school classrooms were completed in 1965. An addition of four classrooms and a gymnasium was started in 2015 and opened to the public in the spring of 2017.

The Granger High School mascot is the Spartan.
