= Blaine, Washington =

Border city in Washington, United States

- City
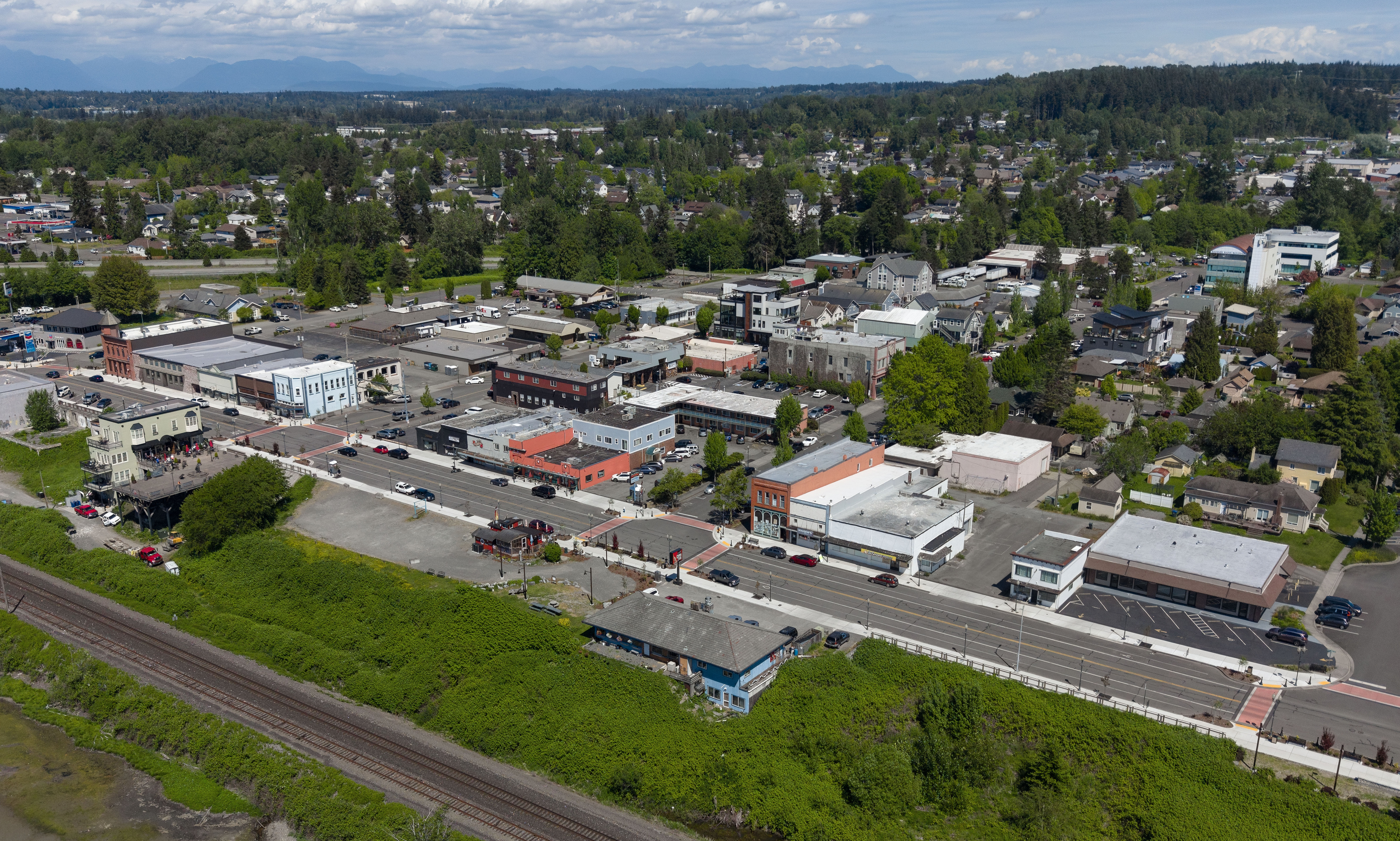
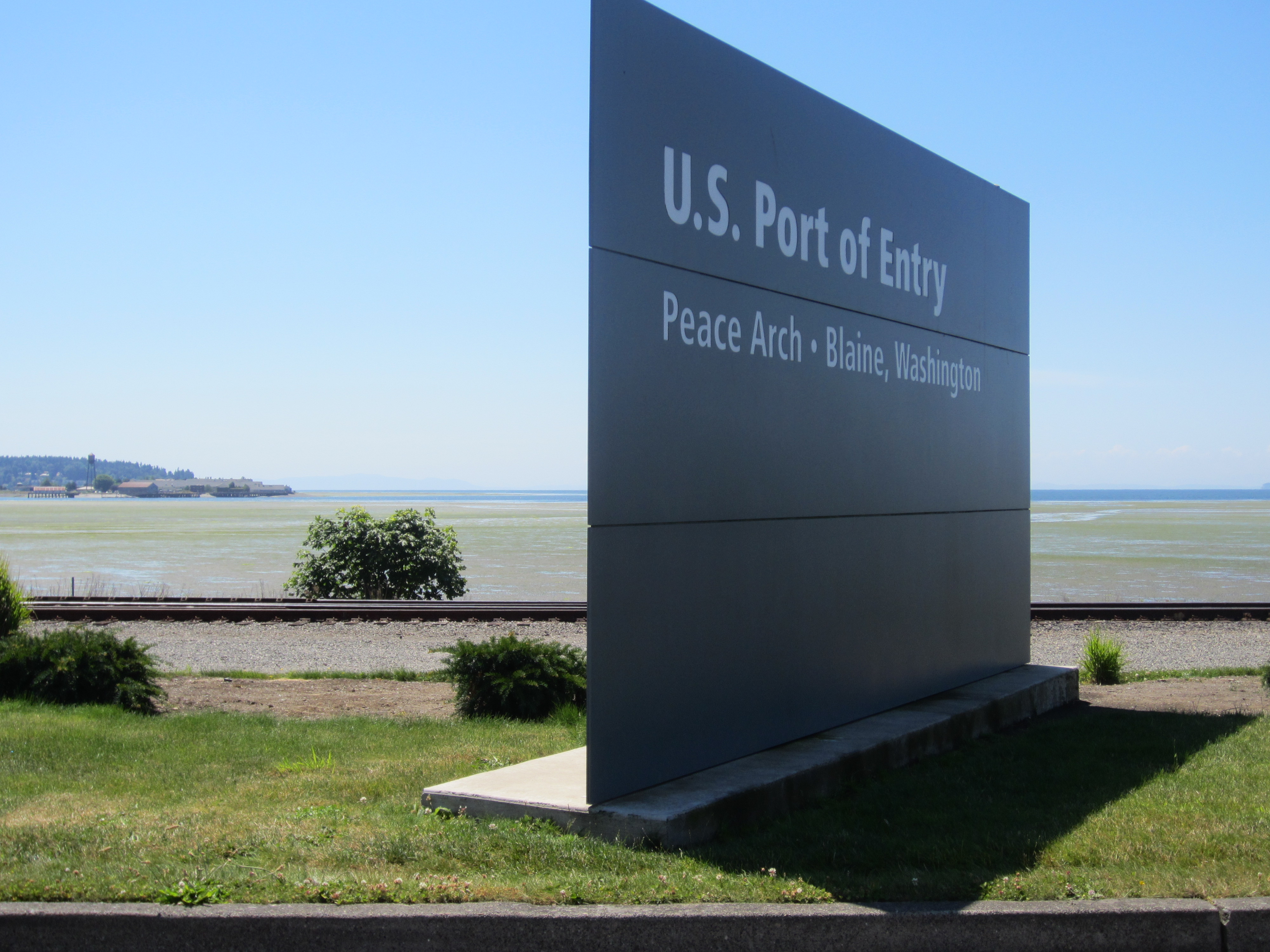
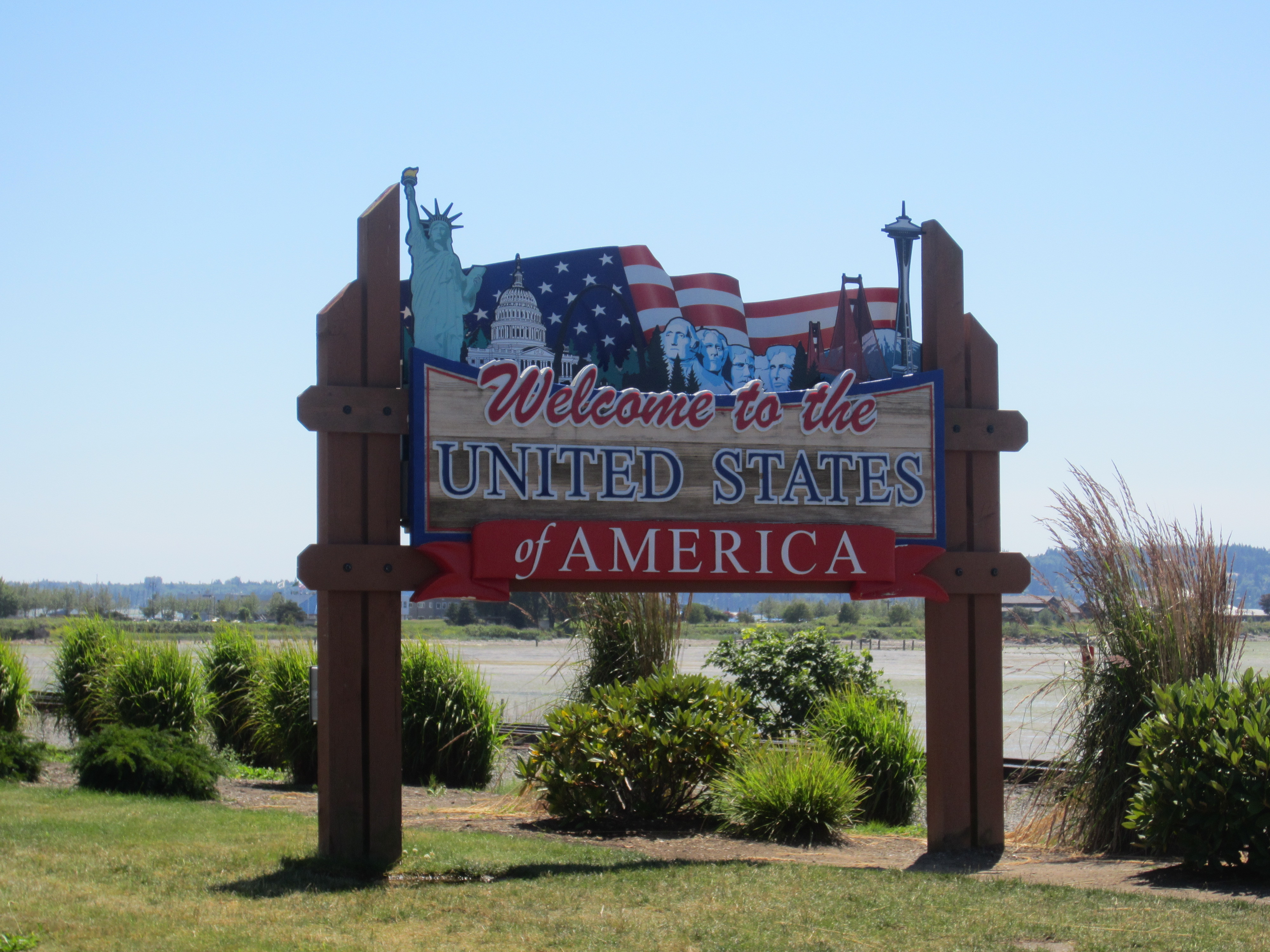
- From top: aerial view of downtown Blaine, view of U.S. Port of entry, Welcome to the United States of America sign

- Seal
- Nickname: The Peace Arch City
- Motto: Blaine is Where America Begins
- Location in the state of Washington and Whatcom County

- Location in the United States Blaine (the United States)
- Coordinates: 48°59′17″N 122°44′37″W
- Country: United States
- State: Washington
- County: Whatcom
- Incorporated: May 20, 1890

Government
  - Type: Council–manager
  - Mayor: Mary Lou Steward

Area
  - City: 8.62 sq mi (22.33 km^{2})
  - Land: 5.58 sq mi (14.45 km^{2})
  - Water: 3.04 sq mi (7.88 km^{2})
- Elevation: 7 ft (2.1 m)

Population (2020)
  - City: 5,884
  - Estimate (2022): 6,018
  - Density: 1,005.1/sq mi (388.08/km^{2})
  - Metro: 234,954 (Bellingham metropolitan area) (US: 204th)
  - Metro density: 109.4/sq mi (42.25/km^{2})
- Demonym: Blaineite
- Time zone: UTC-8 (Pacific (PST))
  - Summer (DST): UTC-7 (PDT)
- ZIP Codes: 98230 (home delivery) and 98231 (post office boxes)
- Area code: 360, 564
- FIPS code: 53-06505
- GNIS feature ID: 2409860
- Website: ci.blaine.wa.us

Blaine is a city in Whatcom County, Washington, United States. The city's northern boundary is the Canada–U.S. border; the Peace Arch international monument straddles the border of both countries. It is the fourth largest incorporated city within the Bellingham Metropolitan Area. The population was 5,884 at the 2020 census. As Blaine is located adjacent to the border with Canada, it is the northernmost city on Interstate 5.

== History ==
The land surrounding present day Drayton Harbor was historically occupied by the Semiahmoo people, which make up a portion of the ancestry of the current-day Lummi Nation. The area was settled in the mid-19th century by pioneers who established the town as a seaport for the west coast logging and fishing industries, and as a jumping off point for prospectors heading to British Columbia's gold fields.

In 1880, the Alaska Packers Association destroyed a Semiahmoo village and usurped their village site for a salmon cannery on Semiahmoo Spit.

Blaine was incorporated on May 20, 1890, and was named after James G. Blaine (1830−1893), who was a U.S. senator from the state of Maine, Secretary of State, and, in 1884, the unsuccessful Republican presidential candidate. The city has a "turn-of-the-century" theme, marked by remodeled buildings and signs resembling designs that existed during the late 19th century and early 20th century.

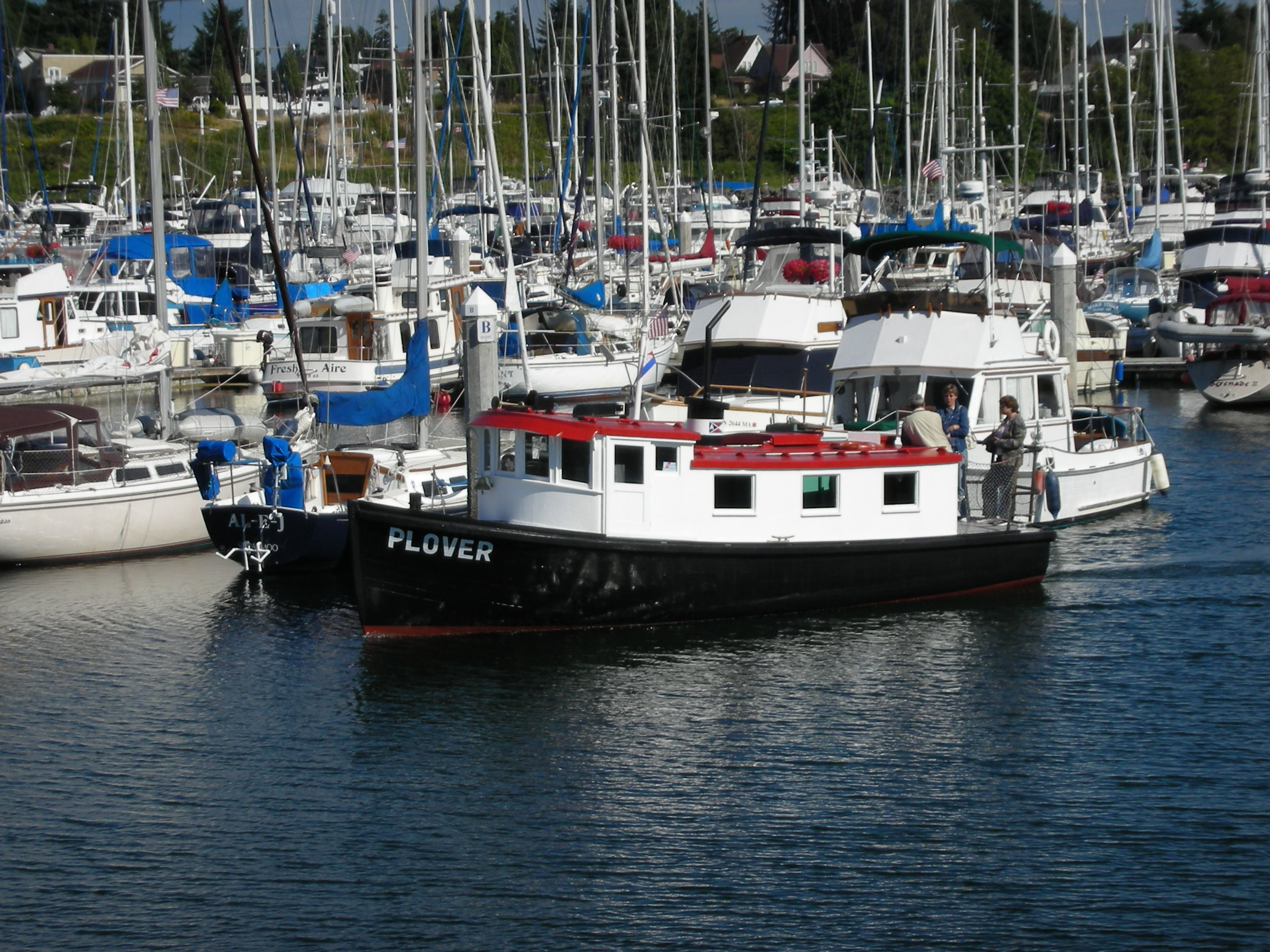
The MV Plover once conveyed workers to and from the cannery in the 1940s. Today it ferries tourists from Blaine to a resort on Semiahmoo Spit.

The world's largest salmon cannery was operated by the Alaska Packers' Association for decades in Blaine; the cannery site has been converted to a waterfront destination resort on Semiahmoo Spit. Several saw mills once operated on Blaine's waterfront, and much of the lumber was transported from its wharves and docks to help rebuild San Francisco following the 1906 fire there. The forests were soon logged but Blaine's fishing industry remained strong into the second half of the 20th century. Into the 1970s Blaine was home to hundreds of commercial purse seiners and gillnetters plying the waters offshore of British Columbia, between Washington state and southeast Alaska. Blaine's two large marinas are still home to hundreds of recreational sailboats and yachts. Nature lovers have always appreciated Blaine's coastal location, its accessible bike and walking trails, and view of mountains and water. Birdwatchers across the continent have discovered the area's high content of migratory birds and waterfowl: Blaine's Drayton Harbor, Semiahmoo Spit and Boundary Bay are ranked as Important Birding Areas by the Audubon Society.

The Cains are the most notable family in Blaine's short history, credited with its founding and achievements. At one time owning most of present-day Blaine, the Cain brothers erected the biggest store north of Seattle, a lumber and shingle mill, a hotel (largest in the state at the time), the first public wharf, and donated large public tracts of land.

Nathan Cornish and family moved to Blaine in 1889. He became mayor in 1901; his platform was "twelve miles of wooden sidewalk". His daughter, Nellie Cornish, having failed to open a successful piano teaching business in Blaine, moved to Seattle, where she founded the Cornish College of the Arts in 1914, which still exists today.

On May 9, 1970, approximately 450 Canadian protestors demonstrating against the Cambodian campaign of the Vietnam War crossed the border and conducted a "symbolic invasion" of Blaine. Several buildings' windows were smashed, flags were torn down, and the Peace Arch was vandalized before police officers and vigilantes pushed the protestors back to the Canadian side of the border.

The land at Semiahmoo Spit has been repeatedly used by the City of Blaine for an industrial site and dumping of waste, despite it being the location of an ancient Lummi village and burial ground. It is estimated that as many as 30 percent of the local Lummi citizens have relatives that were buried in the graveyard, which may date back 4500 years. The problem culminated in 1999, when a contractor hired by the city to build a sewage plant carted away tons of material containing bones and artifacts. Some of it was later found as far away as Colorado. As the result of a federal lawsuit in 2004, the Lummi Nation received $3.5 million in compensation from the contractor as well as title to two acreas of land on Semiahmoo Spit.

== Geography ==
According to the United States Census Bureau, the city has a total area of 8.43 square miles (21.83 km^{2}), of which, 5.63 square miles (14.58 km^{2}) is land and 2.80 square miles (7.25 km^{2}) is water. Blaine's motto is "Where America Begins": the community is also known as "The Gateway to the Pacific Northwest", and the "Peace Arch City". All these phrases are commentaries on Blaine's unique locale. It lies at the northernmost point of the north-south U.S. Interstate 5 and next to Drayton Harbor and Boundary Bay (the southward extension of Boundary Bay is officially named and often referred to as Semiahmoo Bay).

A 2024 proposal for a 211-unit luxury condominium development adjacent to Semiahmoo Marina on Semiahmoo Spit hit a roadblock when it failed to take into account the state-required shoreline setback.

=== Climate ===
Blaine lies between the mountains east of Vancouver, the flatlands of Skagit County, Washington, the North Cascades (including Mount Baker), and the south end of Vancouver Island. Blaine has a borderline climate between mediterranean (Csb) and maritime (Cfb), which provides fairly mild weather from the rest of the Pacific Northwest. With annual precipitation of about 40 inches (1,000 mm) and its milder location, Blaine enjoys more sunny days and a milder climate than neighboring communities.

Climate data for Blaine, Washington (1991–2020 normals, extremes 1893–2021)
Month	Jan	Feb	Mar	Apr	May	Jun	Jul	Aug	Sep	Oct	Nov	Dec	Year
Record high °F (°C)	64 (18)	68 (20)	72 (22)	83 (28)	86 (30)	98 (37)	95 (35)	97 (36)	87 (31)	78 (26)	71 (22)	63 (17)	98 (37)
Mean maximum °F (°C)	54.5 (12.5)	55.4 (13.0)	60.7 (15.9)	67.7 (19.8)	74.8 (23.8)	77.9 (25.5)	80.8 (27.1)	81.3 (27.4)	75.1 (23.9)	66.0 (18.9)	59.1 (15.1)	54.0 (12.2)	83.3 (28.5)
Mean daily maximum °F (°C)	44.7 (7.1)	47.7 (8.7)	52.1 (11.2)	57.6 (14.2)	64.0 (17.8)	68.5 (20.3)	72.8 (22.7)	72.7 (22.6)	66.9 (19.4)	57.4 (14.1)	49.6 (9.8)	44.2 (6.8)	58.2 (14.6)
Daily mean °F (°C)	39.3 (4.1)	41.1 (5.1)	44.9 (7.2)	49.8 (9.9)	55.7 (13.2)	60.3 (15.7)	64.0 (17.8)	63.8 (17.7)	58.6 (14.8)	50.7 (10.4)	43.8 (6.6)	39.2 (4.0)	50.9 (10.5)
Mean daily minimum °F (°C)	33.9 (1.1)	34.6 (1.4)	37.7 (3.2)	41.9 (5.5)	47.3 (8.5)	52.1 (11.2)	55.1 (12.8)	54.9 (12.7)	50.4 (10.2)	44.0 (6.7)	37.9 (3.3)	34.1 (1.2)	43.7 (6.5)
Mean minimum °F (°C)	20.5 (−6.4)	23.7 (−4.6)	26.5 (−3.1)	32.3 (0.2)	36.9 (2.7)	43.2 (6.2)	47.8 (8.8)	47.3 (8.5)	41.1 (5.1)	32.9 (0.5)	25.2 (−3.8)	21.4 (−5.9)	16.0 (−8.9)
Record low °F (°C)	−1 (−18)	−9 (−23)	11 (−12)	21 (−6)	21 (−6)	31 (−1)	34 (1)	33 (1)	25 (−4)	19 (−7)	5 (−15)	−1 (−18)	−9 (−23)
Average precipitation inches (mm)	6.17 (157)	3.37 (86)	4.21 (107)	2.97 (75)	2.57 (65)	1.93 (49)	1.14 (29)	1.13 (29)	2.22 (56)	4.39 (112)	6.08 (154)	5.63 (143)	41.81 (1,062)
Average snowfall inches (cm)	3.7 (9.4)	0.8 (2.0)	1.0 (2.5)	0.0 (0.0)	0.0 (0.0)	0.0 (0.0)	0.0 (0.0)	0.0 (0.0)	0.0 (0.0)	0.1 (0.25)	0.4 (1.0)	3.3 (8.4)	9.3 (23.55)
Average precipitation days (≥ 0.01 in)	18.6	14.8	17.8	14.6	10.9	10.2	5.8	6.3	9.0	15.7	19.0	19.1	161.8
Average snowy days (≥ 0.1 in)	1.2	0.4	0.4	0.0	0.0	0.0	0.0	0.0	0.0	0.1	0.2	0.8	3.1
Source 1: NOAA
Source 2: National Weather Service

=== Canada–U.S. border ===
Blaine is home to two main West Coast ports of entry between the United States and Canada. The Peace Arch Border Crossing, which is the northern terminus of I-5 and southern terminus of B.C. provincial Highway 99, serves as the primary passenger vehicle port of entry. The Pacific Highway Border Crossing, approximately one mile to the east, serves as the primary point of entry for heavy truck traffic, and thus is also known as the Truck Crossing. The latter is reached via Washington State Route 543 which departs I-5 on the south side of Blaine and connects at the border to B.C.'s Highway 15 (Surrey's 176th Street) and then to the Trans-Canada Highway.

Construction of a new Land Port of Entry (LPOE) was completed by the U.S. General Services Administration in 2011. A large public art installation entitled "Non-Sign II" was erected near the crossing booths. The art piece is a "blank space" in the shape of a billboard sign, surrounded by a mass of twisted metal rods. On the Canadian side, a new Port of Entry building was constructed by the Canada Border Services Agency. It was officially opened by Public Safety Minister Peter Van Loan on August 20, 2009. It was built partly to reduce delays for travelers coming to the 2010 Winter Olympics which were held in Vancouver and Whistler February 12–28, 2010.

International border intrigue has always been a part of Blaine's ambiance. Smuggling became an underground industry in 1919 with the passage of the Volstead Act banning liquor sale and use in the United States. Rum-running and border jumping thrived along Blaine's shared coastline with British Columbia, due in part to the area's largest whiskey still being located on Texada Island, which is located in the northern Strait of Georgia offshore from the city of Powell River, British Columbia. This continued until Prohibition was repealed in 1933 (coincidentally, the U.S. Congressional law which re-legalized alcohol is named the Blaine Act). In subsequent decades, the situation was reversed due to restrictive drinking and entertainment laws in British Columbia, notably a ban on Sunday drinking, which led to Blaine and its sister border towns of Point Roberts and Sumas booming with taverns and adult entertainment of various kinds. Those days are long gone and now Blaine's retail sector consists of goods such as gasoline, dairy products and clothing outlets, as these goods are cheaper in the U.S.

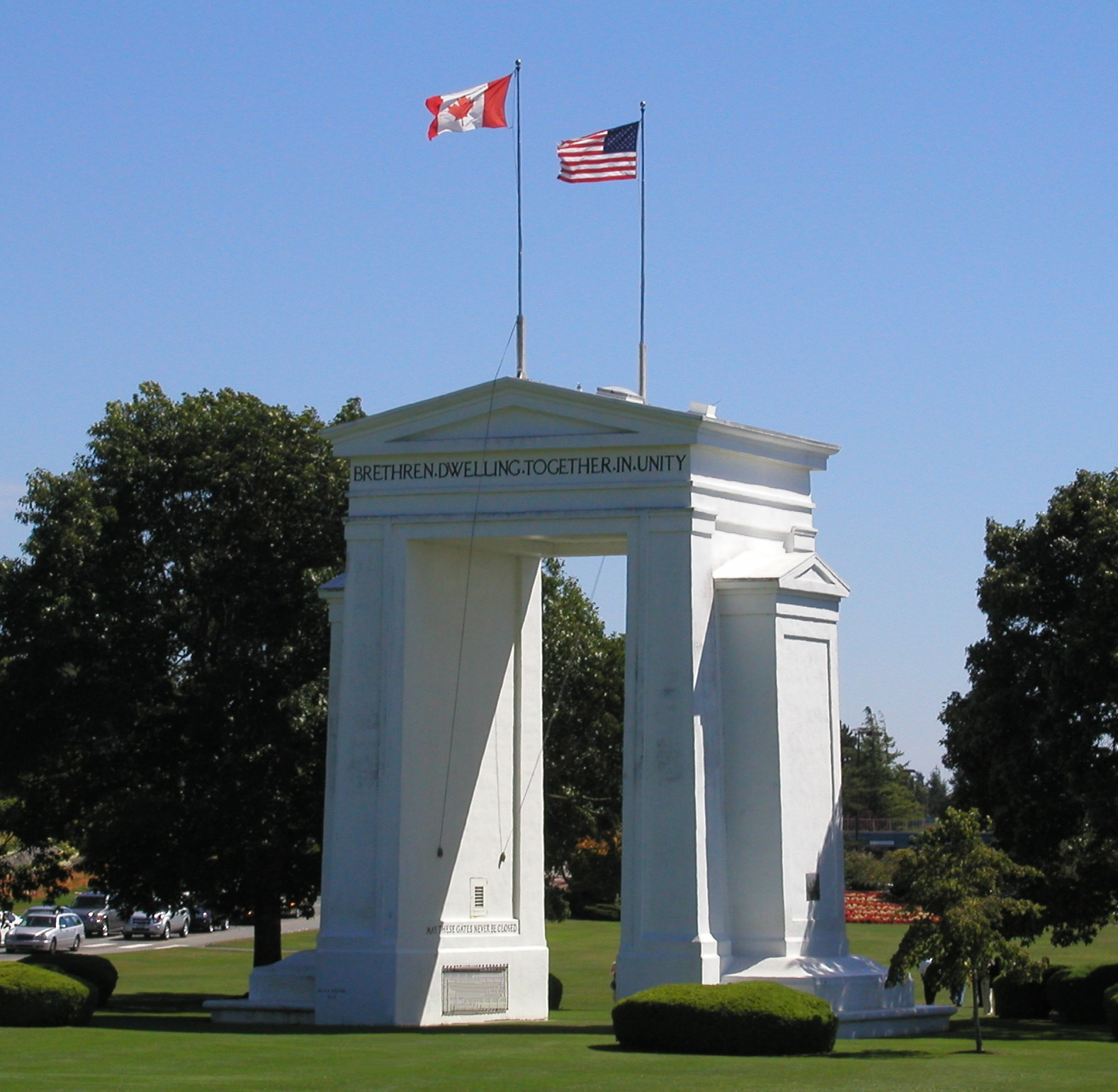
The Peace Arch is a monument on the Canada–U.S. border, where I-5 becomes Hwy 99 and enters British Columbia.

In the 1990s, smuggling again reached a zenith with exports of high grade marijuana from neighboring British Columbia, and corresponding flow of cocaine and handguns from the United States into Canada. As the production of 'BC Bud' grew across British Columbia, a sometimes dangerous game of cat and mouse played out along Blaine's border with Canada. Smugglers used every technique, from backpacks to helicopter aerial drops to bring tons of the marijuana crop into the U.S., while a growing phalanx of local, state, provincial and federal law enforcement from both sides of the border sought ways to stem the tide. Following the terrorist attacks of 2001, the addition of hundreds of federal agents and millions of dollars in enforcement technology have pushed much of the smuggling activity into the rugged interior of Washington.

The International Peace Arch, dedicated September 6, 1921, by Samuel Hill, is located within Peace Arch State Park in Blaine and is occasionally used as a focal point for peaceful demonstrations and debate, such as the annual setting of crosses for each American killed so far in the Iraq War. But most of the people who visit or pass by the park each year remember it for its beauty and peaceful shoreline setting (although the beach is not officially accessible from the park).

The Interstate 5 freeway extends from the U.S./Mexico border at San Diego, northward to Canada, and terminates in Blaine at the city's northern border. The country's only pedestrian crosswalk to cross an Interstate freeway exists in Peace Arch State Park, the Washington portion of the binational Peace Arch Park. The Canadian side of the park, designated as Peace Arch Provincial Park, is in Douglas, the Canadian port-of-entry and part of the city of Surrey, British Columbia. The Peace Arch monument, located in the park, symbolizes lasting peace and amity between the U.S. and Canada. One innovative feature that has never been abrogated even during the days since 9/11 is that people entering the park from either side may have the unique experience of strolling to the opposite park's boundary amid flowers, ponds, and works of art, without having to go through customs facilities. The park has been described as a place of bi-national mingling and also hosts wedding ceremonies.

In 2006, a local group called the Blaine Peace Alliance unsuccessfully solicited City Council support to formalize a sister-city relationship with Pugwash, Nova Scotia, where promotion of world peace had been an ongoing effort for 50 years. Because Pugwash affiliated itself with the Pugwash Conferences on Science and World Affairs, the Council ruled such a connection would be "political". Shortly thereafter, the Alliance disbanded.

Since 1937, an annual celebration known as "Hands Across the Border" has been held at the park, sponsored by the International Peace Arch Association. Hundreds of Scouts from the U.S. and Canada are in attendance and the highways and Ports of Entry on both sides of the border are closed for several hours for the event. There is a procession of Troops and world flags through the Peace Arch, signifying Scout unity around the world. Speeches are made by honored Scouts from Washington and British Columbia, and State, Provincial and local dignitaries attend. On February 28, 2013, after 90 years, the event's former organizers announced that "Hands Across the Border" had been cancelled. However, following public support the annual program was re-established in 2015.

== Demographics ==
Historical population
Census	Pop.	Note	%±
1890	1,563		—
1900	1,592		1.9%
1910	2,289		43.8%
1920	2,254		−1.5%
1930	1,642		−27.2%
1940	1,524		−7.2%
1950	1,693		11.1%
1960	1,735		2.5%
1970	1,955		12.7%
1980	2,363		20.9%
1990	2,489		5.3%
2000	3,770		51.5%
2010	4,684		24.2%
2020	5,884		25.6%
2022 (est.)	6,018		2.3%
U.S. Decennial Census; 2020 Census

The city's population has been exaggerated at times: "Population now 1,735 as against peak of 14,000 in the 1920s", declared the December 27, 1964 issue of the Seattle Post-Intelligencer.

=== 2020 census ===
As of the 2020 census, there were 5,884 people and 2,431 households in the city; the median age was 46.1 years, 20.0% of residents were under the age of 18, and 24.6% were 65 years of age or older. For every 100 females there were 92.4 males, and for every 100 females age 18 and over there were 91.0 males age 18 and over.

There were 2,744 housing units, of which 11.4% were vacant. The homeowner vacancy rate was 2.0% and the rental vacancy rate was 4.8%.

95.7% of residents lived in urban areas, while 4.3% lived in rural areas.

Racial composition as of the 2020 census
Race	Number	Percent
White	4,581	77.9%
Black or African American	76	1.3%
American Indian and Alaska Native	80	1.4%
Asian	406	6.9%
Native Hawaiian and Other Pacific Islander	88	1.5%
Some other race	120	2.0%
Two or more races	533	9.1%
Hispanic or Latino (of any race)	464	7.9%

=== 2010 census ===
As of the 2010 census, there were 4,684 people, 1,994 households, and 1,291 families residing in the city. The population density was 832.0 inhabitants per square mile (321.2/km^{2}). There were 2,346 housing units at an average density of 416.7 units per square mile (160.9 units/km^{2}). The racial makeup of the city was 86.5% White, 1.4% African American, 0.9% Native American, 5.1% Asian, 1.3% Pacific Islander, 0.7% from other races, and 4.2% from two or more races. Hispanic or Latino of any race were 5.0% of the population.

There were 1,994 households, of which 27.1% had children under the age of 18 living with them, 49.5% were married couples living together, 11.0% had a female householder with no husband present, 4.2% had a male householder with no wife present, and 35.3% were non-families. 30.1% of all households were made up of individuals, and 12% had someone living alone who was 65 years of age or older. The average household size was 2.32 and the average family size was 2.85.

The median age in the city was 44.3 years. 21.4% of residents were under the age of 18; 7.4% were between the ages of 18 and 24; 22% were from 25 to 44; 30.1% were from 45 to 64; and 19.1% were 65 years of age or older. The gender makeup of the city was 49.1% male and 50.9% female.

=== 2000 census ===
As of the 2000 census, there were 3,770 people, 1,496 households, and 1,036 families residing in the city. The population density was 680.4 people per square mile (262.7 people/km^{2}). There were 1,737 housing units at an average density of 313.5 units per square mile (121.0 units/km^{2}). The racial makeup of the city was 87.72% White, 1.19% African American, 1.14% Native American, 4.19% Asian, 0.66% Pacific Islander, 1.33% from other races, and 3.77% from two or more races. Hispanic or Latino of any race were 4.35% of the population.

There were 1,496 households, out of which 32.1% had children under the age of 18 living with them, 52.9% were married couples living together, 12.4% had a female householder with no husband present, 4% had a male householder with no wife present, and 30.7% were non-families. 25.5% of all households were made up of individuals, and 10.1% had someone living alone who was 65 years of age or older. The average household size was 2.48 and the average family size was 2.96.

In the city, the age distribution of the population shows 26.5% under the age of 18, 6.9% from 18 to 24, 26.4% from 25 to 44, 25.7% from 45 to 64, and 14.4% who were 65 years of age or older. The median age was 39 years. For every 100 females, there were 94.5 males. For every 100 females age 18 and over, there were 90.2 males.

The median income for a household in the city was $36,900, and the median income for a family was $45,056. Males had a median income of $36,381 versus $23,561 for females. The per capita income for the city was $20,333. About 10.2% of families and 15.5% of the population were below the poverty line, including 16.6% of those under age 18 and 8.3% of those age 65 or over.

== Economy ==
Much of Blaine's economy is based on cross-border Canadian trade, which includes parcel shipping services and gas stations. The eastern side of the city accommodates a number of import/export warehouses, freight and courier services and gas stations serving long-haul cargo trucks. The Customs and Border Protection branch of the Department of Homeland Security operates two border inspection stations in Blaine. The Blaine Sector Headquarters of the U.S. Border Patrol employs hundreds of federal law enforcement officers and support staff in the community.

Blaine also has a number of manufacturing companies, including Nature's Path cereal and Totally Chocolate.

The Port of Bellingham operates a large marina in Blaine, serving a variety of pleasure craft and fishing vessels. In a March 25, 2026 article at The Northern Light, the Washington Department of Ecology calls for public input on the $28 million cleanup of the former Westman Marine site, contaminated with petroleum products, metals, and PCBs.

As Vancouver, British Columbia is just north of Blaine, across the US-Canada border and where several prime-time television series are recorded, several dozen U.S. actors/actresses have rented houses in Blaine and commute to Vancouver rather than rent houses and apartments in Vancouver, which is much more expensive. Included series are: Once Upon A Time, Beauty and the Beast, Supernatural and Nikita. For similar reasons, a significant number of Americans who work for companies in Vancouver are living in Blaine.

The United States Consulate in Vancouver has a Blaine address for mail from the U.S. Several mail service companies have opened branches in Blaine, targeting Canadian residents looking to avoid cross-border shipping costs. The local industry grew during the rise of e-commerce in the early 2000s and the city set up a sales tax that earns $1.7 million in annual revenue.

Blaine had a small airport, which was popular with light aircraft owners for its low fuel prices and because it had less fog than other nearby airports. The runway measured 2,539 by 40 feet (774 m × 12 m). The Blaine city government operated automated fuel pumps. In the spring of 2006 the city government removed several tall trees south of the runway as a safety precaution. Then in 2007, the City Council voted to close the airport before the end of 2008. The airport was officially closed on December 31, 2008. The land upon which the airport rests is adjacent to a shopping center and light industrial park. The area is now zoned for mixed use development, including light industrial manufacturing and commercial.

== Education ==
The Blaine School District has five public schools that serves the city as well as adjacent unincorporated communities, including Birch Bay and Point Roberts. The largest share of school services is consolidated on a campus in central Blaine, which has facilities for approximately 2,100 students, including Blaine High School, Blaine Middle School, and Blaine Elementary School. Students from the small nearby exclave of Point Roberts above 3rd grade are bused through the border to Blaine to attend school which means crossing two international borders one way and four international borders during the day.

== Infrastructure ==
=== Transportation ===
Blaine is at the north end of Interstate 5 (I-5), the main north–south freeway in the West Coast states. The freeway terminates at the Peace Arch Border Crossing and has a spur route, State Route 543, that serves the Pacific Highway Border Crossing to the east; commercial vehicles such as trucks and buses are required to use the eastern crossing. Another state highway, State Route 548, travels south from Blaine to Birch Bay and the Cherry Point Refinery. The city is also served by Whatcom Transportation Authority buses that connect it to Ferndale and Bellingham.

The Great Northern Railway opened a passenger and freight depot serving Blaine in 1909, shortly after completing construction of its waterfront railroad. Amtrak's Pacific International began serving the station in 1972 and operated daily trains that stopped there until 1981. Passengers were initially required to disembark from the train at Blaine station to use a customs station until 1974, when processing was switched to on-board agents. Restoration of the depot and Amtrak service on the modern Cascades service has been proposed in the 21st century to serve Blaine and areas of Metro Vancouver.

== Notable people ==
- Carlos Becerra, television presenter
- Luke Ridnour, former NBA player
