= Blaine High School (Washington) =

Location
- 1055 H Street; Blaine, Washington 98230; 48°59′34″N 122°44′17″W

Information
- Type: Public
- Motto: Each Student, Each Day.
- School district: Blaine School District
- Principal: Elizabeth Eide
- Staff: 31.51 (FTE)
- Grades: 9–12
- Average class size: 30
- Student to teacher ratio: 18.69
- Colors: Orange & Black
- Athletics conference: Northwest Conference 1A
- Mascot: Archie the Arch
- Rival: Lynden Christian High School
- Feeder schools: Blaine Middle School
- Website: Blaine High School

Blaine High School, established in 1906, is located in Blaine, Washington, United States, which is situated in the northwest corner of the state, adjacent to the Canada–US border, thus making it the most northwestern high school in the Contiguous United States. The school operates within the Blaine School District and serves approximately 589 students in grades 9-12. It is ranked 39th out of 539 high schools in the state.

The student-teacher ratio of 19:1 is equal to the state average. The 80% graduation rate is higher than the state average of 77%. The school's spending/student of $10,218 is higher than the state average of $8,997.

Blaine High School also operates Borderite Stadium, a multipurpose stadium used for the school’s athletic activities.

== Mascot and colors ==
The school's colors are orange and black. The school's mascot is Buddy the Borderite, referring to the people of the community itself as Blaine sits directly on the British Columbia / Washington state border.

== Demographics ==
As of the 2023-24 school year, Blaine High School has the ratio of 312 male students to 276 female students.

The ethnic enrollment totals for Blaine High School are as follows:

5 - American Indian/Alaskan Native

32 - Asian

9 - African American

97 - Hispanic

399 - White/Caucasian

3 - Native Hawaiian/Pacific Islander

43 - Two or more races

The school’s enrollment by grade includes 146 freshmen, 149 sophomores, 152 juniors, and 142 seniors.

== Academics ==
At Blaine High School, students have the opportunity to take Advanced Placement coursework and exams. The AP participation rate at Blaine High School is 16%. The total minority enrollment is 34%, and 46% of students are economically disadvantaged.

Proficiency rates via U.S. News are as follows: 71% of students are proficient in reading, 38% of students are proficient in mathematics, and 64% of students are proficient in science.

== Athletics ==
Blaine has a long history of athletic success, with back to back basketball state championships in 1999 and 2000, which were led primarily by future NBA player Luke Ridnour.

The Borderites also have lone state championships in various other sports including baseball, football, softball, golf, and girls tennis.

Since the early days of the school, there has intense competition between Blaine High School and Lynden Christian High School. The schools are separated by a 20 minutes drive. The rivalry has died down over recent years, but remains spirited.

All of Blaine’s athletic events are sanctioned by the Washington Interscholastic Activities Association (WIAA).

The athletic director is Chas Kok.

=== State Championships ===
Blaine has won seven state championships.

- Basketball (Boys): 1999 (1A), 2000 (1A)
- Baseball: 1990 (1A)
- Football: 1978 (1A)
- Golf (Boys): 2005 (2A)
- Track & Field (Girls): 2009 (2A)
- Wrestling (Boys): 2014 (1A)

== Athletic Facilities ==
=== Borderite Stadium ===
The football, soccer, and track teams host their home events at the 2,056 capacity Borderite Stadium. The stadium is one of the most important in the county due to its proximity to the Canadian border and its ability to host various events such as track meets, collegiate games, crowd gatherings, and graduations.

In 2022, Borderite Stadium served as an alternate home venue for the 2022 Simon Fraser University football team due to vaccine mandates limiting travel across the Canada–United States border.

=== Blaine High School Gym ===
The basketball, and volleyball teams play their home games in the 1,000 capacity Blaine High School Gym. Wrestling meets also are hosted here occasionally.

The gym is also where the school hosts their assemblies and gatherings of students, due to the poor weather conditions common in the Pacific Northwest.

=== Ken Waters Gym ===
Though not specific to the high school, the Ken Waters Gym is used for athletics by the school for its C-Team and Junior Varsity indoor sports, despite the gym mainly being used for Middle School sports.

=== Pipeline Fields ===
Baseball and softball take place at Pipeline Fields, an athletic complex around a mile away from the school that has 2 baseball-specific fields, 1 softball specific field, and 3 other fields that are used for softball and baseball simultaneously.

The complex also includes soccer fields, but no soccer linked to the school takes place there.

== Notable alumni ==
- Doug Goldsby - former CFL football player
- Scott Gomez - ice hockey player
- Luke Ridnour - former professional basketball player
- Bob Robertson - longtime Northwest play-by-play sportscaster
