= Sunnyside, Surrey =

Coordinates: 49°2.7′N 122°49′W

Sunnyside
- Neighbourhood
- Location of Surrey in Metro Vancouver
- Country: Canada
- Province: British Columbia
- Region: Lower Mainland
- Regional District: Metro Vancouver
- City: Surrey, British Columbia

Government
  - Mayor: Brenda Locke of Surrey
  - MP (Fed.): Dianne Watts
  - MLA (B.C.): Gordon Hogg
- Time zone: UTC-8 (PST)

Sunnyside is a neighbourhood of South Surrey, which in turn is a region of Surrey, British Columbia, Canada.

== History ==
=== Origin of the name ===
There is no historical significance to the name, other than that its location is on the sunnier, south slope of the "uplands" of Surrey, on the Semiahmoo peninsula.

=== First Nations and the Semiahmoo Trail ===
Semiahmoo Trail Pedestrian Overpass over 148th Street

As traders, the original Coast Salish peoples since the last Ice Age established communities at the mouths of the local rivers, the Nicomekl, Serpentine, and Campbell Rivers, which connected them to inland communities.

As the forebears of the present Semiahmoo First Nation faced raids from northern First Nations' groups, they used what came to be known as the Sunnyside area as access to a fort built in the 1830s on what is now the Ocean Park bluffs.

The Semiahmoo also used a route across the Sunnyside area of South Surrey to cross the ridge between the Campbell River to the south and Mud Bay to the north, where the Nicomekl and Serpentine were. By 1890 this was called the Semiahmoo Trail.

=== Telegraph Trail (The Collins Overland Telegraph) ===
The Telegraph Trail was built along this route in 1865 meant as part of a telegraph linkage from the mainland-USA through Alaska and Siberia to Europe. Initially it was known as The Collins Overland Trail, and the first message carried on it to New Westminster was to report the assassination of Abraham Lincoln in April 1865. The line reached New Westminster from the USA in June 1865. It also provided access from the Nicomekl River a few miles north, to the Boundary Commission Camp located at the mouth of the Little Campbell River at the Canada–United States border. The Boundary Commission Camp had been established in 1858.

The Semiahmoo Wagon Road was built in 1872-4 to connect the Fraser River to the north with Blaine, Washington, to the south. In 1878, stage service on the Semiahmoo Trail increased to twice weekly, between Brown’s Landing and the border to the south. In 1882 the Canadian Customs Department established the first near-border facility, an “out-port” customs office at Elgin north of the Sunnyside area. This was located where the Semiahmoo Trail met the Nicomekl River and operated until 1891. When the railway was relocated to Hazelmere to the east of Sunnyside, the land crossing at Douglas, B.C./Blaine, Washington, became the main customs area.

Led by then Alderman Garry Watkins, in 1977 the (then) District of Surrey proclaimed it a Designated Heritage site. South of 24th Avenue, the present trail deviates slightly from the original route, but on 148 Street there is a specially constructed "Semiahmoo Trail" pedestrian overpass keeping the trail intact.

=== European homesteading and road building ===
James Crutchley homesteaded 160 acres (0.65 km^{2}) in 1894 at what is now the corner of Sunnyside Road (24th Avenue) and the Coast Meridian Road. William B. Stokes settled in 1913 near where the present 20th Avenue (Stokes Road) crosses the Semiahmoo Trail. In 1917 Apex Logging operated between Sunnyside Road and Stokes Road near the old Pacific Coast Highway.

In 1918, there was still land available for pre-emption in the Sunnyside area and John Holttum chose a site west of what became Stayte Road (160 Street), along Oliver Road (28 Avenue).

The social focus, after the early 1920s, was Hazelmere Hall, built by the volunteer labour of local residents on land donated by carpenter Ernest Hamel. Residents recall parties at the hall, dancing to the music of pianist Andy Westland and his orchestra.

In 1927 what was to become the King George Highway was built through the area. Construction Camp 205 was situated at Sunnyside Road and worked southeast to the Peace Arch from there. A building from Camp 206 was moved to what is now 24th Avenue and 156th Street to serve as the Sunnyside Hall on land donated by George Cook. Sunnyside United Church held its first service in 1949 in the Sunnyside Hall.

In 1958 the City of White Rock seceded from the District of Surrey and the effect was immediately felt in the Sunnyside area. The White Rock-Sunnyside Fire Department hall #13 relocated from what is now the corner of 16th Avenue and 152nd Street (the new municipal border) up to Sunnyside Road (24th Avenue) in the 15300 block. This became known as the Sunnyside Fire Department.

In 1962 the present route of Highway #99 bisected the Sunnyside area, running from 8th Avenue in South Surrey, along the north side of Mud Bay, to the North Arm of the Fraser River. The opening of the Massey Tunnel on Highway #99 in 1962 and the Alex Fraser Bridge in 1986 enabled access to centres north of the Fraser River and in turn initiated suburban housing booms in the Sunnyside area which are still underway.

=== Sunnyside Acres Urban Forest ===
Entrance to Sunnyside Acres Urban Forest at 24th Ave. (Sunnyside Road)

The Sunnyside Acres Urban Forest is a 130-acre (0.53 km^{2}) second growth forest bounded on the east by 148th Street and bisected by 24th Avenue. The southern boundary is 20th Avenue and the forest's western limit is 140th street to 24th Avenue. It was created in 1988 by city by-law.

The Sunnyside Acres Heritage Society arranges guided tours of the many trails some of which are wheelchair accessible. At the south end are large softball diamonds and a hockey rink where the Surrey Eagles junior team plays.

== Geography ==
Sunnyside is located centrally on the uplands and mainly towards the plateau and south slope of the Semiahmoo Peninsula. Sunnyside borders the neighbourhoods of Crescent Beach and Ocean Park to the west, the city of White Rock to the south, the historic areas of Elgin and Mud Bay to the north and the new commercial retail area of Grandview Heights to the east. King George Highway (Highway #99A) bisects the eastern part of the area from the northwest to southeast as it runs to the United States border.

== Economy ==
Logging came to the South Surrey region in 1886 after the Gilley brothers had opened their mill at Elgin in 1885. The brothers were the first to use horses for the transportation of logs, sometimes using 24-horse teams. Up until then hand-logging with oxen was typical. From 1887-1889 a railway spur line for Royal City Planing Mills came into the Sunnyside area from the east, and from 1917-1920 a spur line came in from Crescent Beach. Skid roads were used to run logs down to the Serpentine, Nicomekl, and Campbell Rivers by horse team. By 1904 the best and most accessible timber was exhausted.

In May 1890 a post office opened, with J.A. Cartheau serving as postmaster. It closed in 1891, after the New Westminster and Southern Railway commenced operation, providing direct service to a series of stations along the line.

In 1964 the Surrey Bus Service operated out of a depot at 24th and King George Highway. This included local bus service as well as into Vancouver. In 1974 the company merged with BC Transit.

Though now mainly residential, Sunnyside has a growing retail and business sector. In the early 1980s the Semiahmoo Shopping Centre was opened on the north side of North Bluff Road at Johnson Road (16th Avenue and 152nd Street) and in 1990 a shopping centre was located at Peninsula Village on 24th Avenue. First-run movie theatre is at 24th and King George Boulevard.

=== Cemeteries ===
The City of Surrey owns and operates the Sunnyside Lawn Cemetery at 28th Avenue at the 14800 block.

== Churches / Worship ==
- Peace Portal Alliance Church
- Sunnyside United Church
- Life Church / White Rock Christian Fellowship
- Mt. Olive Lutheran Church
- Jehovah's Witness Kingdom Hall
- Gracepoint Community Church
- Star of the Sea Catholic Church
- St. Mark's Anglican Church
- The Church at Southpointe (Baptist, meets at Sunnyside United Church)
- White Rock / South Surrey Jewish Community Centre
- South Fraser Unitarian Congregation (meets at Sunnyside United Church)

== Schools ==
The first school was Elgin School located from 1921-1984 at 3530 144th Street. Sunnyside Elementary opened in 1949 at the corner of Johnson Road (152nd Street) and Oliver (near King George Highway). Jessie Lee Elementary opened in 1974. Present-day public schools are operated by School District 36 Surrey.

=== Present day schools ===
- Elgin Park Secondary School (1993)
- Semiahmoo Secondary School (1940)
- Earl Marriott Secondary School (1973)
- Grandview Heights Secondary School (2020)
- Southridge (private)
- White Rock Christian Academy
- Sunnyside Elementary (2013)
- {The 1949 Sunnyside Elementary was demolished and relocated. What now stands on the old site is a townhouse complex called “Old School”}
- Semiahmoo Trail Elementary (1996)
- Jessie Lee Elementary (1974)
- Chantrell Creek Elementary (1992)

== See also ==
- South Surrey
- Ocean Park
- Surrey
