= South Surrey Park and Ride =

Park and ride facility

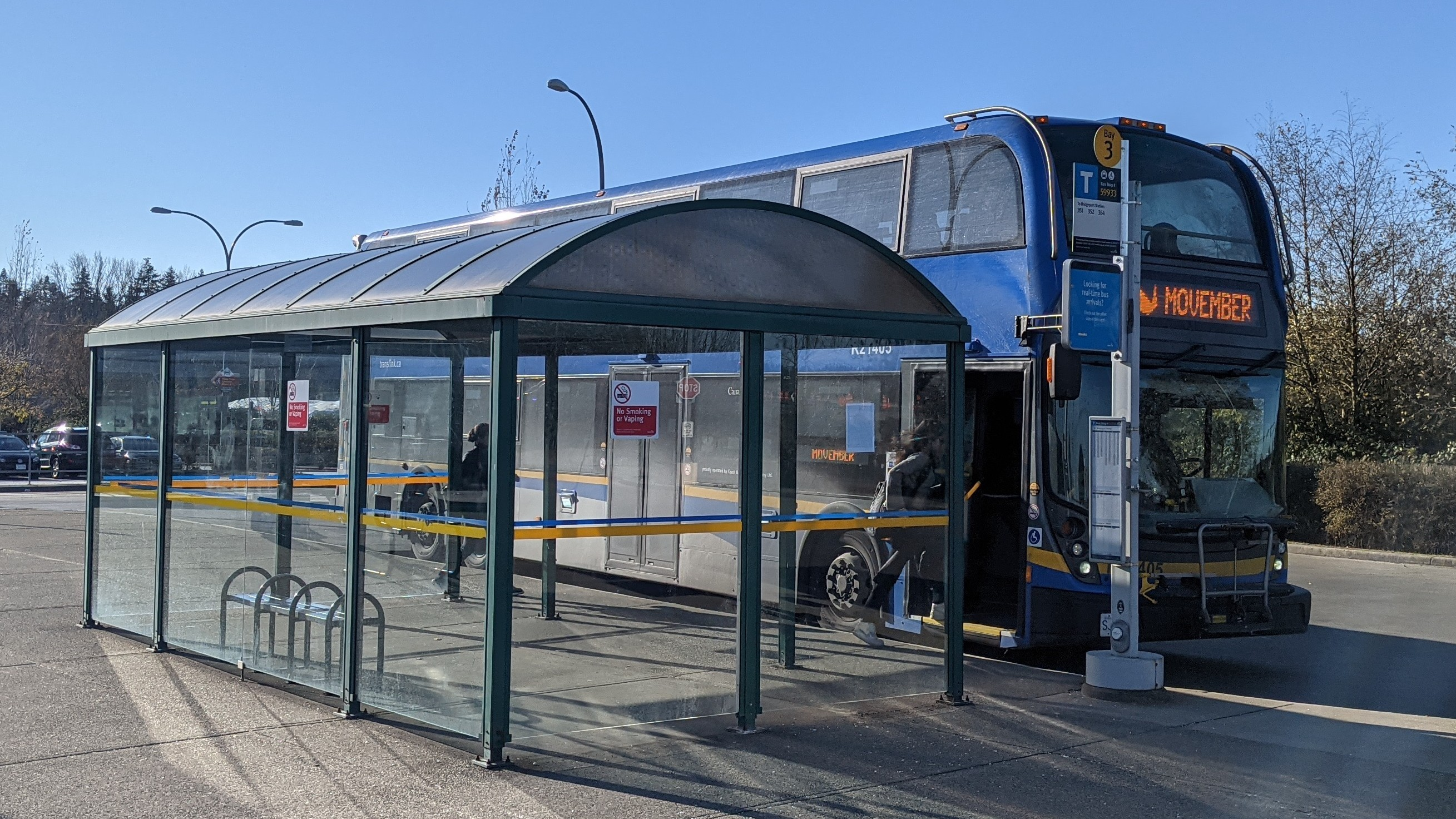
- 351 Bridgeport Station loading at Bay 3

General information
- Location: BC 99 & King George Boulevard; Surrey, British Columbia; Canada
- Coordinates: 49°04′20″N 122°49′21″W
- Owner: TransLink
- Bus routes: 5
- Bus stands: 4
- Bus operators: Coast Mountain Bus Company

Construction
- Parking: 840

Other information
- Fare zone: 3

History
- Opened: May 8, 1991; 35 years ago
- Rebuilt: 1999, 2006; 20 years ago
Location

The South Surrey Park and Ride is a bus loop and park and ride facility serving the South Surrey area. As part of the TransLink system, it is used by five routes serving South Surrey and White Rock, including towards Vancouver via Bridgeport station in Richmond as well as to Newton and Surrey City Centre.

== History ==
The first South Surrey Park and Ride opened on May 8, 1991, located at 152 Street and Cranley Drive (now mall access for Southpoint Exchange). On December 13, 1999, the park and ride was relocated so that the Southpoint Exchange mall could be constructed. The second site was located at 32 Avenue and 32 Avenue Diversion, a short distance from the original site. The third and current South Surrey park and ride facility was opened on June 26, 2006, adjacent to the Highway 99 and King George Boulevard interchange.

In November 2013, an expansion of 367 parking spots was opened, and a $2-per-day parking fee was introduced. In December 2020, a COVID-19 test centre opened at the park and ride.

== Routes ==
As of September 2020, the following routes serve the South Surrey Park and Ride:

Bay	Route	Destination	Notes
1	351	White Rock Centre	
1	352	Ocean Park	Weekday PM peak hours only
1	354	White Rock South	Weekday PM peak hours only
2	321	White Rock Centre; White Rock South	
2	394	White Rock Centre	Weekday peak hours only
3	351	Bridgeport Station	
3	352	Bridgeport Station	Weekday AM peak hours only
3	354	Bridgeport Station	Weekday AM peak hours only
4	321	Surrey Central Station	
4	394	King George Station	Weekday peak hours only

== See also ==
- List of bus routes in Metro Vancouver
