= Matthews Exchange =

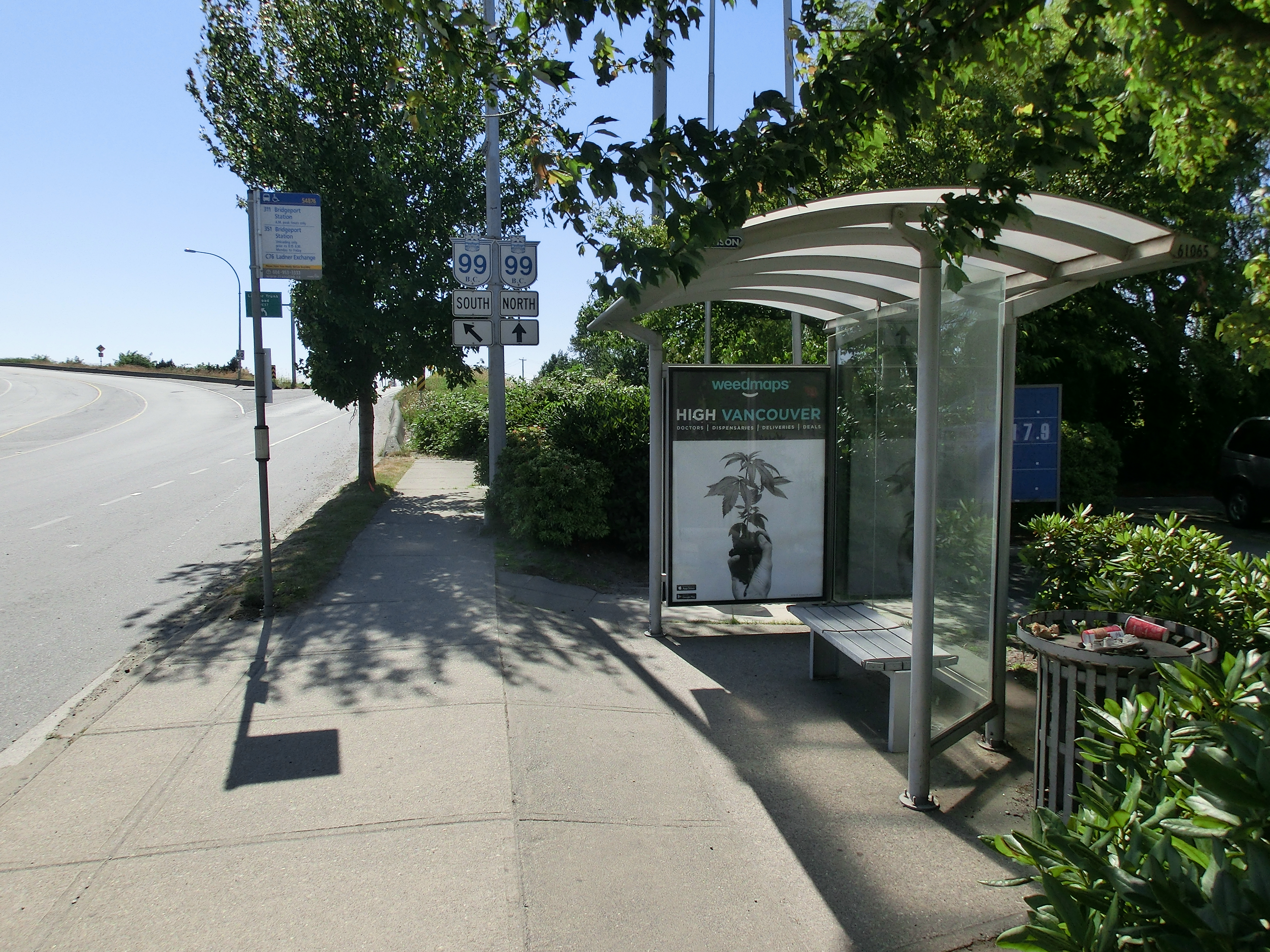

General information
- Location: Delta, British Columbia, Canada
- Coordinates: 49°5′25″N 122°57′34″W
- Operator: TransLink
- Bus routes: 3
- Bus stands: 4
- Bus operators: Coast Mountain Bus Company

Other information
- Fare zone: 3

History
- Opened: April 20, 1987
- Closed: September 7, 2020
Location

Matthews Exchange was a transit exchange located on Highway 99 at the Ladner Trunk Road interchange. Opened on April 20, 1987, the exchange was primarily served by the 351 to Richmond and South Surrey. On September 7, 2020, the exchange closed and its designation was dropped, but buses that used to serve this exchange continue to do so.

Stops 54876 and 54878 are located on the north side of Highway 99 while stops 54877 and 55179 are located on the south side.

== Routes ==
Stop Number	Route	Destination	Notes
54876	310	Ladner Exchange	
54876	311	Bridgeport Station	AM peak hours only
54876	351	Bridgeport Station	
54877	310	Scottsdale	
54877	311	Scottsdale	PM peak hours only
54877	351	White Rock Centre	
54878	310	Scottsdale	
54878	311	Scottsdale	PM peak hours only
55179	310	Ladner Exchange	

== See also ==
- List of bus routes in Metro Vancouver
