= Crescent Beach, Surrey =

Crescent Beach
- Neighbourhood of Surrey
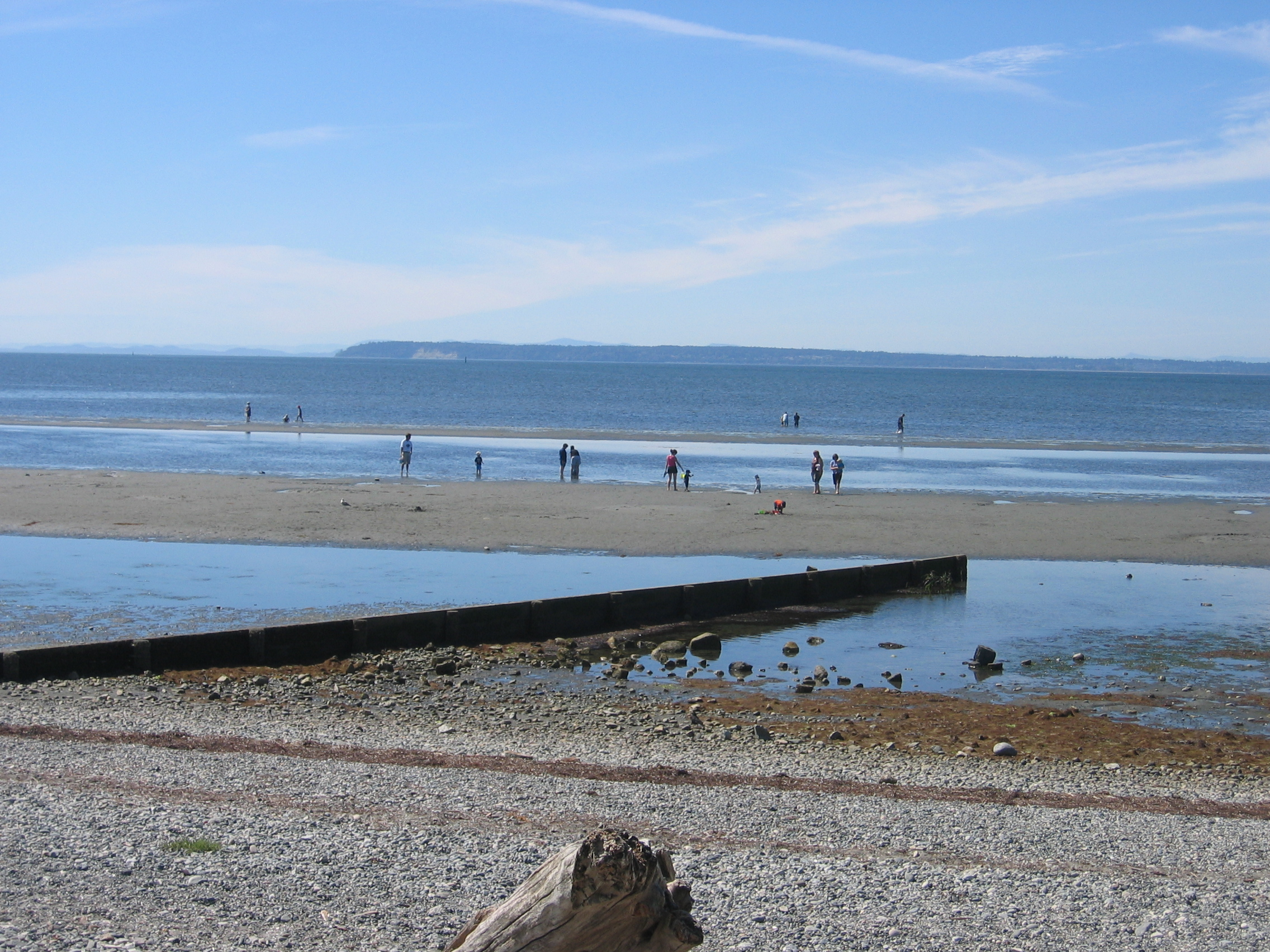
- A groyne at Crescent Beach

- Location within Metro Vancouver
- Coordinates: 49°03′08″N 122°53′02″W
- Country: Canada
- Province: British Columbia
- Region: Lower Mainland
- Regional district: Metro Vancouver
- City: Surrey

Government
  - Mayor: Brenda Locke
  - MP (Fed.): Kerry-Lynne Findlay (Conservative)
  - MLA (Prov.): Elenore Sturko (Independent)

Population (2014)
  - Total: 1,200
- Time zone: UTC−8 (PST)
  - Summer (DST): UTC−7 (PDT)

Crescent Beach is a beachside community within the South Surrey town centre of Surrey, British Columbia, Canada next to Boundary Bay and Mud Bay, across from Delta, British Columbia. It is home to 1,200 residents, mostly in single-family homes.

== History ==
Crescent Beach has been a summer destination for centuries. In pre-colonial times, it was the location of a significant temporary summer camp for area aboriginals. The tidal mudflats were a good clam digging area. Wild berries, especially cranberries, and a weir site were located at nearby Nicomekl River and Serpentine River areas. The area was part of Snokomish territory until a smallpox epidemic in 1850 forced the survivors and their lands to be amalgamated into the Semiahmoo First Nation. Musqueam bands also travelled to use the lands seasonally.

Artifacts such as arrowheads and jade have been found on the beach in the modern era. First Nations' burial sites were uncovered in 1970 by sewer excavation.

The Semiahmoo First Nation attributes three to five metres depth of the land base to archaeological deposits of clams, charcoal and fire-cracked rocks without which the area would largely just be a sandspit. Modern excavations in some parts have also uncovered more than 700 human remains.

The first Europeans to chart the area were Spanish sailors. Captain Galiano titled it San Rafael Point on his map.

After the creation of British Columbia, the first owner of Crescent Beach area was John Musselwaite of Royal Engineers in 1871.

In 1909, the development of the Great Northern Railway from Blaine, Washington to New Westminster provided easier access to the beach for Vancouver-area residents. In 1913, permanent dikes (now serving as the waterfront walkway) were established to permit subdivision development. 1912 saw a development of pier and the Crescent Beach Development Company promoted Crescent Beach as a resort area. Notable Vancouverites began building summer homes in the neighbourhood. That year, Captain Watkin Williams also opened the Crescent Beach Hotel, a 21-room building with a restaurant, store and post office. The hotel burned down in February 1950.

Oyster imported from Japan seeded a thriving business for some decades until the Crescent Oyster Company was closed in 1961 due to river pollution and contemporary concerns about shellfish paralytic poisoning.

== Recreation ==
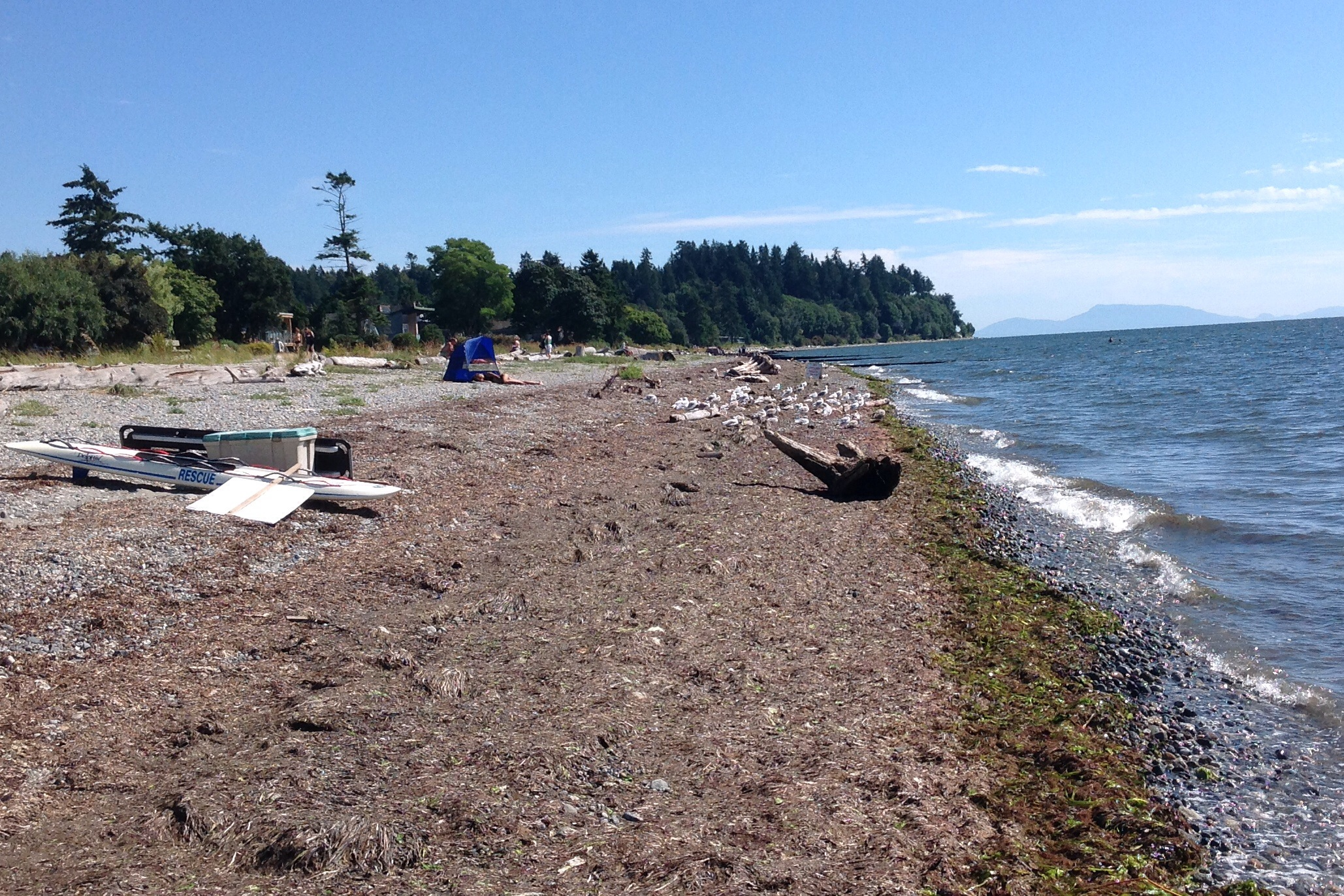
South-facing view of Crescent Beach at high tide

Crescent Beach is home to Alexandra Neighbourhood House, the Wickson Pier and Blackie Spit Park, all local landmarks. Crescent Beach is the home of the "Crescent Beach Swim Club", a local club that offers swimming, sailing, tennis, water polo, volleyball, and triathlon lessons to children.

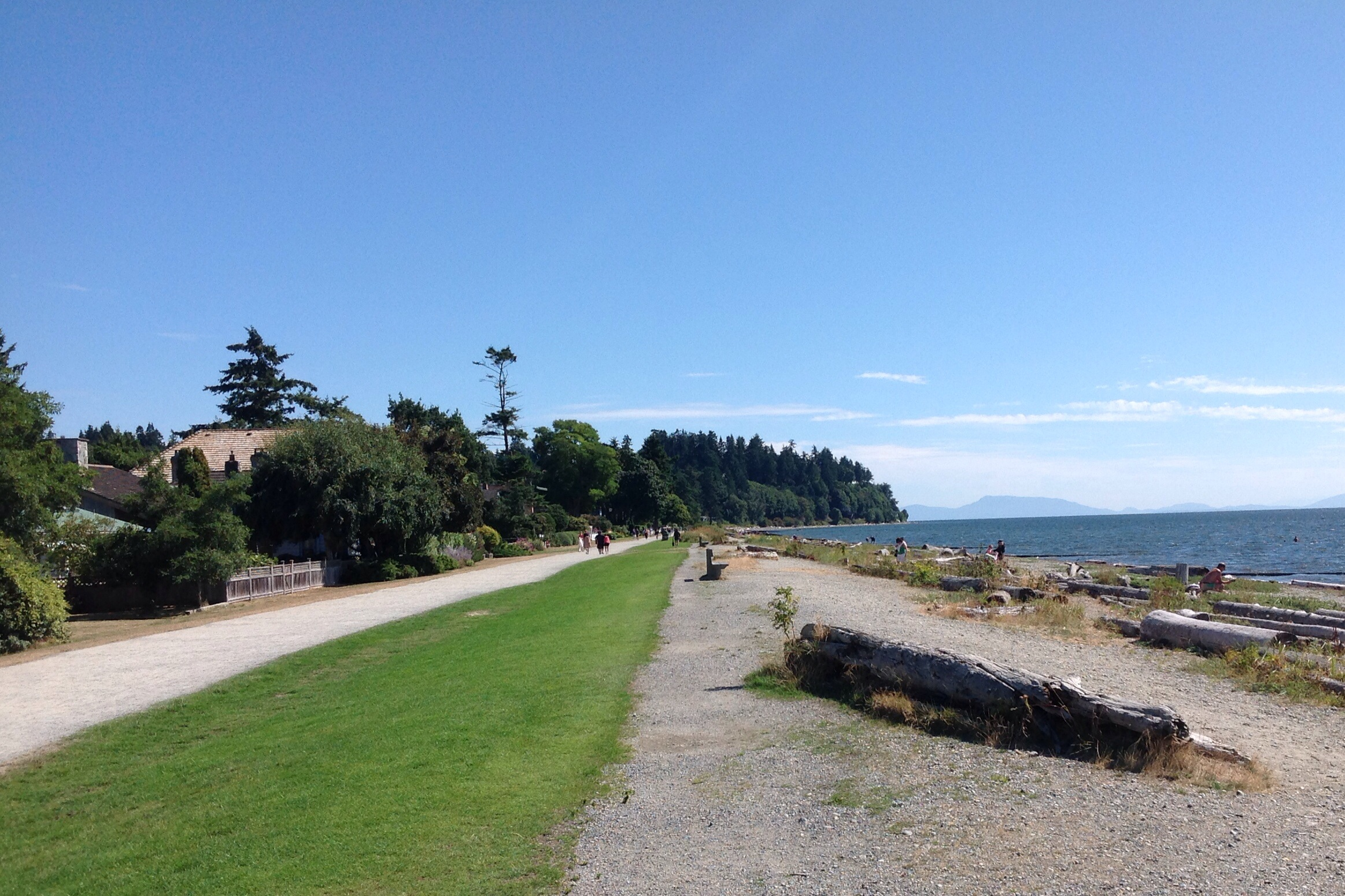
South-facing view of beach and walkway in Crescent Beach in Surrey, British Columbia

On the southern end of Crescent Beach near the bottom of 101 steps staircase at 24 Avenue is the 120 tonne Crescent Rock boulder. Crescent Rock Beach is the 6.5 km. long rugged strip of shoreline from this large rock to White Rock at the base of the Ocean Park bluffs that is utilized by naturists and nudists for nude sunbathing and skinny-dipping. The City of Surrey refuses to endorse its clothing-optional use as it is outside their jurisdiction but the RCMP have acknowledged that nude use on this area out of sight from the marine parks at Crescent Beach and White Rock is legal under Canadian case law.

The beach area has showers to wash feet and legs to prevent swimmer's itch, a short-term immune reaction caused by waterborne parasites seeking freshwater snails.

=== Blackie Spit birdwatching ===
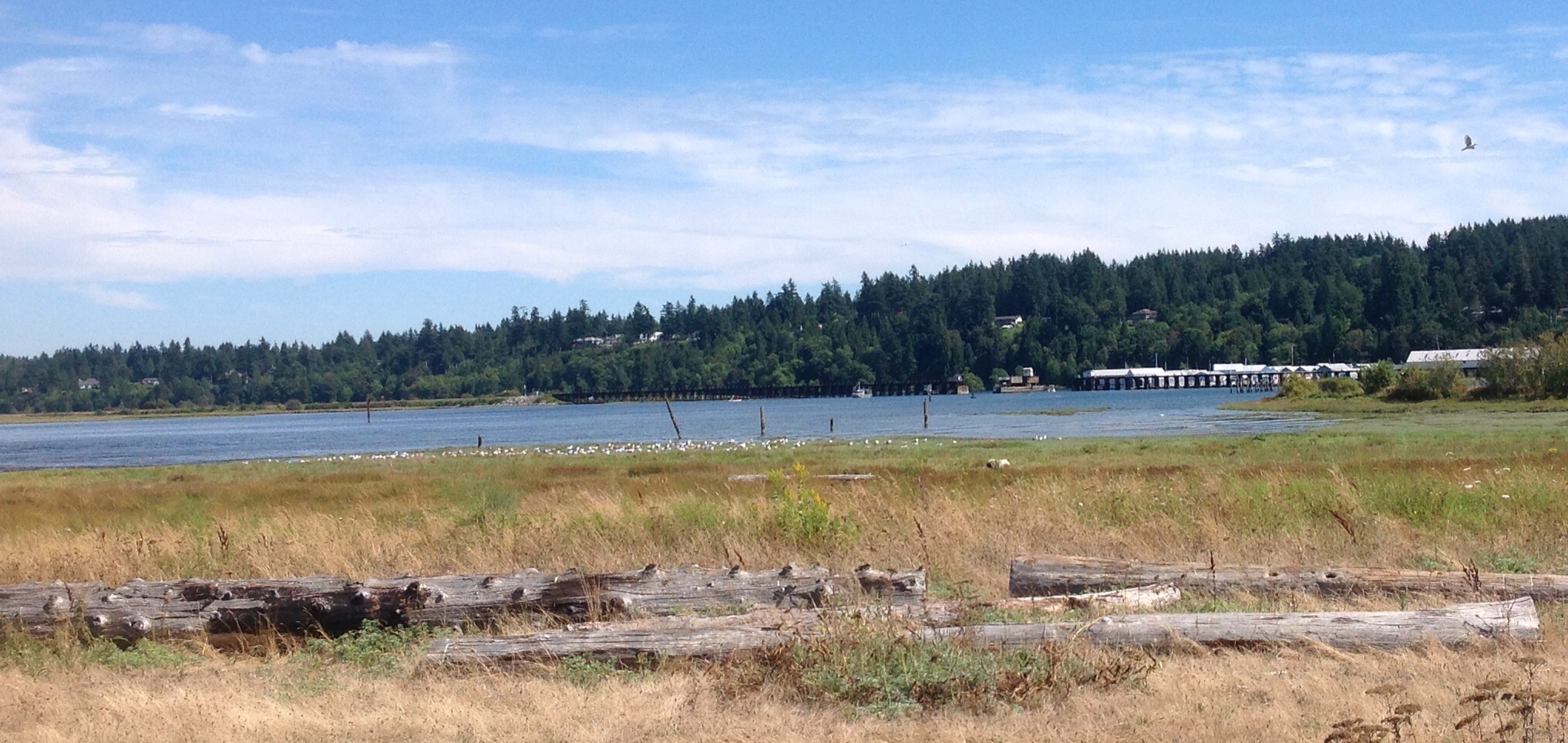
Northeast-facing view of Mud Bay from Blackie Spit

The northernmost portion of Crescent Beach is Blackie Spit, named after a settler and known as a birdwatching site beside Mud Bay and near Nicomekl River. The City of Surrey created Blackie Spit Park in 1996.

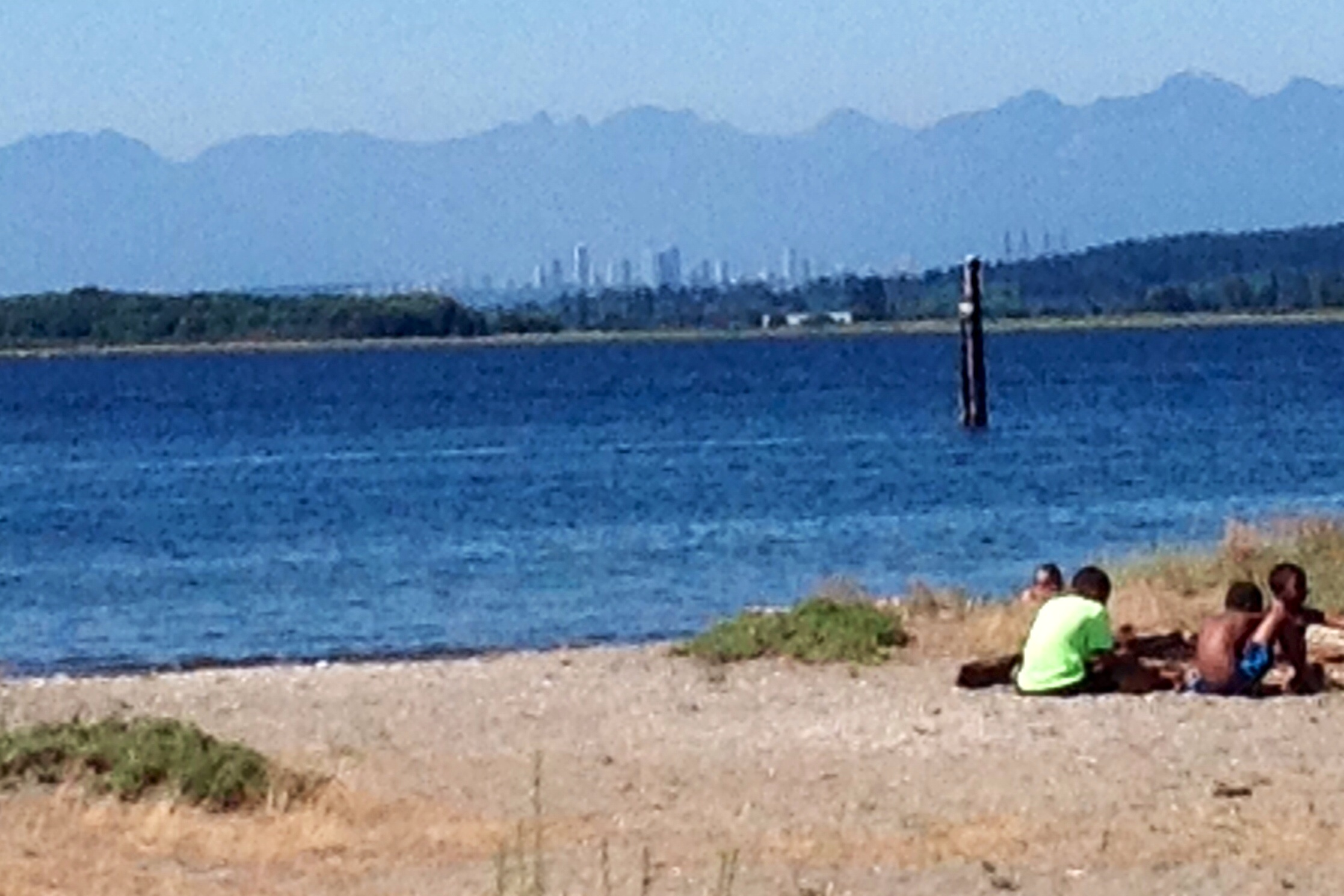
North-facing view of Mud Bay at high tide from Blackie Spit. Skyscrapers in Burnaby and the North Shore Mountains visible in distant background

The park is an annual migration rest stop for the Pacific Flyway for 300 species of birds including 10,000 ducks and geese. It is the only area in Boundary Bay where purple martins nest. The eelgrass meadows, mud flats and tidal marsh serve as bird habitats year-round. Shorebirds feed off biofilms, a paper-thin mucus, that consist of bacteria, diatoms (microscopic plants) and organic detritus.

== Transportation ==
Crescent Beach has two accesses by road to the rest of Surrey (Crescent Road and McBride Avenue) which both cross the BNSF Railway. Implications for emergency access and the impact of noise and coal dust from the trains are long-time concerns for residents. From 2002 to 2014, the number of trains quadrupled from five to 20 a day.

Public transportation is provided by TransLink bus route 350. The commuter bus service connects Crescent Beach to White Rock Centre.

The 4.5 kilometres (2.8 mi) Crescent Road corridor connects the beach area to King George Boulevard near Nicomekl River. The road is registered with the city and national historic place registries because it enabled transport to pioneer locations (such as Historic Stewart Farm) due to its first construction in 1882 shortly after incorporation of the City of Surrey.

Beecher Street, known as the Marine Drive of Crescent Beach, is home to bistros, ice cream cafes and small stores.

Boats are also stored at Crescent Beach Marina at the tip of Nicomekl River.

== Arts & culture ==
A 2008 teen novel Reading the Bones by Gina McMurchy-Barber featured 12-year-old heroine Peggy Henderson uncovering an archaeological skull in her uncle's backyard in Crescent Beach.

Scenes from the 2010 film Tron: Legacy were filmed along the waterfront at Crescent Beach, with one of the houses there functioning as the home of Kevin and Sam Flynn.

In 2012, Beach House Theatre began annual production of Shakespeare plays in August in open-ended tents similar to Vancouver's Bard on the Beach festival. In 2015, Beach House Theatre began performing plays outside of Shakespeare, starting with Oscar Wilde's The Importance of Being Earnest.

A season two episode of Better Things was filmed at Crescent Beach in June 2017 near the main swimming area.

== See also ==
- Ocean Park (Surrey)
- Sunnyside (Surrey)
- White Rock, British Columbia
