= Southridge School =

- Southridge School Crest

Location
- 2656 160 Street; Surrey, British Columbia, V3Z 0B7; Canada

Information
- School type: Private
- Motto: Omnis Anima Volet (Let Every Spirit Soar)
- Religious affiliation: Non-denominational
- Founded: 1995 (30 years ago)
- Founder: Alan Brown
- Head of School: Drew Stephens
- Senior School Principal: Laura Holland
- Junior School Principal: Tanya de Hoog
- Grades: K-12
- Enrollment: 675
- Campus size: Three buildings and 4 fields on 17 acres
- Houses: Blizzard, Hurricane, Lightning, Thunder
- Colours: Blue, White, Gold
- Athletics: Soccer, Rugby, Basketball, Badminton, Track and Field, Golf, Ultimate Frisbee, Cross Country
- Mascot: Sal (part eagle, part orca)
- Team name: Storm
- Website: www.southridge.ca
- Last updated: 25 September 2025

Southridge School is a K-12 independent school in South Surrey, British Columbia, Canada. It is a regional school, serving from as far away as Richmond and Ladner, though most students are from the White Rock, South Surrey area.

== Facilities ==
The school has two permanent buildings (Junior School building and Senior School building), two gymnasiums, two libraries, one computer lab, multiple science labs, an auditorium and four athletic fields (including one FieldTurf field). An "Annex" building is situated near the Senior School building, used for administrative purposes and to house the school's uniform shop.

== Academics ==
Southridge School follows the International Baccalaureate curriculum in the Junior school, through the Primary Years and Middle Years programs. In the Senior School, Southridge follows the standard British Columbia grades 8–12 curriculum, including: English, Physics, Chemistry and Biology (taught with British Columbia standards), AP courses in these fields, as well as History, Literature and Calculus. Uniquely, the Southridge Senior School implements the Harkness model of education, which emphasizes discussion based learning and dialogue during class, and is the only school in Canada to fully implement the Harkness philosophy across an entire Senior School curriculum. Southridge was ranked by the Fraser Institute in 2018–2019 as #1 out of 252 British Columbian Secondary Schools.

== Sports ==
Southridge is classified as a 'Single A' sized school, but most often plays in "AA" or "AAA" leagues. In 2014 and 2015 respectively, the Senior Boy 'AA' Basketball team won the Fraser Valley Championship. This was followed by a Senior Boy 'AAA' Provincial Championship win in 2016.

== Arts ==
In 2025, Southridge School's Gr. 10–12 Theatre Company class devised their own show titled "The Yellow Suitcase", receiving a standing ovation from audiences, winning multiple awards and will be featured in the story exhibit at the Canadian Museum of Immigration at Pier 21.

== Extracurricular activities ==
Amongst other activities, the school offers Reach For the Top, Model UN, and VEX Robotics as extracurricular activities.
