= South Surrey =

- Town centre of Surrey
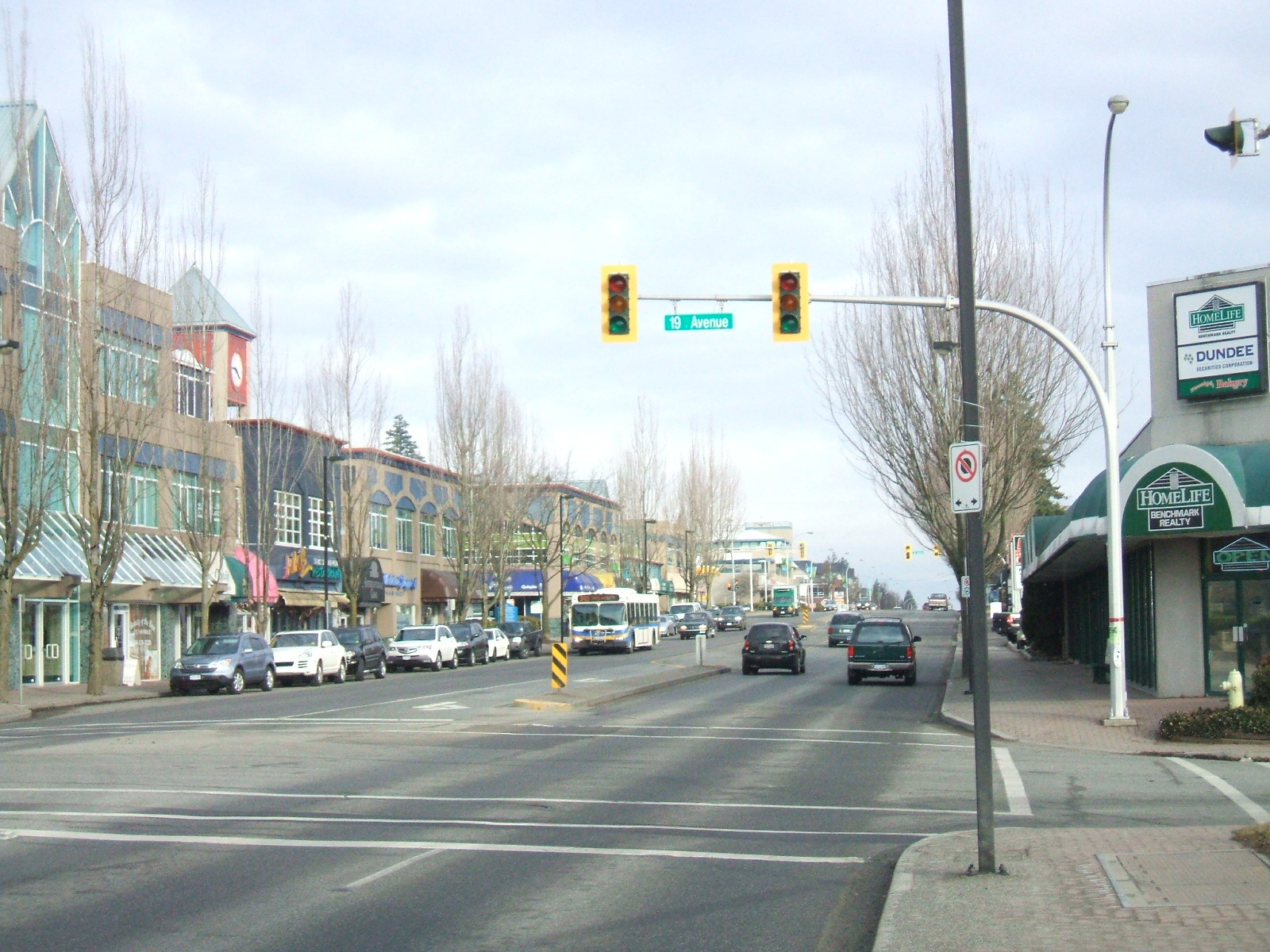
- 152 Street in Uptown South Surrey

- Location of South Surrey within Metro Vancouver
- Coordinates: 49.0455°N 122.7792°W
- Country: Canada
- Province: British Columbia
- Region: Lower Mainland
- Regional district: Metro Vancouver
- City: Surrey

Government
  - Mayor: Brenda Locke
  - MP (fed.): Ernie Klassen (Liberal)
  - MLA (prov.): Stephanie Cadieux (Liberal); Tracy Redies (Liberal)

Population (2016)
  - Total: 77,170
- Time zone: UTC−08:00 (PST)
  - Summer (DST): UTC−07:00 (PDT)

South Surrey is a community within the City of Surrey, British Columbia, located on the Semiahmoo peninsula in the southern portion of the City of Surrey, sharing a border with the City of White Rock. Neighbourhoods of South Surrey include Crescent Beach, Crescent Heights, Elgin, Chantrell Creek, Morgan Creek, Grandview Heights, Hazelmere, Ocean Park, and Sunnyside. Most of South Surrey lies in White Rock's population centre.

== Demographics ==
At the time of the 2016 census, the total population of South Surrey was 77,170.

South Surrey has a senior population of 25,655, the largest concentration of citizens over the age of sixty in Surrey. It is also greater than any of Surrey's other town centres.

Ethnic groups in South Surrey (2016)		%
Ethnic group	European	72%
Ethnic group	Chinese	15%
Ethnic group	South Asian	6%
Ethnic group	Indigenous	2%
Ethnic group	Korean	2%
Ethnic group	Other	3%
Total %		100%

Languages spoken in South Surrey (2016)		%
Language	English	84%
Language	Mandarin	10%
Language	Punjabi	1%
Language	Cantonese	1%
Language	Korean	1%
Language	Other	3%
Total %		100%

== Education ==
Four public secondary schools serve the South Surrey town centre: Semiahmoo Secondary School, Earl Marriott Secondary School, Elgin Park Secondary School, and Grandview Heights Secondary School. Two private schools – White Rock Christian Academy and Southridge School – also serve the region.

== Transportation ==
Highways in South Surrey include Highway 99, Highway 15, Route 10, King George Boulevard.

Two major public transit exchanges serve South Surrey town centre, the South Surrey Park and Ride and White Rock Centre, the latter partially located within the city of White Rock. Bus routes in the region feed into Bridgeport SkyTrain station in Richmond, and King George and Surrey Central stations in Surrey's City Centre.

== Sports and recreation ==
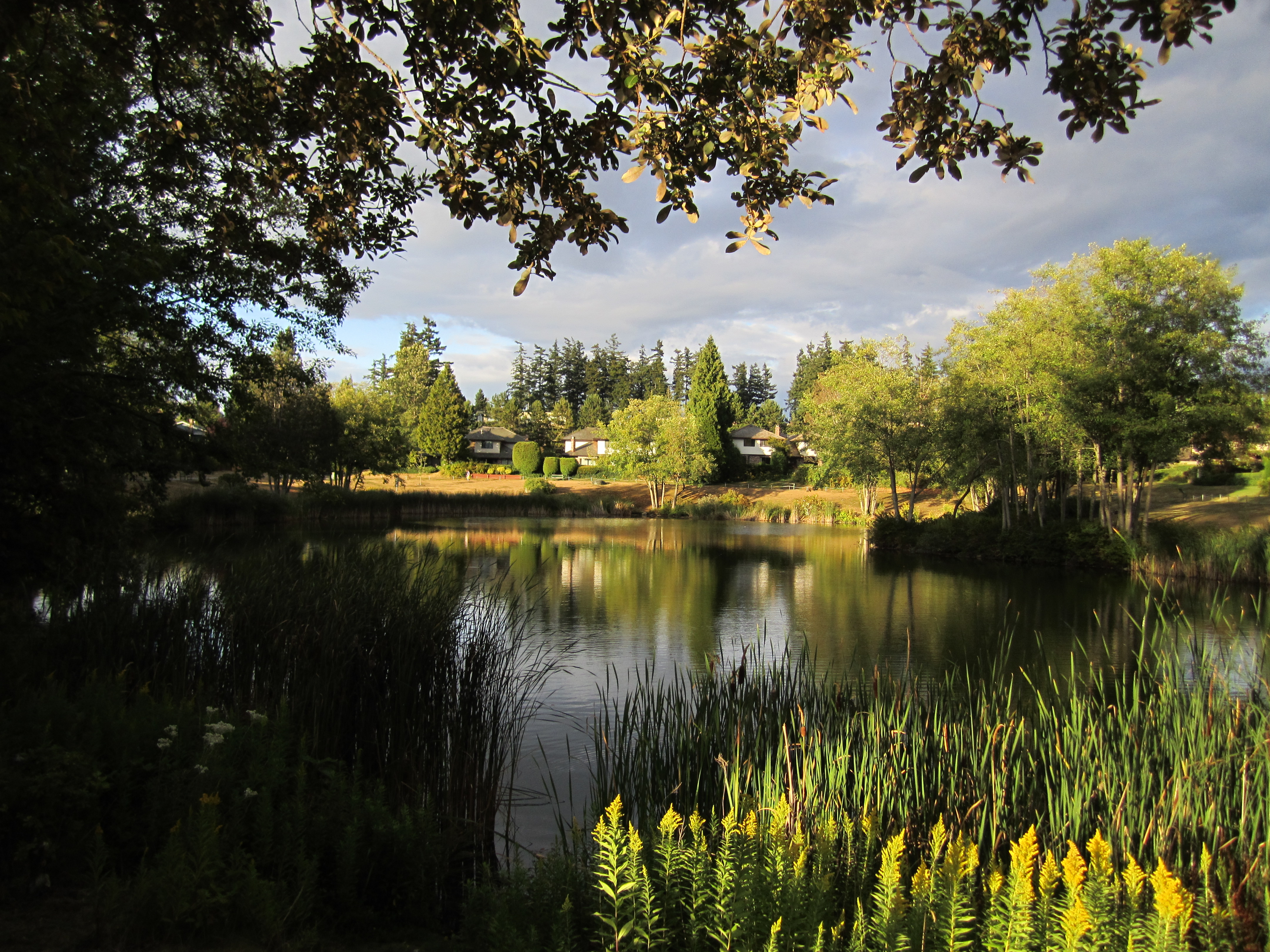
A pond located west of Semiahmoo Shopping Centre

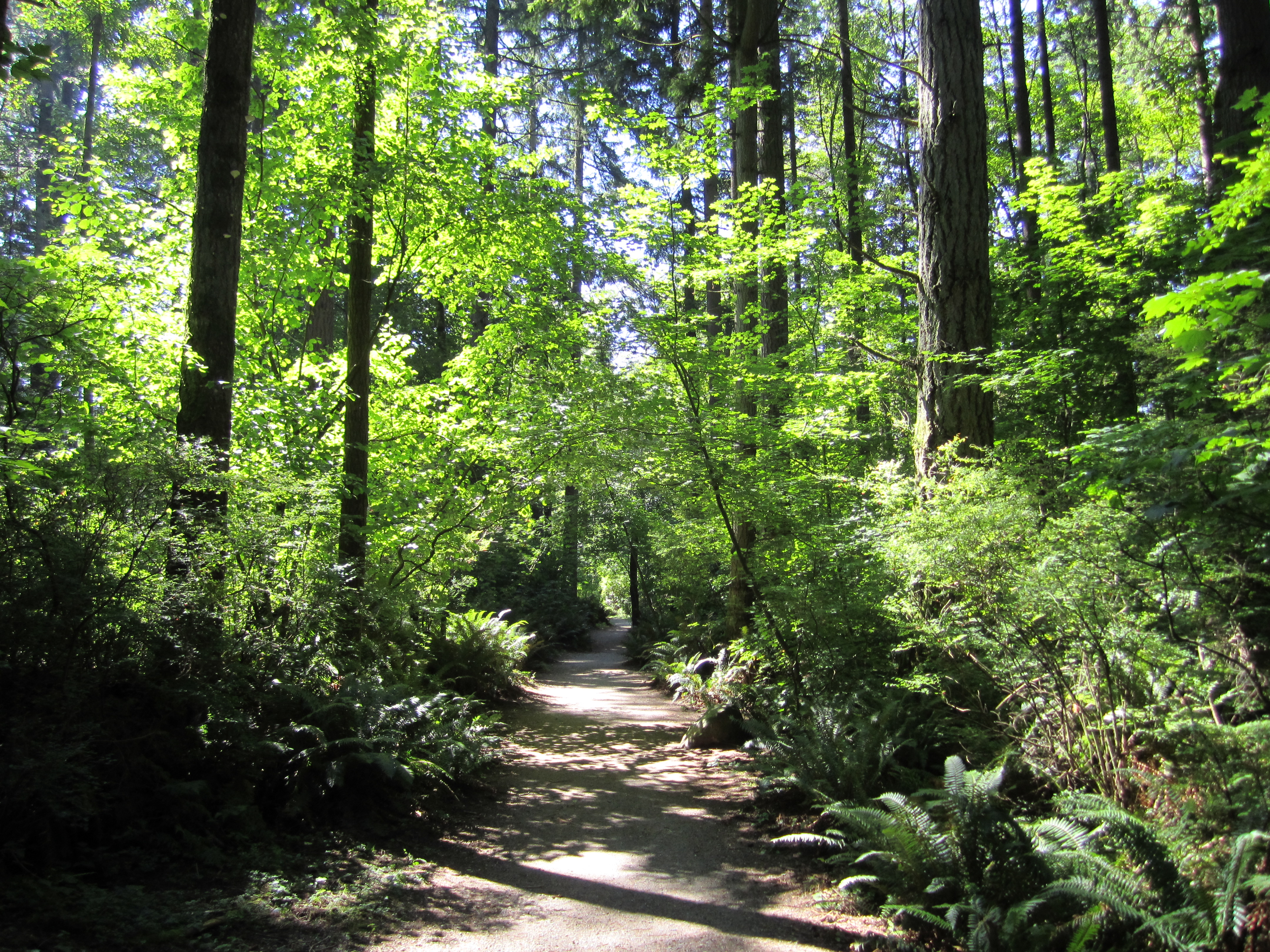
Sunnyside Acres is a large urban forest in the region.

South Surrey is home to the Surrey Eagles, a hockey team that plays in the BCHL. The Eagles play their home games at the South Surrey Athletic Park, where the South Surrey Arena is located. Scott Gomez, a former Eagle who has accrued over 700 career NHL points, enjoyed a highly productive campaign with the Surrey Eagles over the 1996–97 season.

Softball City, a major softball sporting complex is also located at the South Surrey Athletic Park.
