= Grandview Heights, Surrey =

Grandview Heights
- Neighbourhood of Surrey
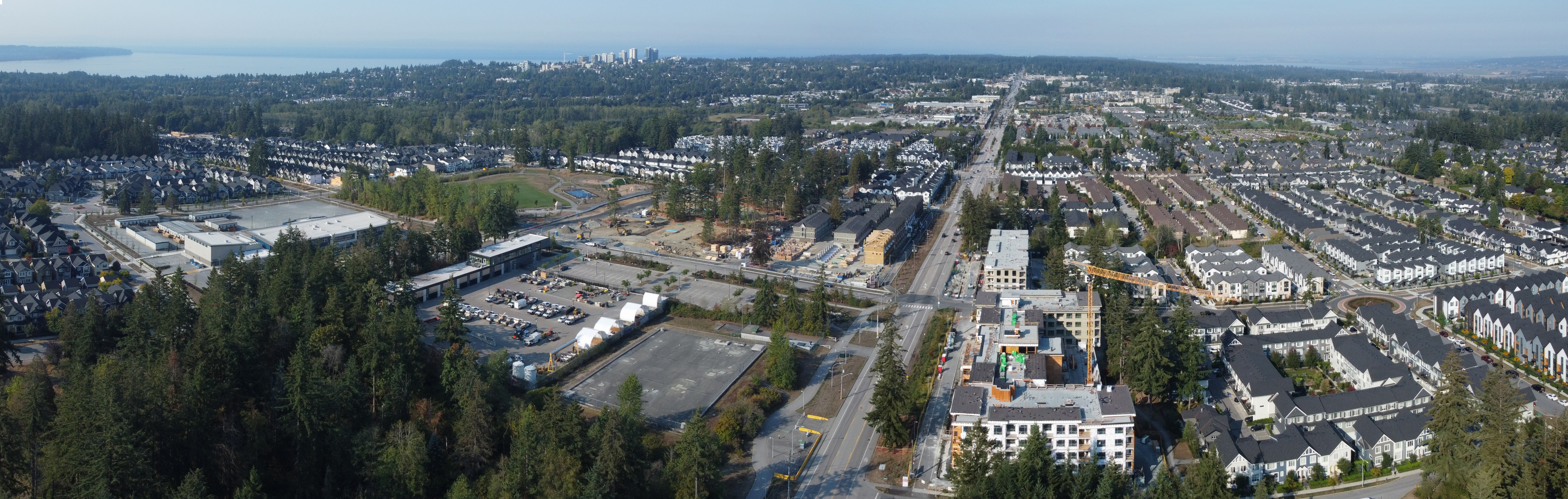
- Aerial view of Grandview Heights

- Location of Grandview Heights within Metro Vancouver
- Coordinates: 49.0457°N 122.7570°W
- Country: Canada
- Province: British Columbia
- Region: Lower Mainland
- Regional district: Metro Vancouver
- City: Surrey
- Town centre: South Surrey

Government
  - Mayor: Brenda Locke
  - MP (Fed.): Kerry-Lynne Findlay (Conservative)
  - MLA (Prov.): Elenore Sturko (United)
- Time zone: UTC−8 (PST)
  - Summer (DST): UTC−7 (PDT)

Grandview Heights is a neighbourhood in the South Surrey town centre of Surrey, British Columbia, Canada.

== History ==
Grandview Heights was first settled in 1878 by David Brown, who homesteaded near the present day intersection of Highway 15 and 16 Avenue. Grandview Heights remained a sparsely populated logging community until the completion of the Pacific Highway (Highway 15) in 1923.

The neighbourhood name originates from the former Grandview Heights Elementary School, located at Highway 15 and 20 Avenue. In 1922, Alex McBeth, who was shingling the roof for the school was able to see Semiahmoo Bay and Blaine, Washington from atop, he remarked "What a grand view".

In Spring 2005, the city of Surrey began the process of rezoning much of the western portion of the neighbourhood from rural farms and large estates into commercial retail and medium-density housing. Most of the commercial retail development began in the late 2000s (decade) and was completed in the early 2010s. The neighbourhood continues to expand east along 24 Avenue with residential homes.

On June 11, 2016, the city of Surrey opened the Grandview Heights Aquatic Centre at the intersection of 24 Avenue and 168 Street. The city opened Grandview Heights Secondary School in September 2021, which is adjacent to the aquatic centre. The school is the fourth secondary school in South Surrey and the first high school to have been built in the South Surrey area since 1993 when Elgin Park was opened.

== Transportation ==
Public transit service in Grandview Heights commenced on April 23, 2012 with the 531 bus route running along 24 Avenue with service to White Rock Centre and Willowbrook. The 363 (Southpoint/Peace Arch Hospital) and 354 (White Rock South/Bridgeport Station) bus routes also serve the neighbourhood running along 160 Street, the latter only operating as an express service during peak hours on the weekdays to Bridgeport station.
