= Arnold Mikelson =

Latvian artist (1922–1984)

Arnold Mikelson (1922–1984) was a Latvian artist who specialized in wood carvings. Starting in 1947, he was chief designer for Royal Crown Derby Porcelain of England, before working as an architectural draftsman for a number of years. In the late 1960s, he took up carving full-time. Mikelson's work includes the design of the Mind and Matter Gallery in White Rock, British Columbia. He had commissions from the forestry giant MacMillan Bloedel (now Weyerhaeuser Canada), the Province of British Columbia and the City of Surrey.

== Early life ==
Mikelson was born in 1922 in the small river town of Rauna, Latvia. He was the son of a cabinetmaker. At the age of four, a visiting aunt noticed him carving a piece of wood on his father’s workbench. From then until the age of 16, he studied various artistic crafts. Trained as a mechanical engineer, he retained his passion for art. At the age of 17, Mikelson was awarded a Gold Medal in the Latvian seaport capital of Riga for his contribution to the arts there.

== Career ==
Mikelson gave up painting at the age of 28 and settled on sculpture almost exclusively. In 1940, during World War II, the Russians invaded Latvia. Mikelson fled to Germany. Over seven years in war-torn Germany, Mikelson managed around 40 employees. These were artisans who made wooden hope chests, jewelry boxes, wooden plates and chandeliers. Mikelson created intricate carvings. Many churches throughout Germany contain carved chandeliers crafted by him.

=== England ===
In 1947, after the war, Mikelson emigrated to England. Mikelson began working at the 200-year-old Royal Crown Derby Porcelain of England, hired to create three-dimensional sculptures. Mikelson was the company’s Chief Designer. His design leadership, including the "Chelsea Birds" now well known, helped revitalize and rebuild Royal Crown to some of its former grandeur. His work, consisting largely of bird sculptures, remains on display in the Royal Crown Derby Museum in England. In 1948 Arnold married Livija Mikkelson in Repton, United Kingdom. In 1953 Arnold, Livija, and their two young children sailed for Canada.

=== Canada ===
On a 1954 visit overseas, Canadian Senator Donald Cameron, appointed to the government after a significant career in public education with the University of Alberta, encountered Mikelson’s work at an art exhibition in England. Cameron, among his many significant achievements, was head of the Banff School of Fine Arts in the 1930s, and maintained a leadership connection with that facility over the years. He acted as its head during his time as a Senator, and he kept that position until 1969. The Banff School was world-famous even in 1954, and Cameron didn’t hesitate when he approached Mikelson and offered him a management and teaching position in the facility that sits in the Tunnel Mountain in Banff National Park.

Mikelson accepted Senator Cameron’s offer and immigrated to Canada. However, when he travelled to Banff and saw the school, the finest in Canada with an international reputation, Mikelson turned down the opportunity, as the Banff facility was considered by European standards to be tiny and insignificant. Mikelson had no way of knowing at that time that this was the best that the comparatively new country of Canada had to offer, and he came, over time, to regret the decision he had made when he walked away from Senator Cameron’s offer.

Mikelson went to work as an architectural draftsman. He designed many schools, hospitals, and residential buildings throughout that province and British Columbia. In 1956, he carved moulds of the Canadian coat of arms for use in Alberta courtrooms.

After 11 years on the Prairies, Mikelson decided to leave Alberta for British Columbia, with his new wife Mary. In 1965 they settled in the Lower Mainland of British Columbia, where Arnold designed and built The Mind and Matter Gallery.

=== Late career ===
In 1971 the Amy Ryan Fine Arts Center in Abilene, Texas, commissioned Mikelson to create three sculptures for its Fine Arts Center. "Roadrunner", a roadrunner attacking a rattlesnake was one of the pieces, depicting the state bird of New Mexico. The "Mockingbirds", the state bird of Texas, along with "Inspiration", a seven-foot angel completed the set. Today these works are on permanent display at the Amy Graves Ryan Center of Fine Arts in Abilene.

Exhibitions featuring his work were held at the British Columbia Provincial Museum, and at locations all across Canada. In 1976 on the grounds of the Canadian National Exhibition in Toronto, he was invited to participate by the International Carvers Association with 1,500 entrants from all over the world. Mikelson’s work won in 11 out of 15 categories, he was given the Gold and Silver Medals for his accomplishment, and he was invited back the next year as a judge for the International Carvers Exhibition.

Mikelson died February 9, 1984, while recovering from open-heart surgery.

== Materials and technique ==
Mikelson favourite wood was satin walnut (eucalyptus), but he employed many other types, such as oak, teak, birch, and yellow cedar. After designing the sculpture, he roughly formed it with a bandsaw, laminated the parts, and then finished with a grinder, sandpaper, and varnish. For larger sculptures he worked on the components prior to gluing them together without clamps. He produced about 250 pieces each year.

== Family ==
Mikelson and his wife Mary had four children together; daughters Margit, Sapphire and Myra, and son Arnold Jr.
