= White Rock Christian Academy =

Coordinates: 49.04327°N 122.80122°W

- South Surrey, British Columbia; Canada

Information
- School type: Private School
- Religious affiliation: Christian
- Established: 1981
- Head of school: Joel Slofstra
- Grades: JK-12
- Enrollment: 600+
- Team name: Warriors
- Website: www.wrca.ca

White Rock Christian Academy (WRCA) is a Pre-K to Grade 12 Christian private school in South Surrey, British Columbia, Canada. WRCA states its core purpose is to "inspire and cultivate citizens of Godly character who transformed their world for Christ".

== History ==
White Rock Christian Academy opened its gates in November 1981 using Accelerated Christian Education (ACE) as its core curriculum. In September 1991 the curriculum was changed from ACE to a B.C.-approved curriculum taught from a distinctly Christian perspective. WRCA has developed over the years into a Ministry of Education-certified institute with a quickly growing enrollment of international students from Preschool all the way to Grade 12. As of September 2020, enrollment is over 569 students with over 66 faculty members and support staff. The Junior school has two and a half classes per class, ranging from 18 to 24 students per class. Today, the school offers the International Baccalaureate program for all students.

== Facilities ==
The school has three main buildings, including Preschool to Grade 12, a gravel field, gymnasium, the art room, music rooms, science labs and administrative offices. Currently the campus is undergoing redevelopment funded by private donations, largely from parents and financing from a Canadian Bank.

== Programs ==
Academics

WRCA currently offers the International Baccalaureate continuum program, through Primary Years (PYP), Middle Years (MYP) and Diploma (DP) Programmes. Every course is taught from a biblical Christian worldview.

Arts

The school arts program includes visual art, band, choir and musical theater. Every student is required to learn an instrument and participate in a school concert twice a year.

Athletics

Competing against larger schools, WRCA athletes have won several Fraser Valley and Provincial Championships in Basketball, Volleyball and Track and Field. The boys basketball program has produced 5-time Senior Provincial Champions, 6-time Senior Fraser Valley Champions, 12-time Surrey RCMP Tournament Champions, Junior Provincial Champions, and 2-time Junior Fraser Valley Champions. The girls volleyball program has produced 5-time Senior Provincial Champions, 12-time Senior Fraser Valley Champions, and Grade 8 Surrey Champions. In 2016, the WRCA Senior Girls Volleyball team won the 'A' Provincial Championship.

The Cross country program has produced 6-time Fraser Valley Champions and 2 BCCSSAA Championship wins, one in 2013 and another more recently in 2022. The Track and Field program have produced 10-time Individual Provincial Champions, 2014 and 2022 Surrey Champions and 2022 South Frasers Champions.

Mission and Service Learning

WRCA service and mission program encourages serving through local and global mission projects. The program follows an outline of seeing (grades JK–2), caring (grades 3–5), knowing (grades 6–10) and going (grades 11–12). Students over the years begin locally and then out on mission trips to countries around the world.

== Extracurricular ==
WRCA has a number of extracurricular opportunities (some integrated into the school curriculum) that students are encouraged to participate in.
