= Elgin Park Secondary School =

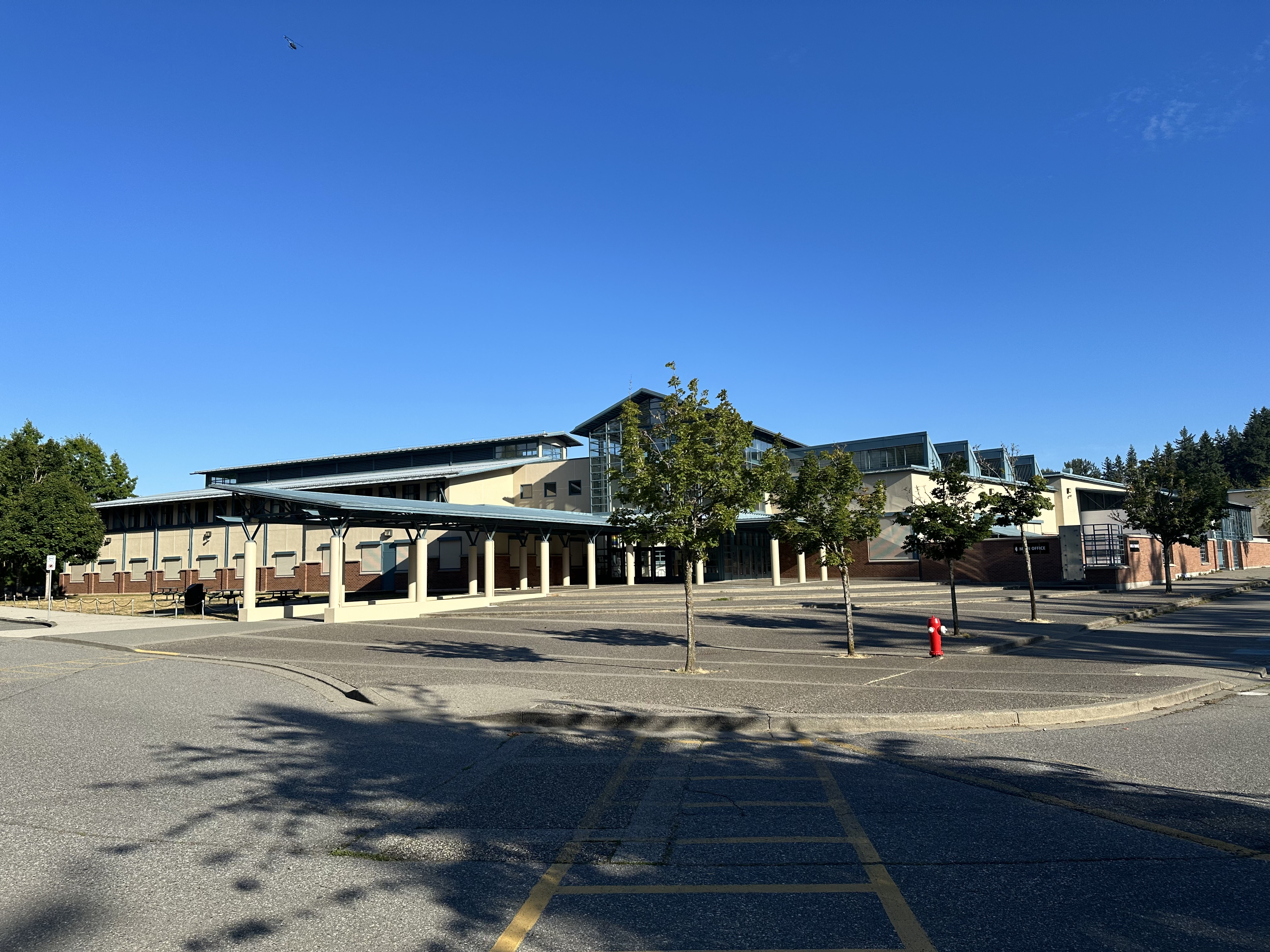
- Secondary School

Location
- 13484 24th Ave; Surrey, British Columbia, V4A 2G5; Canada; 49.04477°N 122.84851°W

Information
- School type: Public, High School
- Motto: Be the best you can be
- Founded: 1993
- School board: School District 36 Surrey
- School number: 3636156
- Principal: Michael Sweeney
- Grades: 8–12
- Enrollment: ▼1429 (2026)
- Language: English
- Area: South Surrey, Surrey, British Columbia, Canada
- Colours: Purple, black, and white
- Mascot: Orcas
- Team name: The Orcas
- Website: elginparksecondary.com; www.surreyschools.ca/schools/elginpark

Elgin Park Secondary is a public High school in School District 36 Surrey, British Columbia, Canada. Its nickname is the "Home of the Orcas". Elgin Park is one of four public high schools on the Semiahmoo peninsula, along with Earl Marriott Secondary School, Semiahmoo Secondary School, and Grandview Heights Secondary School. Its namesake is Port Elgin, British Columbia, an early colonial settlement along the banks of the Nicomeckl River.

== Academics ==
Elgin Park Secondary offers Aboriginal Learning, Safe Schools, Online and Distance Learning (SAIL), Surrey Schools One, Tutoring, Summer Learning, Inclusive Education Support, sports and extra-curriculars, as well as Science Co-op and Humanities Co-op programs.

For the 2019–2019 school-year, Elgin Park Secondary was ranked 82/253 in British Columbian secondary schools (42/246 in the 5 years preceding 2019) by the Fraser Institute, and has an average of 98.70% of students graduating (2018–2019). Elgin Park Secondary offers 2 Advanced Placement courses, being AP Art and Design and AP Calculus AB. Until 2026, Elgin Park also offered AP Computer Science A, however it was discontinued due to lack of registration.

Elgin Park and Tamanawis Secondary School (both in School District 36 Surrey) have virtually the same architectural basis, apart from an addition onto Elgin Park constructed in the early 2000s.

As of June 2026, Michael Sweeney is the principal.

== Extra-curricular activities ==
Elgin Park Secondary extracurriculars include sports teams and school bands. There are also student-run clubs.

=== Sports ===
- Fall: Volleyball, Boys' Soccer, Swimming, Cross-country, Ice hockey.
- Winter: Basketball, Curling
- Spring: Rugby, Badminton, Girls' Soccer, Ultimate frisbee, Golf, Tennis, Track and field, Spike ball
