= Boundary Bay, British Columbia =

Neighbourhood in Tsawwassen, British Columbia, Canada

Coordinates: 49.005°N 123.0384°W

Named for, and located adjacent to the bay of the same name, Boundary Bay is a residential neighbourhood in the community of Tsawwassen (Delta, British Columbia, Canada). Directly south of the neighbourhood, and across the international border, is the residential neighbourhood of Maple Beach, Washington, in Point Roberts, Washington. The traditional name of the location in the Downriver dialect of the Halkomelem language is Chiltinm or Chiltenm. The Boundary Bay Airport is a notable inclusion in this area.
