= White Rock, British Columbia =

White Rock
- City
- City of White Rock
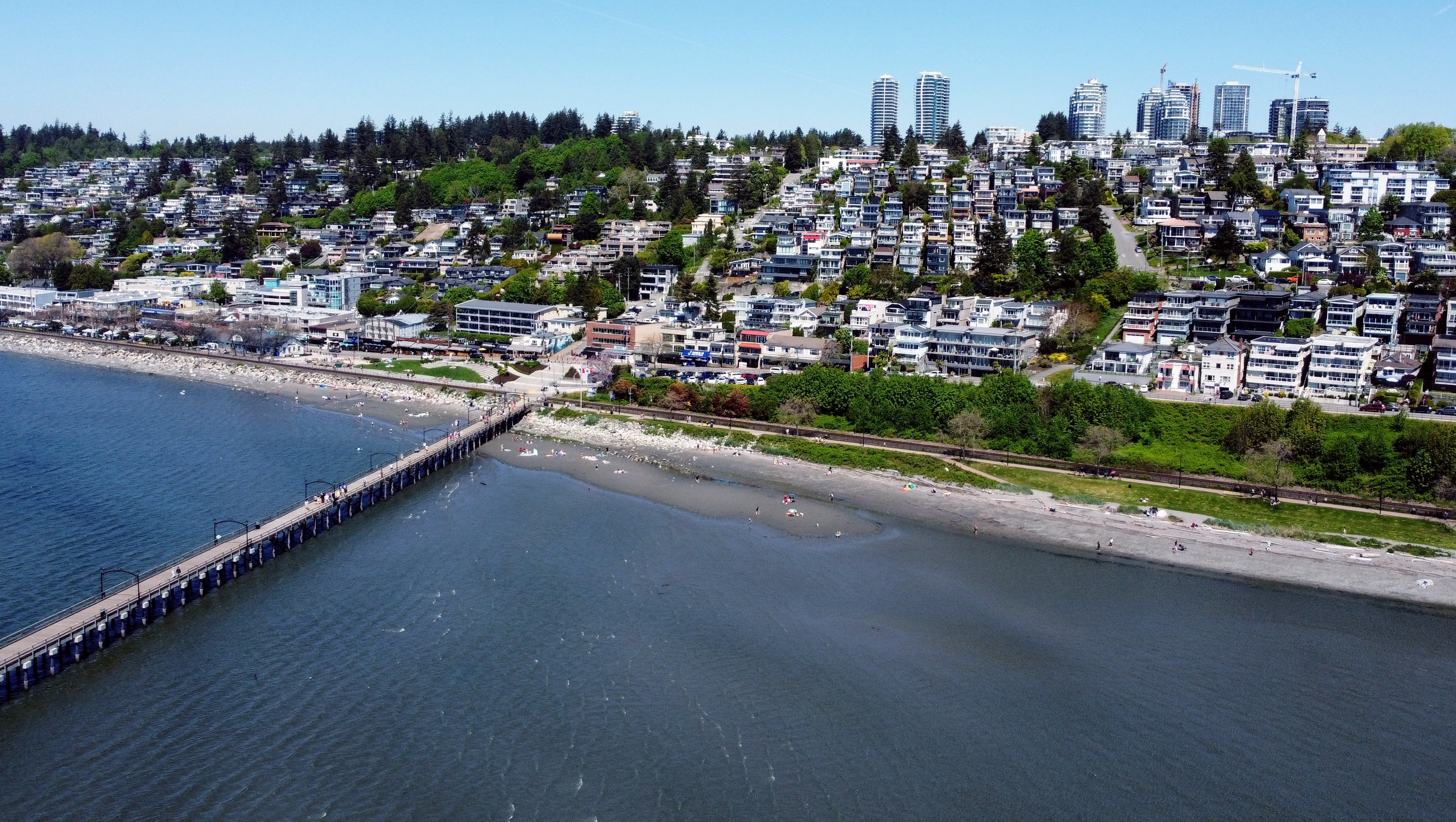
- White Rock waterfront

- Flag Coat of arms
- Motto: City by the Sea
- Location of White Rock in Metro Vancouver
- Coordinates: 49°1′30″N 122°48′10″W
- Country: Canada
- Province: British Columbia
- Regional district: Metro Vancouver
- Incorporated: April 15, 1957
- Seat: White Rock City Hall

Government
  - Type: Mayor–council government
  - Body: White Rock City Council
  - Mayor: Chris Shields
  - City Council: List of councillors: David Chesney; Erika Johanson; Scott Kristjanson; Anthony Manning; Christopher Trevelyan
  - MP: Ernie Klassen (Liberal)
  - MLA: Trevor Halford (BC Conservative)

Area
  - Land: 5.17 km^{2} (2.00 sq mi)
  - Urban: 54.23 km^{2} (20.94 sq mi)
- Elevation: 80 m (260 ft)

Population (2021)
  - City: 21,939
  - Estimate (2023): 22,362
  - Density: 4,240.6/km^{2} (10,983/sq mi)
  - Urban: 109,167
  - Urban density: 2,013.1/km^{2} (5,214/sq mi)
- Time zone: UTC−07:00 (Pacific Time)
- Forward sortation area: V4B
- Area codes: 604, 778, 236, 672
- Website: whiterockcity.ca

White Rock is a city in the Metro Vancouver Regional District, British Columbia, Canada. It is bordered by Semiahmoo Bay to the south and is surrounded on three sides by Surrey. To the southeast across a footbridge lies the Semiahmoo First Nation, which is within the borders of Surrey. Semiahmoo Bay and the Southern Gulf Islands in the Strait of Georgia are also to the south.

White Rock is named for a large white boulder on its beach near the promenade, a glacial erratic that migrated south during the last glaciation. The 486-ton granite boulder was kept white by shellfish-eating seabirds whose guano covered the rock so much that 19th-century sailors used it as a beacon. It is now kept white through monthly applications of white paint by the city parks department and has been a graffiti target. The White Rock Pier is located nearby.

== History ==
=== Early history ===
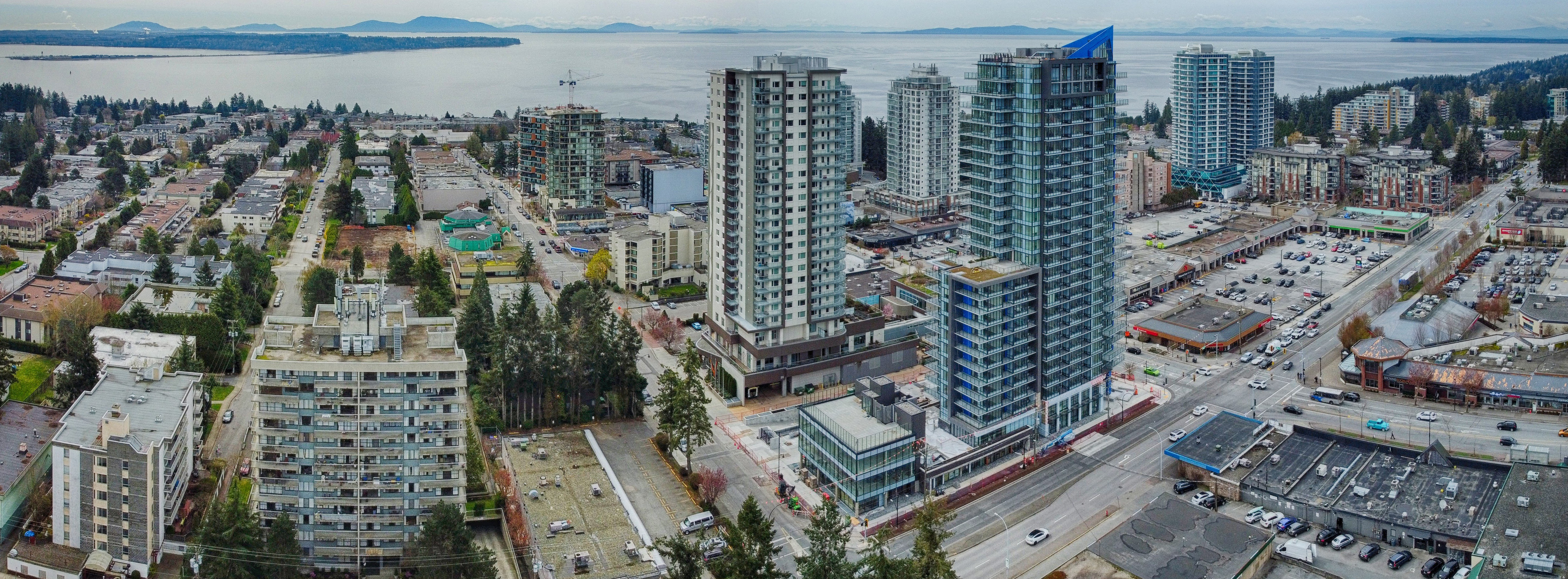
Uptown neighbourhood adjacent to White Rock Centre

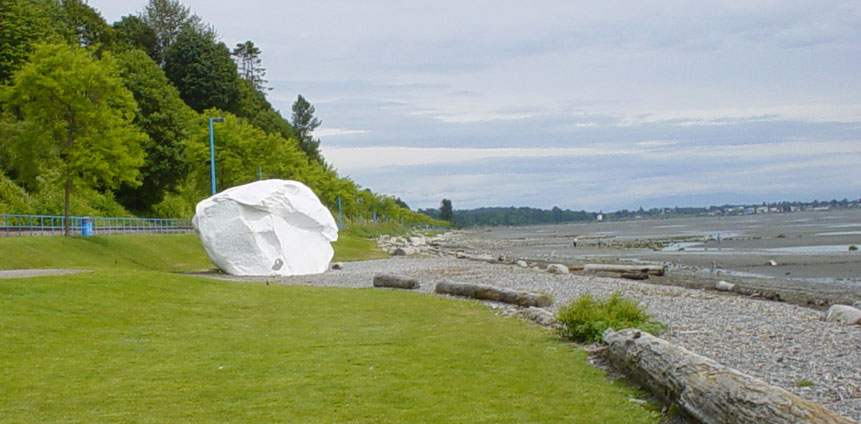
The white rock

The Straits Salish people dominated the region from Boundary Bay in the north to Birch Bay in the south (in the U.S.). Semiahmoo First Nation permanent encampments were known to exist between 1791, the first European contact, and the 1850s, the beginnings of European settlement. These were located along the waterfront at the eastern and western limits of the present City of White Rock. The Semiahmoo people also constructed forts as lookouts for raiders from the northern first nations; one is located in the Ocean Park area.

The Oregon boundary dispute culminated in the Oregon Treaty of 1846, which settled the outstanding border issues between Great Britain and the United States. Previously, these issues had been put on hold through a shared occupancy agreement of the Oregon territory by the two nations in the Treaty of 1818. In turn, the International Boundary Survey Commission began in 1857 to set the boundary between the United States and British North America, roughly along the 49th parallel, which runs through Semiahmoo Bay and Boundary Bay to Point Roberts, Washington.

The Semiahmoo Trail still exists in White Rock and South Surrey, running from the site of the Boundary Commission Camp at the estuary of the Campbell River, overland to Mud Bay north of Crescent Beach. An 1865 survey map calls this route the "Telegraph Trail". During the real-estate boom of the 1980s and 90s, the City of Surrey preserved much of the trail, extending it from 20 Avenue to the Nicomekl River. On 148 Street, a specially constructed "Semiahmoo Trail" pedestrian overpass keeps the trail intact.

=== Modern history ===
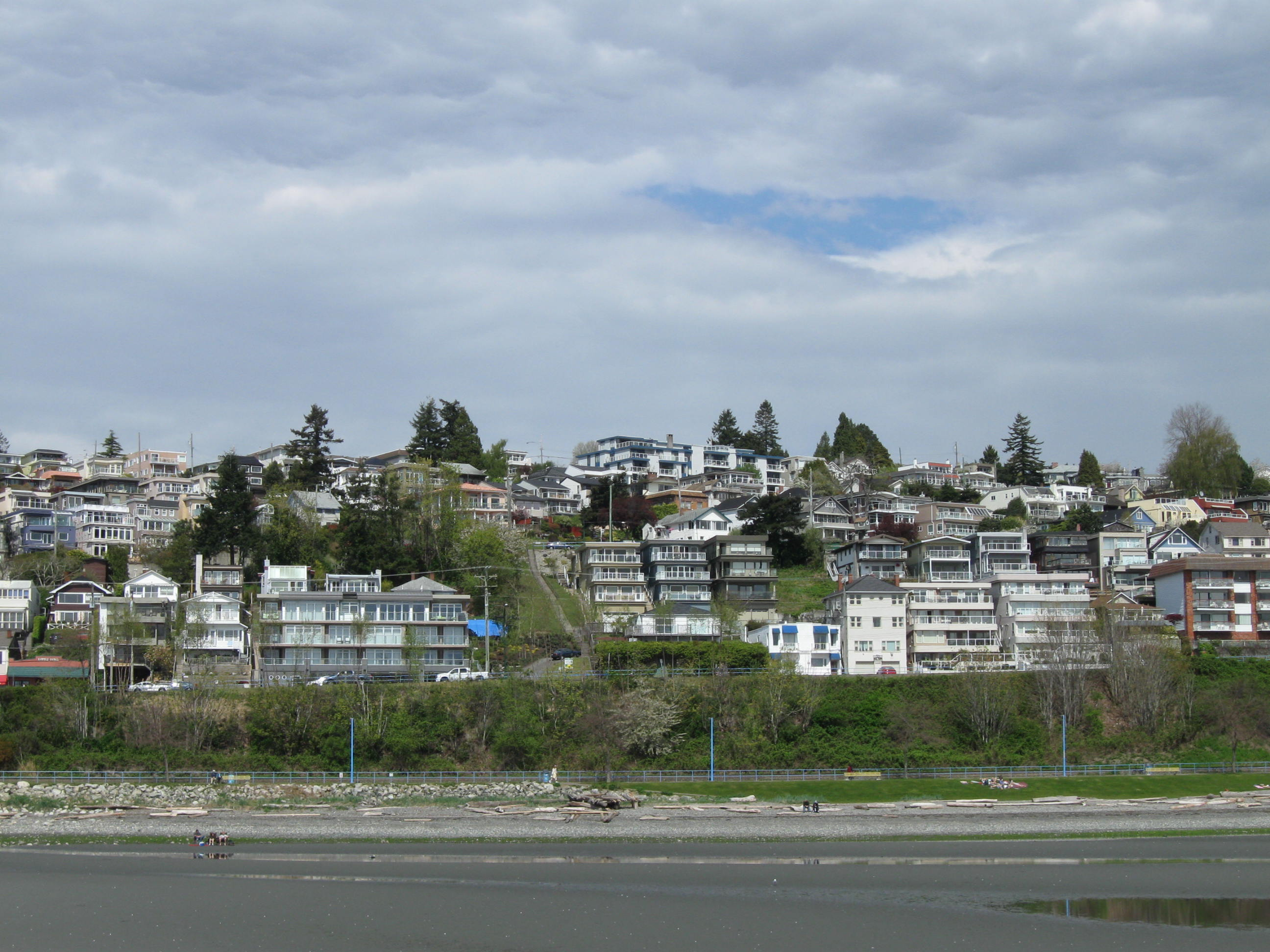
The city from White Rock Pier

The modern history of White Rock is directly tied to the railway linking British Columbia to Washington state, which runs along the shore of Semiahmoo Bay to the border. The rail is currently owned by BNSF Railway and runs alongside the promenade at the beach. This was originally the Great Northern line, and it opened up White Rock and Crescent Beach to tourists from Vancouver and New Westminster in the early 1900s. The border crossing closest to White Rock (at Douglas, Surrey, and Blaine, Washington) was officially opened in 1908, and the Peace Arch at the border crossing was constructed in the 1920s.

In 1913, the present railway station was opened, and the Fox and Hunter Shingle mill began operation. The Campbell River Mill also opened to the east, bringing a minor boom in the local economy. The now-famous pier was opened in 1914 to provide a deep-water mooring facility.

In the 1950s, White Rock residents began to feel isolated from the then–District of Surrey, where development was being concentrated elsewhere, particularly in North Surrey and Cloverdale. On April 15, 1957, a special warrant from the Government of British Columbia created the City of White Rock within its present boundary.

In the 1950s, Peace Arch Hospital opened and continues as a major employer in the city and health facility for the region.

Development was concentrated near the waterfront until the 1960s and 1970s. Many small cliffside dwellings were affordable to those unable to pay the cost of living closer to Vancouver. White Rock gained a reputation for being a retirement centre, as it features the lowest rainfall in the Metro Vancouver region, while benefitting from the influence of the ocean, keeping both summers highs and winter lows bearable.

The development of Highway 99 and the opening of the Deas Island Tunnel (now the George Massey Tunnel) created a second boom for the White Rock area, providing a more convenient commuter route to Vancouver. No longer dependent upon the railway, development crept up the hillside. In the 1980s, the City of Surrey designated South Surrey as a town centre comparable to Guildford, Cloverdale, and Newton. The Semiahmoo Mall opened in Surrey on the north side of 16 Avenue (the south side of which is North Bluff Road within White Rock).

In 1979, chartered accountant Tom Kirstein and architect Chip Barrett organized an annual sandcastle competition, which became internationally famous. The event took advantage of the long, sandy beach exposed at low tide, giving enough time for entrants to construct elaborate displays. Prizes of up to $10,000 were awarded, and crowds of 150,000 were estimated at the competition's height. In 1987, the contest was ended because of security costs and concerns. In 2008, a group of local high school students (Sara Woodward, Jorden Abernethy, Daniel Fowler, Michael Vanderpolder, and Tasha Svenson) and members of the community (Spenser Bolen, Michael Nolan, Trixie Nolan, and Lisa Nolan) launched a Sandcastle Competition revival. This competition drew 40,000 guests and over 70 teams.

The 1970s saw the White Rock/South Surrey area develop into a suburban bedroom community of the Lower Mainland. A real-estate boom in the area drew many young families to homes marketed to young professionals, a process that intensified in the mid-1990s. Today, many parts of the community resemble the type of suburban development seen across North America. Some cliffside cottages have given way to large homes, and multimillion-dollar properties have appeared in the area.

Uptown White Rock has been the site of significant new developments in recent years, with medium-rise condos becoming more prominent. The City of White Rock's fire department was located half a block north of its city limits until the early 1990s, when a new firehall was built across from City Hall. The White Rock Little League team played in the 2007 Little League World Series.

On December 20, 2018, during a severe windstorm, the White Rock Pier was severed when sailboats broke free from the attached marina and crashed into the pier destroying a 30-metre section. At least 15 boats sank and several were wedged underneath the pier's pilings. Replacement plans call for a new pier that could be built by the end of August 2019, with an early cost estimate that is projected to be over $5 million. As of May 2, 2019, the cost estimate for a rebuild to modern seismic standards is $16.2 million. On August 28, 2019, the pier re-opened to the public although certain elements such as lighting have yet to be completed.

Megan Knight has been mayor since 2022.

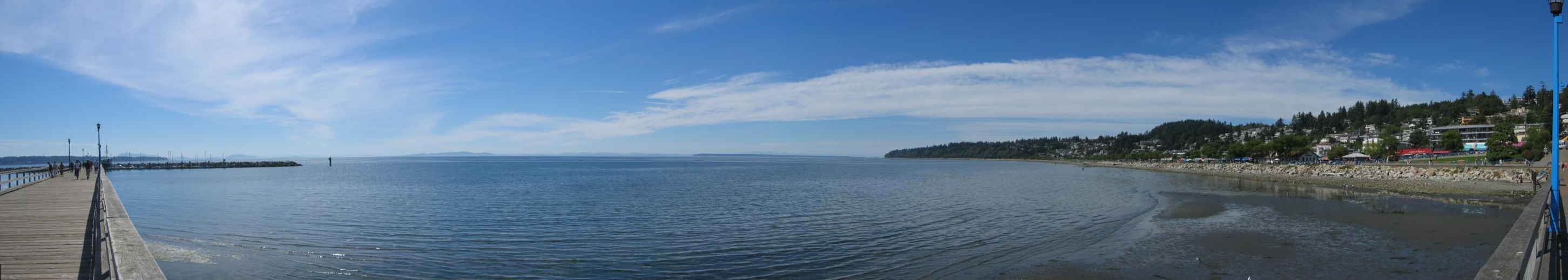
Promenade and Semiahmoo Bay, from the pier

== Geography ==
The boundaries between White Rock and Surrey are Bergstrom Road (136 Street) to the west, North Bluff Road (16th Avenue) to the north, Stayte Road (160 Street) to the east, and 8th Avenue to the south. The area south of 8 Avenue from Stayte Road westward to where 8 Avenue meets the water is the Semiahmoo Indian Reserve and lies within the bounds of the City of Surrey (though it is governed separately). The Surrey neighbourhoods of Ocean Park and Crescent Beach lie immediately to the northwest.

=== Climate ===
White Rock has a moderate climate, with average daily high temperatures of 23 degrees Celsius in summer and 6 degrees Celsius in winter.

White Rock's climate is moderate year-round. Because the city is set away from the Coast Mountains, it sees less fog, fewer rainy days and shorter snowfalls. Meteorological statistics show that White Rock does, in fact, receive 20 percent more sunshine than does Vancouver. Temperatures average 21 °C (70 °F) in summer and 6 °C (43 °F) in winter. Annual rainfall averages 1,105 mm (43.5 in).

The record high temperature was 38.5 °C (101.3 °F) recorded June 28, 2021; with the record high daily minimum of 20.9 °C (69.6 °F) also recorded the same day. The record highest dew point was 22.0 °C (71.6 °F) recorded July 29, 2009. The most humid month was July 1998 with an average dew point of 15.9 °C (60.6 °F). The warmest month was August 2022 with an average mean temperature of 19.3 °C (66.7 °F).

Climate data for White Rock (1991–2020 normals, extremes 1929–present)
Month	Jan	Feb	Mar	Apr	May	Jun	Jul	Aug	Sep	Oct	Nov	Dec	Year
Record high humidex	—	—	—	28	32	46	39	41	35	26	—	—	46
Record high °C (°F)	17.2 (63.0)	20.5 (68.9)	25.8 (78.4)	27.4 (81.3)	31.5 (88.7)	38.5 (101.3)	36.2 (97.2)	37.0 (98.6)	31.7 (89.1)	28.9 (84.0)	20.6 (69.1)	17.3 (63.1)	38.5 (101.3)
Mean maximum °C (°F)	13.1 (55.6)	14.3 (57.7)	17.3 (63.1)	21.7 (71.1)	25.0 (77.0)	26.7 (80.1)	28.8 (83.8)	28.1 (82.6)	25.9 (78.6)	20.6 (69.1)	15.7 (60.3)	12.7 (54.9)	30.8 (87.4)
Mean daily maximum °C (°F)	7.7 (45.9)	9.2 (48.6)	11.3 (52.3)	14.1 (57.4)	17.4 (63.3)	19.7 (67.5)	22.1 (71.8)	22.1 (71.8)	19.4 (66.9)	14.5 (58.1)	10.3 (50.5)	7.3 (45.1)	14.6 (58.3)
Daily mean °C (°F)	4.8 (40.6)	5.4 (41.7)	7.3 (45.1)	9.9 (49.8)	13.1 (55.6)	15.5 (59.9)	17.7 (63.9)	17.6 (63.7)	14.9 (58.8)	10.7 (51.3)	7.1 (44.8)	4.4 (39.9)	10.6 (51.1)
Mean daily minimum °C (°F)	2.2 (36.0)	2.5 (36.5)	4.1 (39.4)	6.2 (43.2)	9.2 (48.6)	11.8 (53.2)	13.6 (56.5)	13.6 (56.5)	11.1 (52.0)	7.5 (45.5)	4.3 (39.7)	2.0 (35.6)	7.3 (45.2)
Mean minimum °C (°F)	−5.1 (22.8)	−3.2 (26.2)	−1.4 (29.5)	1.6 (34.9)	4.5 (40.1)	8.2 (46.8)	10.2 (50.4)	10.0 (50.0)	6.4 (43.5)	1.5 (34.7)	−2.4 (27.7)	−4.5 (23.9)	−7.6 (18.3)
Record low °C (°F)	−17.2 (1.0)	−15.6 (3.9)	−11.7 (10.9)	−3.3 (26.1)	−1.7 (28.9)	1.7 (35.1)	3.3 (37.9)	3.9 (39.0)	0.0 (32.0)	−5.6 (21.9)	−14.5 (5.9)	−20.0 (−4.0)	−20.0 (−4.0)
Record low wind chill	−22	−13	−11	−2	—	—	—	—	—	−3	−16	−20	−22
Average precipitation mm (inches)	160.5 (6.32)	84.4 (3.32)	113.0 (4.45)	76.7 (3.02)	65.8 (2.59)	47.6 (1.87)	32.0 (1.26)	31.4 (1.24)	63.2 (2.49)	124.7 (4.91)	157.6 (6.20)	141.9 (5.59)	1,098.8 (43.26)
Average precipitation days (≥ 0.2 mm)	19.2	14.4	19.1	14.6	11.9	11.6	7.4	6.9	10.2	17.6	18.7	18.8	170.4
Average dew point °C (°F)	2.4 (36.3)	1.9 (35.4)	3.6 (38.5)	5.8 (42.4)	9.0 (48.2)	11.1 (52.0)	13.3 (55.9)	13.7 (56.7)	11.9 (53.4)	8.2 (46.8)	4.7 (40.5)	1.9 (35.4)	7.3 (45.1)
Source: weatherstats.ca

Climate data for White Rock (normals 1981–2010, extremes 1974–2002)
Month	Jan	Feb	Mar	Apr	May	Jun	Jul	Aug	Sep	Oct	Nov	Dec	Year
Record high °C (°F)	16.5 (61.7)	20.5 (68.9)	22.6 (72.7)	27.0 (80.6)	31.5 (88.7)	38.3 (100.9)	34.0 (93.2)	36.7 (98.1)	30.5 (86.9)	24.0 (75.2)	20.5 (68.9)	16.0 (60.8)	38.3 (100.9)
Mean daily maximum °C (°F)	7.3 (45.1)	8.9 (48.0)	11.5 (52.7)	13.8 (56.8)	17.0 (62.6)	19.3 (66.7)	21.5 (70.7)	21.8 (71.2)	19.3 (66.7)	14.2 (57.6)	9.3 (48.7)	6.4 (43.5)	14.2 (57.6)
Daily mean °C (°F)	4.6 (40.3)	5.7 (42.3)	7.8 (46.0)	10.0 (50.0)	13.1 (55.6)	15.4 (59.7)	17.2 (63.0)	17.4 (63.3)	14.8 (58.6)	10.7 (51.3)	6.7 (44.1)	3.8 (38.8)	10.6 (51.1)
Mean daily minimum °C (°F)	1.9 (35.4)	2.4 (36.3)	4.1 (39.4)	6.2 (43.2)	9.1 (48.4)	11.5 (52.7)	13.0 (55.4)	13.0 (55.4)	10.3 (50.5)	7.2 (45.0)	4.0 (39.2)	1.2 (34.2)	7.0 (44.6)
Record low °C (°F)	−12.0 (10.4)	−14.0 (6.8)	−7.2 (19.0)	−1.1 (30.0)	1.7 (35.1)	3.9 (39.0)	7.0 (44.6)	6.0 (42.8)	2.0 (35.6)	−5.5 (22.1)	−14.5 (5.9)	−14.0 (6.8)	−14.5 (5.9)
Average precipitation mm (inches)	146.8 (5.78)	99.3 (3.91)	97.5 (3.84)	83.4 (3.28)	73.2 (2.88)	59.6 (2.35)	40.3 (1.59)	37.2 (1.46)	46.4 (1.83)	111.0 (4.37)	171.2 (6.74)	139.7 (5.50)	1,105.8 (43.54)
Average rainfall mm (inches)	134.7 (5.30)	93.6 (3.69)	96.7 (3.81)	83.4 (3.28)	73.2 (2.88)	59.6 (2.35)	40.3 (1.59)	37.2 (1.46)	46.4 (1.83)	110.7 (4.36)	169.0 (6.65)	130.5 (5.14)	1,075.8 (42.35)
Average snowfall cm (inches)	12.1 (4.8)	5.7 (2.2)	0.9 (0.4)	0.0 (0.0)	0.0 (0.0)	0.0 (0.0)	0.0 (0.0)	0.0 (0.0)	0.0 (0.0)	0.3 (0.1)	2.2 (0.9)	9.2 (3.6)	30.4 (12.0)
Average precipitation days (≥ 0.2 mm)	17.6	14.3	15.7	14.3	12.3	11.4	7.1	6.0	7.9	15.1	18.8	17.0	157.4
Average rainy days (≥ 0.2 mm)	16.6	13.3	15.6	14.3	12.3	11.4	7.1	6.0	7.9	15.0	18.4	15.9	153.7
Average snowy days (≥ 0.2 cm)	1.9	1.6	0.4	0.1	0.0	0.0	0.0	0.0	0.0	0.1	0.8	2.1	6.9

== Demographics ==
In the 2021 Canadian census conducted by Statistics Canada, White Rock had a population of 21,939 living in 10,735 of its 11,541 total private dwellings, a change of 10% from its 2016 population of 19,952. With a land area of 5.17 km^{2} (2.00 sq mi), it had a population density of 4,243.5/km^{2} (10,990.7/sq mi) in 2021.

=== Ethnicity ===
Panethnic groups in White Rock (2001–2021)
Panethnic group	2021		2016		2011		2006		2001	
Panethnic group	Pop.	%	Pop.	%	Pop.	%	Pop.	%	Pop.	%
European (Note: Statistic includes all persons that did not make up part of a visible minority or an indigenous identity.)	15,185	73.27%	15,420	80.65%	16,020	86.41%	16,030	88.25%	16,035	92.55%
East Asian (Note: Statistic includes total responses of "Chinese", "Korean", and "Japanese" under visible minority section on census.)	1,900	9.17%	1,450	7.58%	1,055	5.69%	970	5.34%	485	2.8%
South Asian	1,575	7.6%	965	5.05%	410	2.21%	330	1.82%	170	0.98%
Indigenous	635	3.06%	565	2.96%	465	2.51%	290	1.6%	165	0.95%
Southeast Asian (Note: Statistic includes total responses of "Filipino" and "Southeast Asian" under visible minority section on census.)	580	2.8%	230	1.2%	330	1.78%	230	1.27%	215	1.24%
African	265	1.28%	130	0.68%	70	0.38%	125	0.69%	60	0.35%
Latin American	250	1.21%	100	0.52%	45	0.24%	145	0.8%	35	0.2%
Middle Eastern (Note: Statistic includes total responses of "West Asian" and "Arab" under visible minority section on census.)	110	0.53%	110	0.58%	30	0.16%	30	0.17%	75	0.43%
Other/multiracial (Note: Statistic includes total responses of "Visible minority, n.i.e." and "Multiple visible minorities" under visible minority section on census.)	230	1.11%	145	0.76%	70	0.38%	20	0.11%	85	0.49%
Total responses	20,725	94.47%	19,120	95.83%	18,540	95.87%	18,165	96.85%	17,325	94.93%
Total population	21,939	100%	19,952	100%	19,339	100%	18,755	100%	18,250	100%
Note: Totals greater than 100% due to multiple origin responses.

=== Religion ===
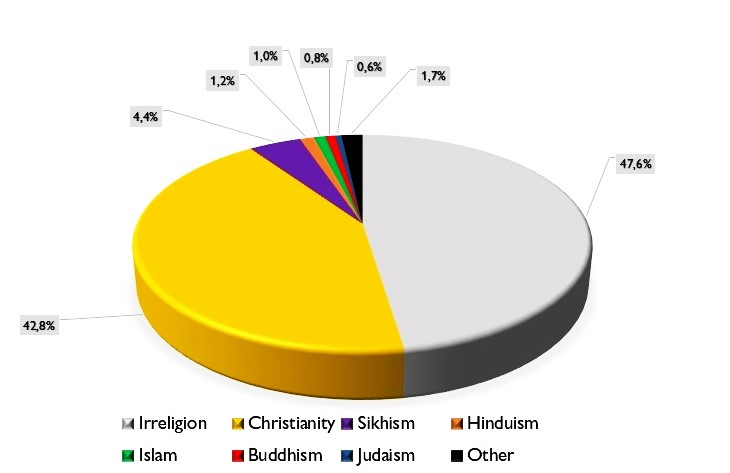
Religion in White Rock

According to the 2021 census, religious groups in White Rock included:

- Irreligion (9,855 persons or 47.6%)
- Christianity (8,875 persons or 42.8%)
- Sikhism (905 persons or 4.4%)
- Hinduism (245 persons or 1.2%)
- Islam (205 persons or 1.0%)
- Buddhism (160 persons or 0.8%)
- Judaism (115 persons or 0.6%)
- Other (360 persons or 1.7%)

== Annual events ==
Every year in July, the city hosts the Tour de White Rock, a bicycle road race that attracts over 150 local and international riders. In 2005, the event was part of the Canadian Cycling Association's national Road Race Series.

Every year during the first weekend of August, the Spirit of the Sea Festival is held on White Rock beach. It usually includes a parade, fireworks, music stages, a sandcastle competition, and various other beach-related activities. The festival began in 1949.

== Infrastructure ==
=== Transportation ===
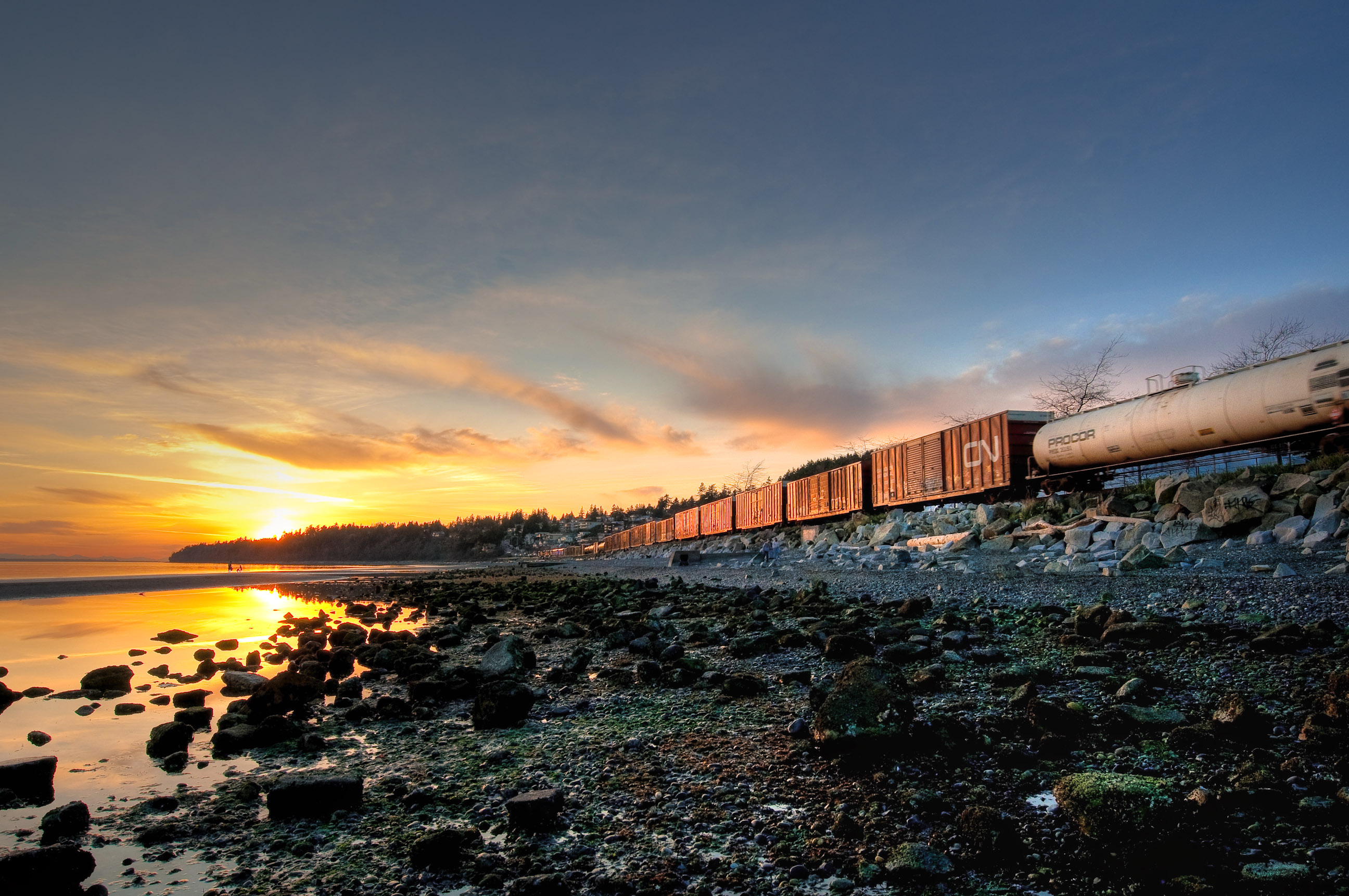
A freight train runs along the beach as the sun sets in 2009

Transportation in White Rock largely revolves around the automobile. Highway 99 is a freeway that links the White Rock area with Vancouver to the north and U.S. Interstate 5, via the Peace Arch border crossing, to the south. King George Highway (Highway 99A) links the Peace Arch border with Surrey Central station and New Westminster via the soon-to-be-replaced Pattullo Bridge. Johnston Road (152 Street) links White Rock to Guildford and the Trans-Canada Highway (Highway 1).

Most of White Rock's bus routes run through the White Rock Centre transit exchange. From there, the 351 and 354 buses, which previously ran to downtown Vancouver, now terminate at Bridgeport station in Richmond; Vancouver-bound passengers have to transfer onto the Canada Line rapid transit line. Only one route serving the area, the 352 Ocean Park/Bridgeport Station express bus, does not run through White Rock Centre, instead terminating near the South Surrey Athletic Park. The 321, 345, and 394 buses provide service to North Surrey, notably to Surrey Central and King George Skytrain stations, and the 375 service runs through White Rock Centre from just north of the Peace Arch border crossing to Guildford Town Centre. The 531 bus runs from White Rock Centre to Willowbrook Mall in Langley. Community Shuttle routes, the 360, 361, 362, and 363, service local communities within White Rock and South Surrey.

BNSF Railway has a single-track main line through White Rock that runs the length of the White Rock beach promenade. The city itself has no train service; however, this rail line is a major corridor for goods transported between the ports of Vancouver and the continental U.S., as well as for the Amtrak Cascades passenger service between Seattle and Vancouver via Bellingham, Washington. The Canadian National Railway and the Canadian Pacific Railway (CPR) also have trackage rights along the line. Goods transported on the corridor include Canadian softwood lumber, coal, paper products, and general merchandise. The CPR runs regular potash trains along the line to the Canpotex export terminal in Oregon.

== Notable people ==
- Andy Anderson, skateboarder
- Jeff Bandura, hockey player
- Hilary Caldwell, Olympic swimmer
- Paul Campbell, actor from Battlestar Galactica
- Desirée Dawson, singer and winner of the 2016 Searchlight talent contest
- Jason Garrison, journeyman National Hockey League defenseman
- Colton Gillies, former left winger for the Columbus Blue Jackets
- Christine Girard, Olympic weightlifter
- Gigi Saul Guerrero, filmmaker and actress
- Andrew Hammond, goaltender for the Colorado Avalanche
- Ellie Harvie, actress
- Gordon Hogg, former BC Liberal MLA for Surrey-White Rock (1997–2017) and Liberal Party of Canada MP for South Surrey-White Rock (2017–2019).
- George Frederick Ives, supercentenarian and last surviving Boer War veteran.
- Jim Hughson, sportscaster
- Moose Johnson, left-winger and defenseman for the Montreal Wanderers and member of the Hockey Hall of Fame
- Riall Johnson, National Football League player
- Teyo Johnson, National Football League player
- Ernie Klassen, Liberal Party of Canada MP for South Surrey—White Rock since 2025.
- Ra McGuire, singer and founder of the Canadian rock group Trooper
- Arnold Mikelson, wood sculptor
- Gabrielle Miller, actress
- Jim Mullin, President, Football Canada, broadcaster
- Gordon Rice, artist
- Hannah Simone, actress on the television series New Girl
- Cobie Smulders, actress known for playing Robin Scherbatsky in the CBS sitcom How I Met Your Mother
- Jewel Staite, actress on the television series Firefly
- Colten Teubert, hockey player
- Reece Thompson, actor
- Daniel Wesley, rock/reggae musician

== White Rock in television and film ==
Scenes from the boxing film Knockout were filmed in White Rock. Portions of the 1965 film The Railrodder starring Buster Keaton were filmed in White Rock. Much of the 1982 movie Big Meat Eater was filmed near and around the White Rock waterfront. The USA Network's detective comedy Psych was also filmed in White Rock, though the series is set in Santa Barbara, California. There is also a brief scene in Leaving Normal filmed at the White Rock waterfront. Scenes from The X-Files were also filmed here, as were scenes from the Steven Seagal movie Driven to Kill. An episode of the FX dramedy series Better Things from its second season titled "White Rock", that originally aired on November 9, 2017, had scenes that were filmed in White Rock. The Hallmark movie Like Cats & Dogs had many city scenes filmed here, as well as scenes on the public pier. K-pop girl group Twice features local White Rock gelato shop Ocean Rock Cafe on Marine Drive as well as the historic pier and railway in their 2018 music video Likey.
