= White Rock Centre =

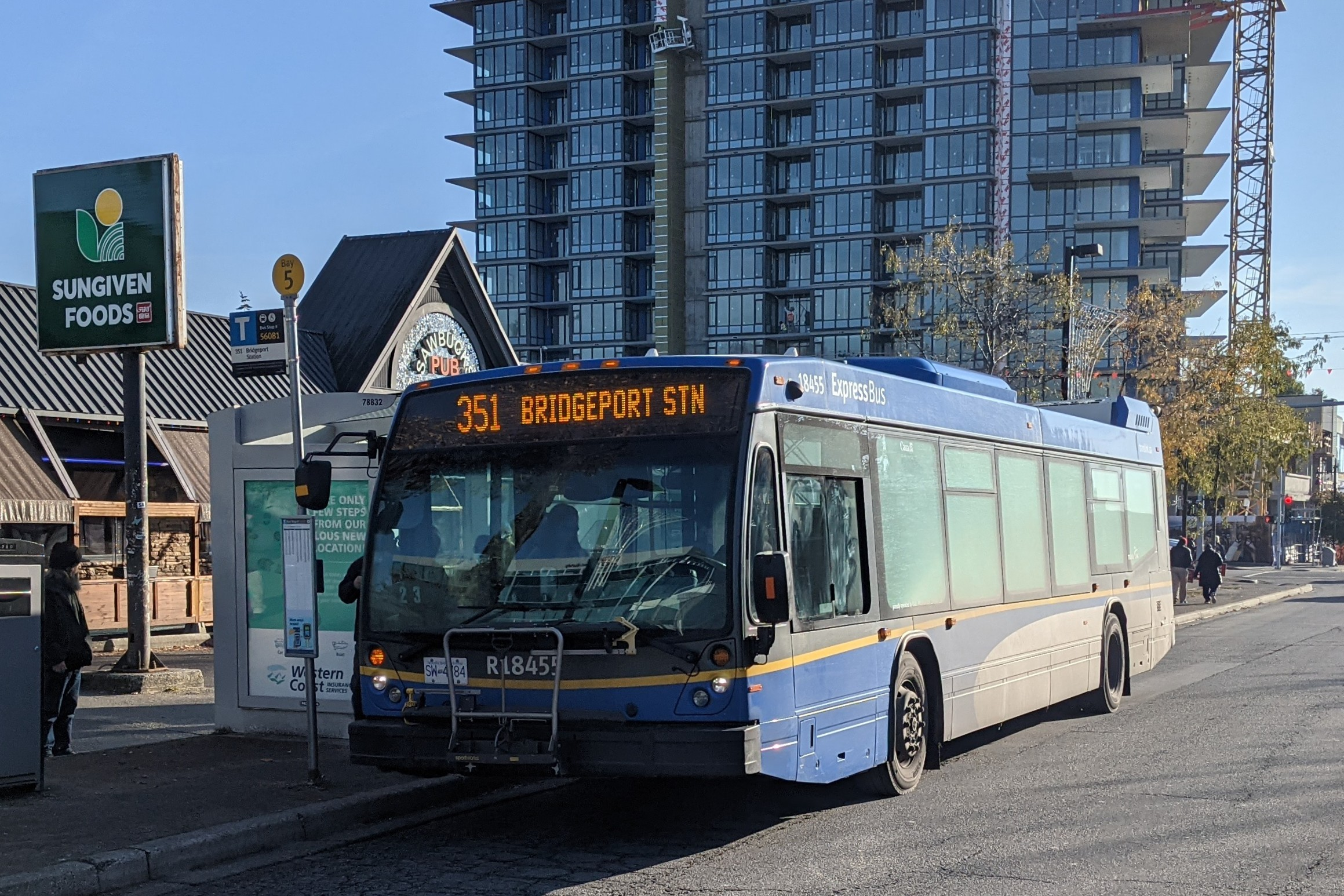
- 351 Bridgeport Station at Bay 5 on 152 Street

General information
- Location: 152 Street & 16 Avenue; Surrey, British Columbia; Johnston Road & North Bluff Road; White Rock, British Columbia; Canada
- Coordinates: 49°01′52″N 122°48′04″W
- Owner: TransLink
- Bus routes: 13
- Bus stands: 10
- Bus operators: Coast Mountain Bus Company

Other information
- Fare zone: 3

History
- Opened: April 4, 1975; 51 years ago
- Former names: White Rock Hill Top Exchange
Location

White Rock Centre is an on-street bus exchange located on the border between White Rock and Surrey, British Columbia, Canada. It is the southernmost transit hub in the Metro Vancouver region and the nearest to the Canada–United States border. As part of the TransLink system, it has routes serving White Rock and South Surrey, including towards Vancouver via Bridgeport station in Richmond, as well as to Surrey City Centre, Newton, Guildford and Langley City.

== Structure and location ==
The exchange opened on April 4, 1975, and is located at the intersection of 152 Street (Johnston Road) and 16 Avenue (North Bluff Road); it uses a curb lane and is not separated from regular traffic. Roughly half of the exchange is located on the White Rock side, while the other half lies on the Surrey side—the city limits separating the two cities run through the exchange.

Adjacent to White Rock Centre is the largest mall in the area, Semiahmoo Shopping Centre. Peace Arch Hospital, the primary hospital in the area, is located approximately 0.75 kilometres (0.47 mi) east of the exchange, while White Rock's city hall is located approximately the same distance but to the south.

White Rock Centre's location is considered to be White Rock's downtown, despite the fact that half the area lies on the Surrey side of the city border.

== Routes ==
As of April 2021, the following routes serve White Rock Centre exchange:

Bay	Location	Route	Notes
1	16 Avenue; Westbound	350 Crescent Beach	
1	16 Avenue; Westbound	351 White Rock Centre	Express
1	16 Avenue; Westbound	360 Ocean Park	
2	16 Avenue; Eastbound	360 Peace Arch Hospital	
3	Johnston Road; Southbound	321 White Rock Centre	
3	Johnston Road; Southbound	345 White Rock Centre	Weekdays only
3	Johnston Road; Southbound	361 Ocean Park	
3	Johnston Road; Southbound	362 Seaside	
3	Johnston Road; Southbound	363 Southpoint	
4	16 Avenue; Eastbound	321 White Rock South	Limited service
4	16 Avenue; Eastbound	360 Peace Arch Hospital	
4	16 Avenue; Eastbound	363 Peace Arch Hospital	
4	16 Avenue; Eastbound	375 White Rock South	
5	152 Street; Northbound	351 Bridgeport Station	Express
6	152 Street; Northbound	394 King George Station	Express; weekday peak hours only
7	152 Street; Northbound	321 Surrey Central Station; 321 Scott Road Station; 321 New Westminster Station	Peak hour trips extend to Scott Road Station; Limited service to New Westminster station on Sundays and holidays when SkyTrain is not operating.
7	152 Street; Northbound	345 King George Station	Weekdays only
7	152 Street; Northbound	375 Guildford	
8	152 Street; Northbound	361 Ocean Park	
8	152 Street; Northbound	362 Seaside	
9	152 Street; Northbound	531 Willowbrook	
10	152 Street; Southbound	321 White Rock Centre	
10	152 Street; Southbound	345 White Rock Centre	Weekdays only
10	152 Street; Southbound	351 White Rock Centre	Express
10	152 Street; Southbound	352 Bridgeport Station	Express; weekday AM peak hours only
10	152 Street; Southbound	354 Bridgeport Station	Express; weekday AM peak hours only
10	152 Street; Southbound	361 Ocean Park	
10	152 Street; Southbound	362 Seaside	
10	152 Street; Southbound	375 White Rock South	

== See also ==
- List of bus routes in Metro Vancouver
