= Semiahmoo Shopping Centre =

- Semiahmoo Shopping Centre in 2026
- Location: Surrey, British Columbia, Canada
- Coordinates: 49.0326°N 122.80223°W
- Address: 1711 152 Street
- Opened: October 29, 1980; 46 years ago
- Manager: First Capital Realty
- Num. of stores: 77
- Num. of anchor tenants: 2
- Floor area: 253,200 square feet (23,520 m^{2}) (figure includes the enclosed Centre and free-standing buildings)
- Floors: 1
- Parking: 1200
- Website: www.shopsemiahmoo.com

Interior of the mall in 2026

Food Court of the mall in 2026

Semiahmoo Shopping Centre (/ˌsɛmiˈæmuː/ SEH-mee-AH-moo) is an indoor shopping mall on the Semiahmoo peninsula in Surrey, British Columbia, Canada. Opened in 1980, the shopping centre is named after the nearby Semiahmoo Bay and is currently anchored by Save-On-Foods and Winners.

== History ==
The mall opened with a Kmart discount department store as an anchor tenant featuring an Automotive Centre and a Kmart Cafeteria. Kmart closed this location in 1998.

In 2013, the mall featured one of only three remaining Zellers-branded department stores still operating in the country, with plans for the brand to continue as a crossover with Hudson's Bay. In June 2014, First Capital announced that the Zellers store would close and be replaced by another retailer. It was confirmed on May 15, 2019, that a Winners store would be replacing the former Zellers.

== Redevelopment ==
Bosa Properties purchased the mall in 2002 and had major plans to expand and redevelop the property.

In March 2010, Semiahmoo Shopping Centre went through a much-needed upgrade to the interior of the mall. The exterior of the mall lost several tenants as the structures that housed their businesses were demolished to accommodate the exterior upgrade.

Plans for residential and commercial redevelopment were put on hold amid concerns that nearby developments in Grandview Heights and Morgan Crossing affected the commercial and residential viability of the town centre. Bosa sold the mall in June 2010 to First Capital Realty, an investment company.

== Transportation ==
White Rock Centre is adjacent to the mall, with TransLink bus services to other parts of White Rock, Surrey, Langley, and Richmond. Parking access is available from Martin Drive and 152nd Street.

== See also ==
- List of shopping malls in Canada
