= Grandview Heights Secondary School =

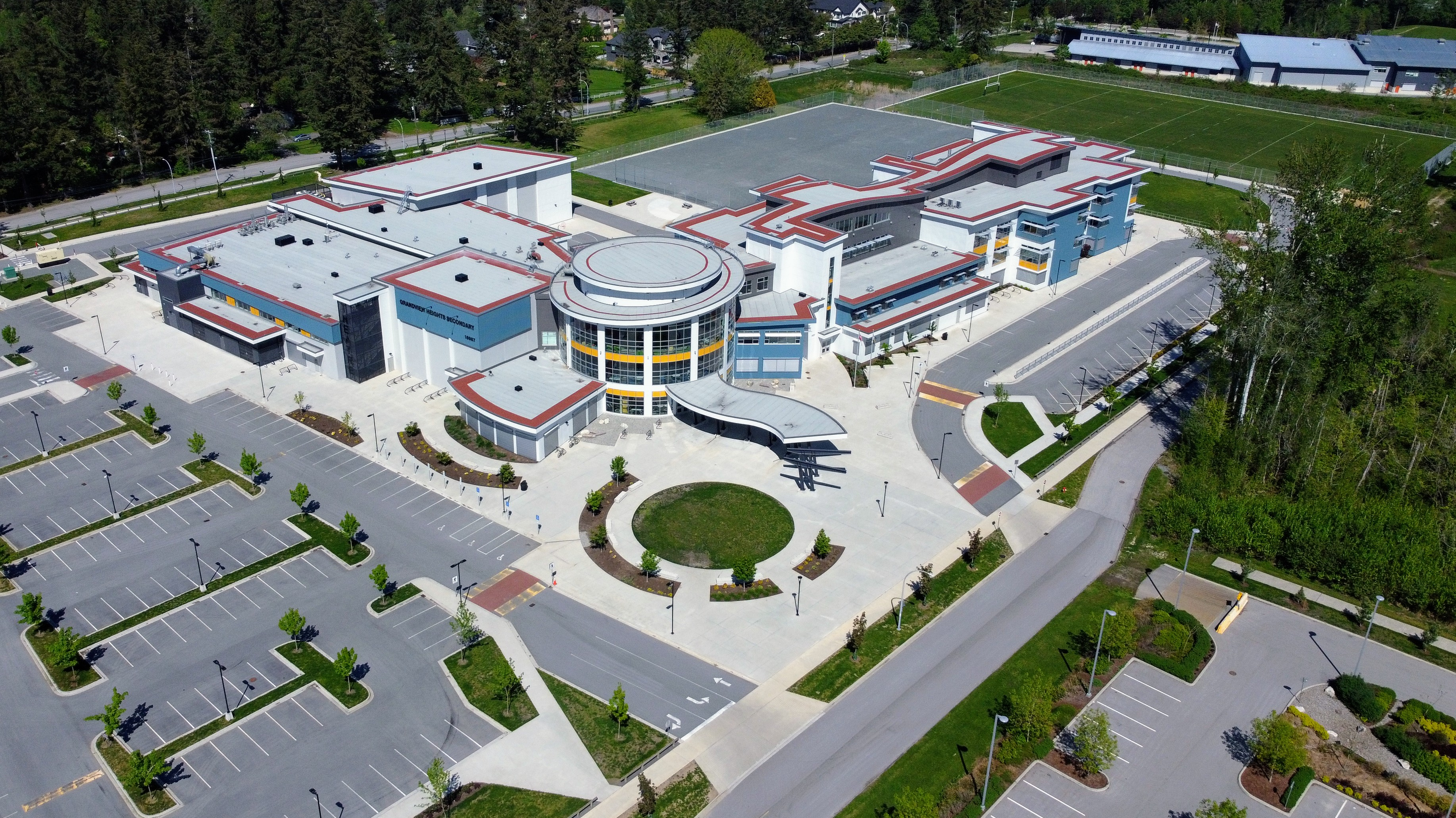
- Grandview Heights in May 2023

Location
- 16987 25 Avenue; CA-BC; Surrey, British Columbia, V3Z 0Z9; Canada; 49.0480°N 122.7526°W

Information
- School type: Public, secondary school
- Motto: As Grizzlies we come to Grandview Heights seeking safe and respectful connections to our land, community, and one another. We value Kindness, Curiosity, Resiliency, and Personal Growth.
- Established: c. 2021
- School board: School District 36 Surrey
- Principal: Darren Bedard
- Grades: 8-12
- Enrollment: ▲1952 (2026)
- Language: English
- Area: Grandview Heights, Surrey
- Colours: Navy Blue, Yellow
- Slogan: where everybody is somebody
- Team name: Grizzlies
- Website: www.surreyschools.ca/schools/grandviewheights/

Grandview Heights Secondary School is a public secondary school in Surrey, British Columbia, Canada and is a part of School District 36 Surrey.

== History ==
Grandview Heights was part of Surrey's plan to construct 10 new schools due to immigration, population growth, and the aging of existing school infrastructure. Construction of Grandview Heights Secondary School began in 2017, and was completed in September 2021. It was intended to be completed in September 2020, however, rising constructions costs delayed the school's construction by approximately one year.

The first class graduated one year after it was completed in June 2023; for the first year of the school's operation, there were no students in the twelfth grade.

Since the school's opening, it has suffered from overcrowding issues due to population growth. In 2023, less than two years after it was completed, portable classrooms had to be added to keep up with the growing number of students, and more are expected to be added in the coming years.
