= Ocean Park, Surrey =

Neighborhood in British Columbia, Canada

Coordinates: 49°01.6′N 122°52.275′W

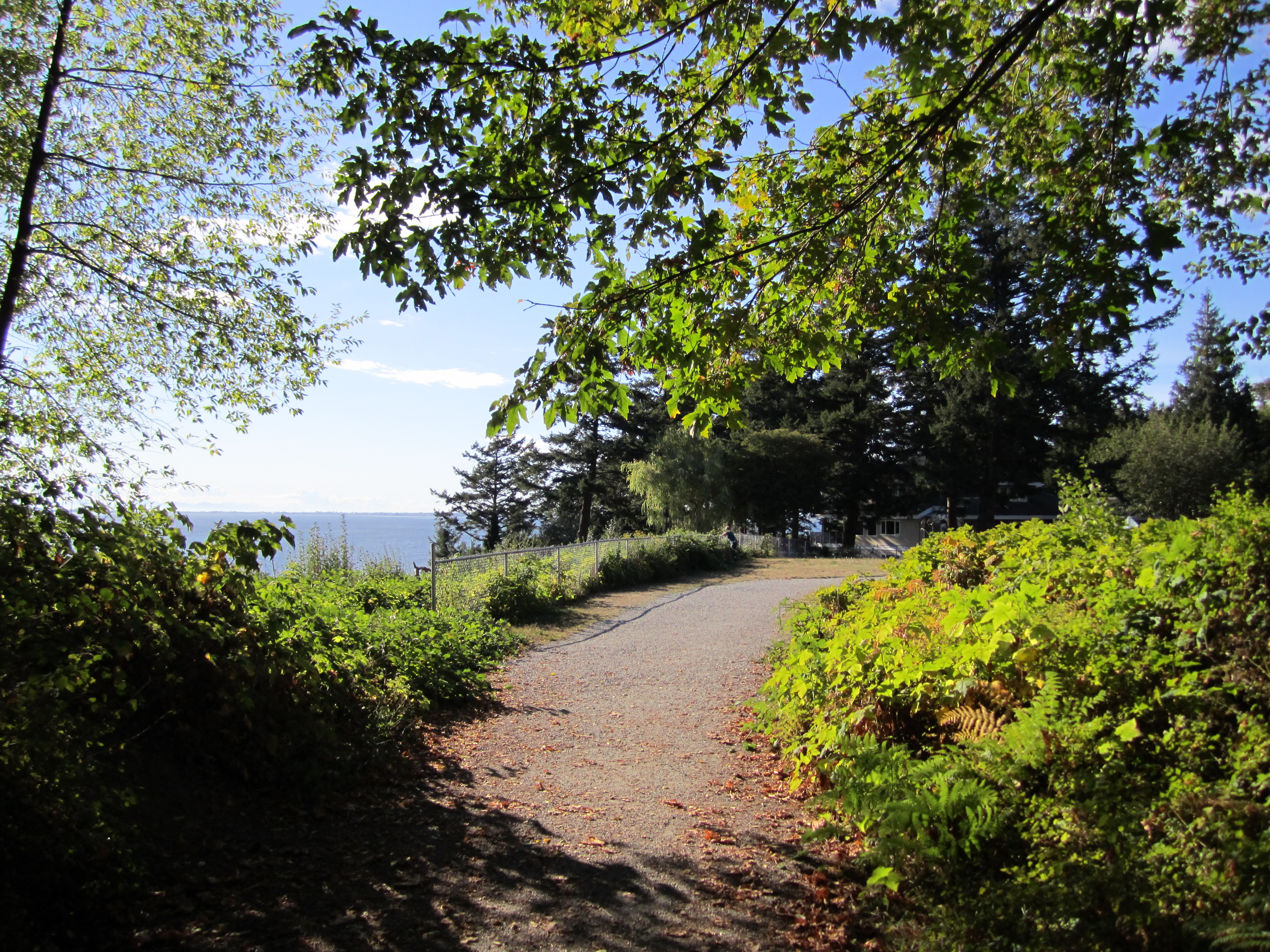
Camp Kwomais, now a public park, overlooks Semiahmoo Bay from the southwest corner of Ocean Park

Ocean Park is a neighbourhood of South Surrey, a region of Surrey, British Columbia.

== History ==
=== Pre-colonial ===
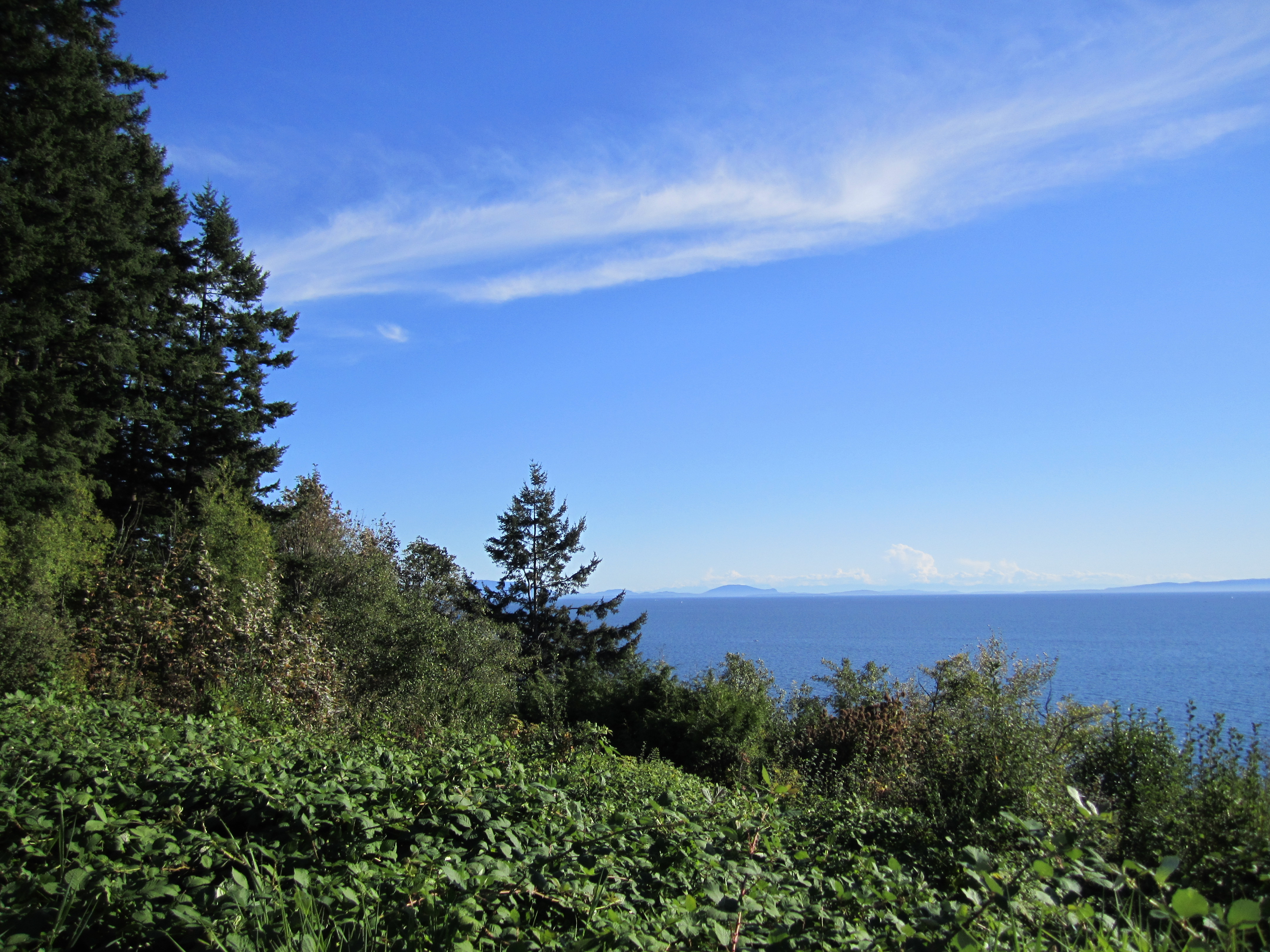
Overlooking the ocean from Kwomais point

Ocean Park was part of the territory of the Semiahmoo people, one of a group of tribes called the Straits Salish, a division of the Coast Salish.

They used this place for spiritual renewal and named the area "Kwomais" which literally means place of vision, because of its high bluffs and unobstructed views to the ocean and islands. Kwomais Point is marked on many early navigation maps and has long been used as a lookout point. For protection against the raids of the Laich-kwil-tach the Semiahmoo built a fort in Ocean Park possibly between 1820 and 1830. The fort fell into disrepair in colonial times. Today, the site is a subdivision called Indian Fort Drive near the west end of 20th Avenue.

=== Colonial and modern ===
In 1886, early pioneer Ben Stevenson acquired 350 acres (140 ha) of land and built a large home overlooking Semiahmoo Bay.

In the early 1900s, 136 acres (55 ha) were acquired in order to provide the members of the Methodist church a place where they could vacation. Promotional materials named the area “Ocean Park”, and in 1910 the church offered its first summer camp. In 1925 the Methodist Church joined with The United Church of Canada, and the camp was administered by British Columbia Conference of the church. Over the years bits of the property were sold for housing. In 2007 the last remaining 13 acres (5.3 ha) of the site were sold to the City of Surrey as parkland. Camp Kwomais was the second oldest camp accredited with BC Camping and the oldest camp using its original campsite.

In 1912, campers built a small shed beside the tracks of the recently completed railroad. The Great Northern Railway reluctantly accepted it as a stop, thereby giving easier access to vacation spots in Ocean Park for residents of Vancouver and New Westminster.

In 1921, Ocean Park opened its first post office, which was featured in Ripley's Believe It or Not! as 'the world's smallest post office'. The 6 feet (1.8 m)-by-6-feet building was later expanded to 6 feet (1.8 m)-by-12-feet.

In 1925, the Ocean Park Community Hall opened after a community fundraising campaign. The Hall continues to be the focus for the community and has been home to hundreds of social gatherings and special events for thousands over generations. The Hall’s 75th anniversary in 2000 resulted in a special edition of the Ocean Parker, a volunteer community newspaper. The Hall is operated by the Ocean Park Community Association.

In the 1950s, Ocean Park’s first residential telephone was installed at the house of firefighter Derek Uren.

In 1958, the volunteer fire hall was built by the community, seven years after a house fire killed a woman and her two sons.

In 1985, Fun Fun Park was created by community volunteers as the first “Volunteers in Parks” in BC. 12-year-old Jessica Tuttle was awarded 10 silver dollars for her winning entry in the naming contest.

In 2002, the community association’s Ocean Park Area Livability Study identified three main community issues: 1) traffic concerns 2) lack of policing and vandalism 3) lack of community recreation opportunities, especially for youth and seniors.

== Geography and climate ==
Ocean Park is the most western part of the Semiahmoo Peninsula, bounded by the waters of Semiahmoo Bay and Boundary Bay. On land, Ocean Park borders the neighbourhood of Crescent Beach to the north and the city of White Rock to the east.

== Economy ==
Ocean Park has a business and shopping centre. In 2006, actors Danny DeVito and Matthew Broderick starred in the movie Deck the Halls on a purpose-built set in Ocean Park.

== Amenities ==
Ocean Park is served by four elementary schools: Crescent Park Elementary School, Ocean Cliff Elementary School, Ray Shepherd Elementary and Laronde Elementary School. Both Crescent Park and Laronde offer French Immersion programs.

St. Mark's Anglican Church opened in 1966. The Surrey Public Library operates a branch in Ocean Park.

There are two waterfront walks in Ocean Park. 1001 Steps Park, at the foot of 128th Street near Camp Kwomais, has stairs down to waterfront access and nature trails. Ocean Park Shoreline Walk is a tidal-beach walk. The beach is a clothing-optional one just as the Wreck Beach.

== Transportation ==
Ocean Park has morning and afternoon commuter bus service to Bridgeport Station operated by TransLink (British Columbia) on route 352 Ocean Park/Bridgeport Station via the South Surrey Park & Ride. All day service on a 30-minute frequency is provided by the #350 Crescent Beach / White Rock Centre service.
