= Economy of the Bahamas =

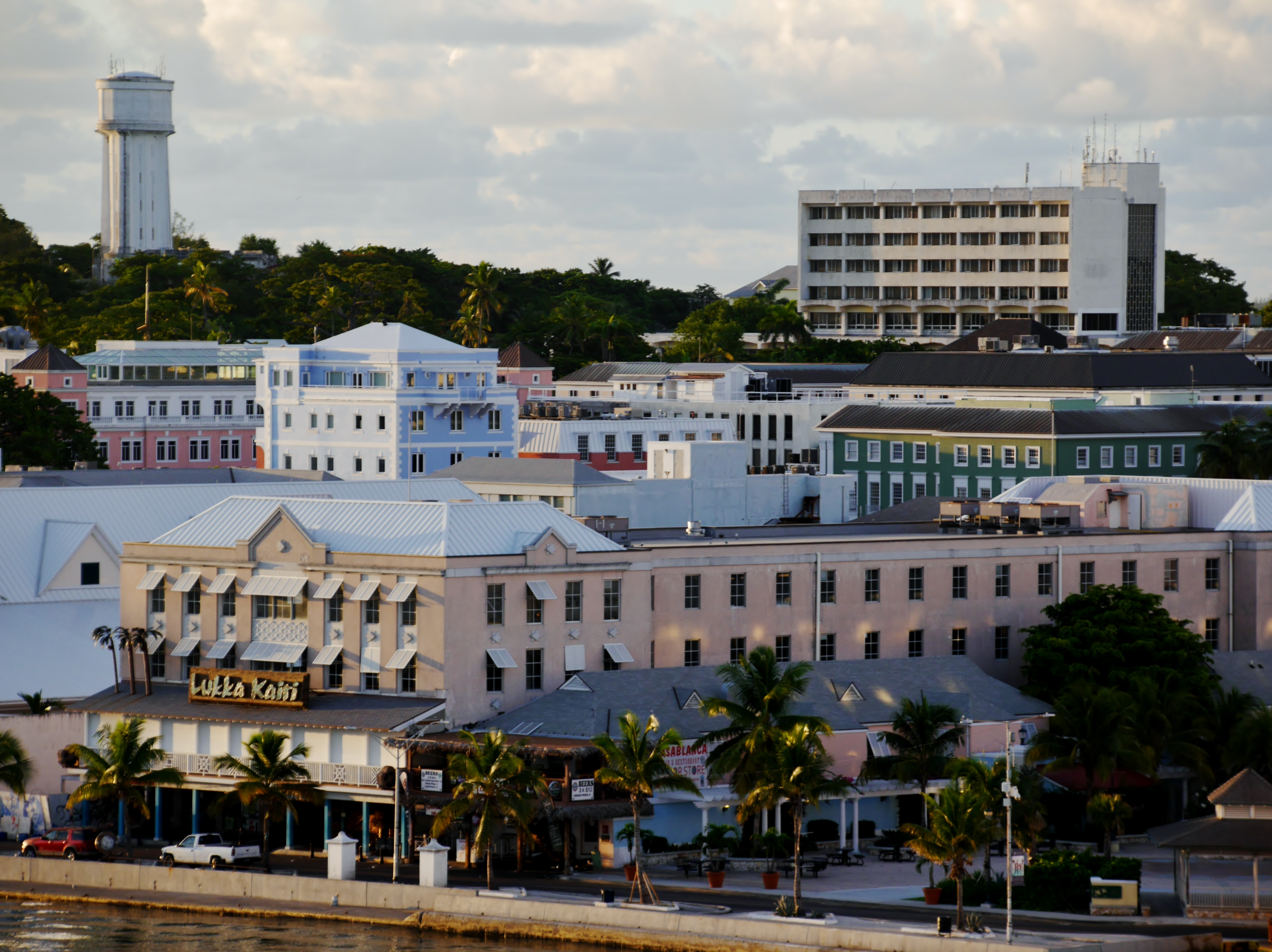
- Nassau is the capital and financial center of the Bahamas.
- Currency: Bahamian dollar (BSD)
- Fiscal year: 1 July - 30 June
- Trade organisations: WTO, CARICOM

Statistics
- GDP: ▲$15.18 billion (nominal; 2025); ▲$16.02 billion (PPP; 2025)
- GDP rank: 142nd (nominal; 2025); 155th (PPP; 2025)
- GDP growth: ▲2.6% (2023); ▲2.0% (2024); ▲1.8% (2025); ▲1.7% (2026f)
- GDP per capita: ▲$36,780 (nominal; 2025); ▲$38,830 (PPP; 2025)
- GDP per capita rank: 28th (nominal; 2025); 56th (PPP; 2025)
- GDP by sector: agriculture: 2.1%, industry: 7.1%, services: 90.8% (2012 est.)
- Inflation (CPI): 2.230% (2018)
- Population below national poverty line: 9.3% (2004)
- Human Development Index: ▲0.805 very high (2018) (60th); N/A IHDI (2018)
- Labour force: 184,000 (2009)
- Labour force by occupation: agriculture 5%, industry 5%, tourism 50%, other services 40% (2005 est.)
- Unemployment: 14.2% (2009 est.)
- Main industries: tourism, banking, cement, oil transshipment, salt, rum, aragonite, pharmaceuticals, spiral-welded steel pipe

External
- Exports: $1.316 billion (2017 est.)
- Export goods: mineral products and salt, animal products, rum, chemicals, fruit and vegetables
- Main export partners: United States 35.5%; Zimbabwe 15.6%; Cote d'Ivoire 13.9%; Germany 8.09%; Guyana 7.84%; Poland 6.32% (2023)
- Imports: $9.097 billion (2017 est.)
- Import goods: machinery and transport equipment, manufactures, chemicals, mineral fuels; food and live animals
- Main import partners: United States 60.4%; Germany 12.7% (2023)

Public finance
- Government debt: $342.6 million (2004 est.)
- Revenue: $1.5 billion (2012)
- Spending: $1.8 billion (2012)
- Economic aid: recipient: $5 million (2004)
- Credit rating: BBB+ (Domestic); BBB+ (Foreign); A- (T&C Assessment) (Standard & Poor's)
- All values, unless otherwise stated, are in US dollars.

The economy of the Bahamas is dependent upon tourism and offshore banking. It is a stable, developing nation in the Lucayan Archipelago, with a population of 391,232 (2016). Steady growth in tourism receipts and a boom in construction of new hotels, resorts, and residences had led to solid GDP growth for many years. The slowdown in the Economy of the United States and the September 11 attacks held back growth in these sectors from 2001 to 2003.

Financial services constitute the second-most important sector of the Bahamian economy, accounting for about 15% of GDP. However, since December 2000, when the government enacted new regulations on the financial sector, many international businesses have left the Bahamas. Manufacturing and agriculture together contribute approximately 10% of GDP and show little growth, despite government incentives for those sectors. Overall growth prospects in the short run rest heavily on the fortunes of the tourism sector, which depends on growth in the United States, the source of more than 80% of the visitors. In addition to tourism and banking, the government supports the development of a "2nd-pillar", e-commerce.

== Sectors of the Bahamian economy ==
The Bahamian economy is almost entirely dependent on tourism and financial services to generate foreign exchange earnings. The Gross Domestic Product (GDP) of the Bahamas is approximately $5.7 billion with tourism accounting for 50%, financial services nearly 20% and the balance spread among retail and wholesale trade, fishing, light manufacturing and agriculture. The European Union lists the Bahamas as one of several Caribbean "uncooperative jurisdictions" because it fails to meet tax fairness and transparency benchmarks.

=== Tourism ===
Tourism alone provides an estimated 51% of the gross domestic product (GDP) and employs about half the Bahamian workforce. In 2016, over 3 million tourists visited the Bahamas, most of whom are from the United States and Canada.

A major contribution to the recent growth in the overall Bahamian economy is Kerzner International's Atlantis Resort and Casino, which took over the former Paradise Island Resort and has provided a much needed boost to the economy. In addition, the opening of Breezes Super Club and Sandals Resort also aided this turnaround. The Bahamian Government also has adopted a proactive approach to courting foreign investors and has conducted major investment missions to the Far East, Europe, Latin America, and Canada. The primary purpose of the trips was to restore the reputation of the Bahamas in these markets.

=== Offshore financial services ===
Financial services constitute the second-most important sector of the Bahamian economy, accounting for up to 17% of GDP, due to the country's status as an offshore financial center. As of December 1998, 418 banks and trust companies have been licensed in the Bahamas. The Bahamas promulgated the International Business Companies (IBC) Act in January 1990 to enhance the country's status as a leading financial center. The Act simplified and reduced the cost of incorporating offshore companies in the Bahamas. Within 9 years, more than 100,000 IBC-type companies had been established. In February 1991, the government also legalized the establishment of Asset Protection Trusts in the Bahamas. In December 2000, partly as a response to appearing the plenary FATF Blacklist, the government enacted a legislative package to better regulate the financial sector, including creation of a Financial Intelligence Unit and enforcement of "know-your-customer" rules. Other initiatives include the enactment of the Foundations Act in 2004 and the planned introduction of legislation to regulate Private Trust Companies. After being later off the blacklist, in December 2020 Bahamas also was taken off the FATF greylist.

=== Agriculture and fisheries ===
Agriculture and fisheries industry together account for 5% of GDP. The Bahamas exports lobster and some fish but does not raise these items commercially. There is no large scale agriculture, and most agricultural products are consumed domestically. The Bahamas imports more than $250 million in foodstuffs per year, representing about 80% of its food consumption. The government aims to expand food production to reduce imports and generate foreign exchange. It actively seeks foreign investment aimed at increasing agricultural exports, particularly specialty food items. The government officially lists beef and pork production and processing, fruits and nuts, dairy production, winter vegetables, and mariculture (shrimp farming) as the areas in which it wishes to encourage foreign investment.

=== Industry ===
The Bahamas has a few notable industrial firms: the Freeport pharmaceutical firm, PharmaChem Technologies (GrandBahama) Ltd. (formerly Syntex); the BORCO oil facility, also in Freeport, which transships oil in the region; the Commonwealth Brewery in Nassau, which produces Heineken, Guinness, and Kalik beers;. Other industries include sun-dried sea salt in Great Inagua, a wet dock facility in Freeport for repair of cruise ships, and mining of aragonite—a type of limestone with several industrial uses—from the sea floor at Ocean Cay. Other smaller but more nimble players in the banking industry include Fidelity Bank (Bahamas) Ltd. (FBB) and Royal Fidelity Merchant Bank & Trust Limited (RFMBT). FBB offers a wide range of innovative banking products including loan products with built-in savings plans. RFMBT is the only merchant bank in the Bahamas and is a joint venture with Royal Bank of Canada. It provides investment products and services and attracts the majority of the corporate business deals in the Bahamas, most recently acting as financial advisor and placement agent for the largest initial public offering (IPO) ever in the Bahamas with the IPO of Commonwealth Brewery, a Heineken subsidiary.

The Hawksbill Creek Agreement established a duty-free zone in Freeport, the Bahamas' second-largest city, with a nearby industrial park to encourage foreign industrial investment. The Hong Kong-based firm, Hutchison Whampoa, has opened a container port in Freeport. The Bahamian Parliament approved legislation in 1993 that extended most Freeport tax and duty exemptions through 2054.

=== Education ===
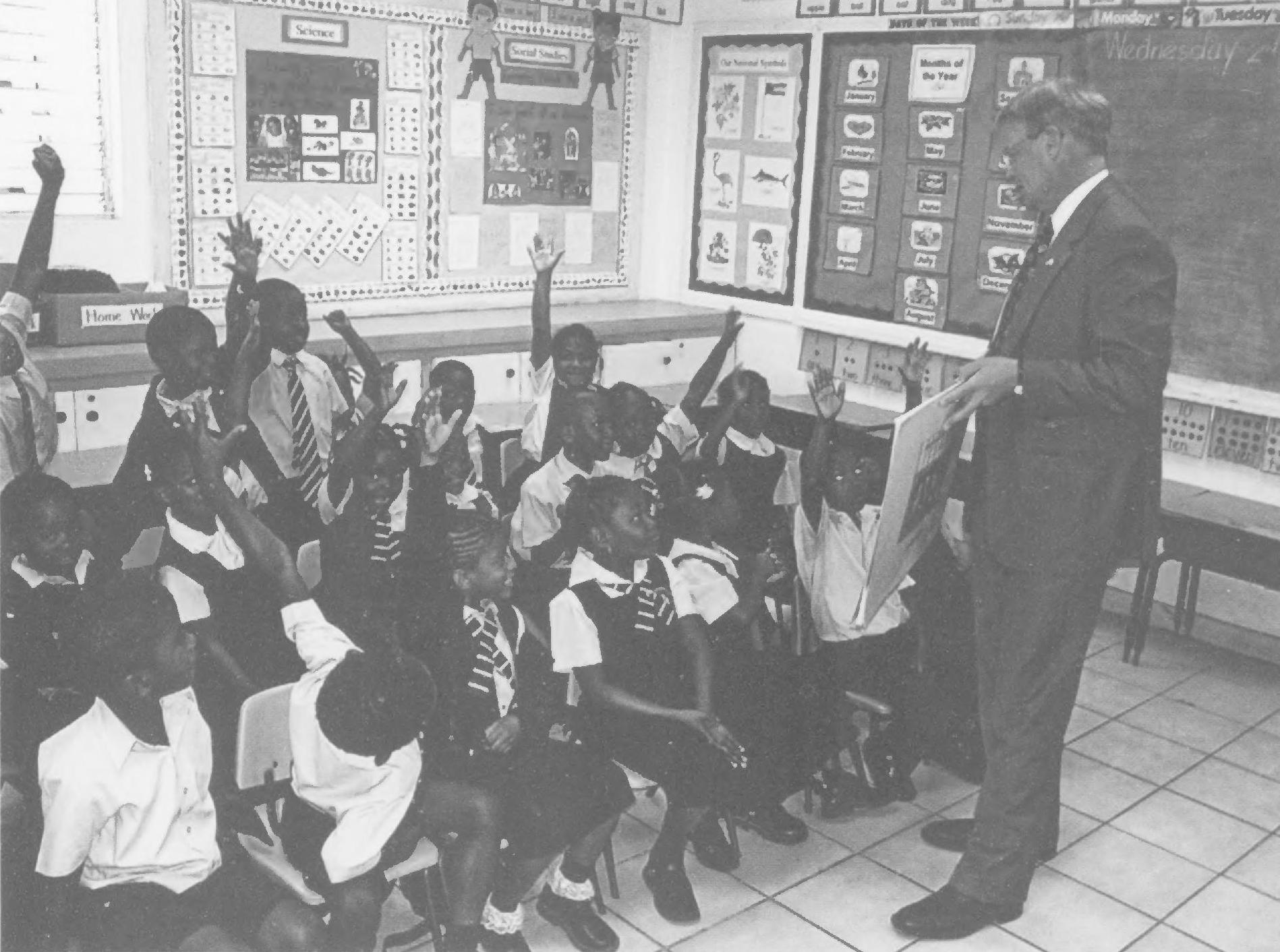
U.S. Ambassador John D. Rood reading to students at Woodcock Primary School in Nassau.

Education in the Bahamas is compulsory between the ages of 5 and 16. As of 2003, the school attendance rate was 92% and the literacy rate was 95.5%. The government fully operates a majority of primary and secondary schools in the Bahamas. The other schools are privately operated. Enrollment for state primary and secondary schools is 50,332, with more than 16,000 students attending private schools. Some public schools lack basic educational materials and are overcrowded. The Bahamas Union of Teachers (BUT) were the ones who acted to create some reform for their weakening education systems. The island has an Education Act that was revised in 1996 and is under control of the Prime Minister.

As of 1996, the Education Act states that education is free for children between the ages of 5 and 16. The University of the Bahamas, established in Nassau in 1974, provides programs leading to bachelors and associate degrees. Several non-Bahamian colleges also offer higher education programs in the Bahamas. Generally, the academic year in the Bahamas goes from late August or early September to late May or early June for primary and secondary schools and late April/early May for college.

=== Healthcare ===
In recent years, the Bahamian healthcare system has expanded its infrastructure and modernized its digital services. New facilities include the Freeport Health Campus on Grand Bahama, which was 30% complete as of late 2026, and ongoing upgrades to Princess Margaret Hospital in Nassau.

Healthcare costs in The Bahamas remain considerably lower than in the United States. For local residents, household out-of-pocket health spending is about 42% of the US level. For international patients, private facilities such as Doctors Hospital offer bundled pricing that is 35 to 40 percent lower than the US average. Still, there are high levels of health and economic inequality and most of the population are unable to obtain private health insurance. Catastrophic spending on healthcare has bankrupted many patients and their families.

== Trade ==
Exports of the Bahamas by product category (2019) Chemical products Transportation Machines Mineral products Plastics and rubbers Metals Foodstuffs Precious metals Textiles Instruments Animal products Vegetable products Paper goods Footwear and headwear Miscellaneous Stone and glass Wood products Animal and vegetable bi-products Animal hides Arts and antiques Weapons

The Bahamian Government maintains the value of the Bahamian dollar on a par with the U.S. dollar. The Bahamas is a beneficiary of the U.S.-Caribbean Basin Trade Partnership Act (CBTPA), Canada's CARIBCAN program, and the European Union's Lome IV Agreement. Although the Bahamas participates in the political aspects of the Caribbean Community (CARICOM), it has not entered into joint economic initiatives with other Caribbean states.

== Taxation ==
The Bahamas has no income tax, corporate tax, capital gains tax, or wealth tax, making it a tax haven for foreign investors. Payroll taxes fund social insurance benefits and amount to 3.9% paid by the employee and 5.9% paid by the employer. In 2010, overall tax revenue was 17.2% of GDP. A value-added tax (VAT) of 7.5% has been levied 1 January 2015. It then increased from 7.5% to 12% effective from 1 July 2018.

== Statistics ==
The following table shows the main economic indicators in 1980–2017.

Year	GDP (bil. US$ PPP)	GDP per capita (US$ PPP)	GDP (bil. US$ nominal)	GDP growth (real)	Inflation (% pa)	Unemployment rate	Government debt (% of GDP)
1980	2.51	11,877	2.60	7.1 %	12.2 %	...	...
1985	3.81	16,296	3.92	4.1 %	4.6 %	...	...
1990	4.99	19,575	5.22	1.1 %	4.6 %	12.0 %	13 %
1995	5.61	20,103	5.65	4.4 %	2.0 %	10.9 %	21 %
2000	7.79	25,722	8.08	5.0 %	1.7 %	7.0 %	19 %
2005	9.50	29,231	9.84	3.4 %	1.8 %	10.2 %	23 %
2006	10.03	30,512	10.17	2.5 %	2.0 %	7.6 %	23 %
2007	10.45	31,398	10.62	1.4 %	2.4 %	7.9 %	23 %
2008	10.41	30,906	10.53	−2.3 %	4.4 %	8.7 %	25 %
2009	10.05	29,501	9.98	−4.2 %	1.7 %	14.2 %	30 %
2010	10.33	29,986	10.10	1.5 %	1.6 %	15.1 %	34 %
2011	10.61	30,452	10.07	0.6 %	3.1 %	15.9 %	35 %
2012	11.14	31,618	10.72	3.1 %	1.9 %	14.4 %	38 %
2013	11.25	31,593	10.40	−0.6 %	0.4 %	15.8 %	44 %
2014	11.31	31,410	11.00	−1.2 %	1.2 %	14.6 %	48 %
2015	11.09	30,435	11.67	−3.1 %	1.9 %	13.4 %	51 %
2016	11.25	30,534	11.75	0.2 %	−0.3 %	12.2 %	53 %
2017	11.60	31,139	12.25	1.3 %	1.4 %	10.1 %	57 %

- Household income or consumption by percentage share—highest 10%: 27% (2000)
- Agriculture - products—citrus, vegetables, poultry
- Electricity - production—2,505 GWh (2007 est.) - Rank 133
- Electricity - consumption—1,793 GWh (2007) - Rank 133
- Oil - consumption—26,830 bbl/d (4,266 m^{3}/d) (2006 est.) - Rank 115
- Oil - exports—transhipments of 29,000 bbl/d (4,600 m^{3}/d) (2003)
- Exchange rate—Bahamian dollar is pegged to the U.S. dollar on a one-to-one basis

The Bahamas has the 47th freest economy in the world according to The Heritage Foundation 2010 Index of Economic Freedom. The Bahamas is ranked 7th out of 29 countries in the South and Central America/Caribbean region, and its overall score is higher than the regional and world averages. Total government spending, including consumption and transfer payments, is relatively low. In the most recent year, government spending was 23.4% of GDP.

== See also ==
- List of companies of the Bahamas
- Bahamas Customs Service
- Ministry of Finance (The Bahamas)
- Economy of the Caribbean
- List of Commonwealth of Nations countries by GDP
- List of Latin American and Caribbean countries by GDP growth
- List of Latin American and Caribbean countries by GDP (nominal)
- List of Latin American and Caribbean countries by GDP (PPP)
