= Canada Border Services Agency =

Canadian agency in charge of border security

Canada Border Services Agency Agence des services frontaliers du Canada
- Badge of the CBSA

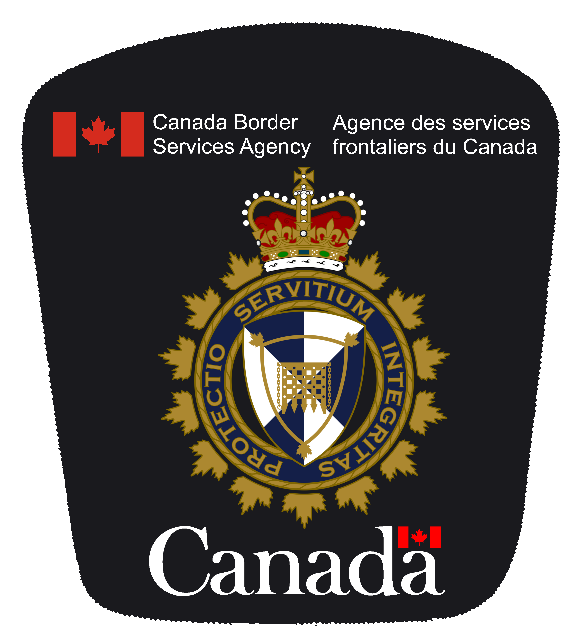
- Shoulder flash of the CBSA

- Coat of arms of the CBSA

- Flag of the CBSA
- Common name: Border Services
- Abbreviation: CBSA (French: ASFC)
- Motto: Protectio Servitium Integritas (Latin for 'Protection, Service, Integrity')

Agency overview
- Formed: 12 December 2003
- Preceding agencies: Canada Customs and Revenue Agency (customs); Citizenship and Immigration Canada (enforcement branch); Canadian Food Inspection Agency (port of entry examination)
- Employees: 17,226
- Annual budget: CA$2.2 billion

Jurisdictional structure
- Federal agency: Canada
- Operations jurisdiction: Canada
- Governing body: Public Safety Canada
- Constituting instruments: Order in Council P.C. 2003–2064; Canada Border Services Agency Act
- General nature: Federal law enforcement

Operational structure
- Headquarters: Ottawa, Ontario
- Elected officer responsible: Gary Anandasangaree, Minister of Public Safety
- Agency executive: Erin O’Gorman, President
- Regions: 8: National Headquarters: Ottawa; Pacific Region: British Columbia & Yukon; Prairie Region: Alberta, Saskatchewan, Manitoba & Northwest Territories; Windsor/St. Clair Region; Niagara/Fort Erie Region; Greater Toronto Region; Northern Ontario Region: Northern Ontario & Nunavut; Quebec Region: Quebec; Atlantic Region: Prince Edward Island, New Brunswick, Nova Scotia, Newfoundland & Labrador

Website
- www.cbsa-asfc.gc.ca

The Canada Border Services Agency (CBSA; French: Agence des services frontaliers du Canada, ASFC) is a federal law enforcement agency that is responsible for border control (i.e. protection and surveillance), immigration enforcement, and customs services in Canada.

Established in 2003 by an order-in-council that amalgamated the customs function of the now-defunct Canada Customs and Revenue Agency, the enforcement function of Citizenship and Immigration Canada (now known as Immigration, Refugees and Citizenship Canada), and the port-of-entry examination function of the Canadian Food Inspection Agency (CFIA). The CBSA's creation was formalized by the Canada Border Services Agency Act, which received Royal assent on 3 November 2005. The CBSA is overseen by Parliament through the Minister of Public Safety and Emergency Preparedness.

The CBSA oversees approximately 1,200 service locations across Canada and 35 in other countries. It employs over 16,500 public servants and offers 24-hour service at 117 of its land border crossings and 10 of the 13 international airports it serves. It works closely with Immigration, Refugees and Citizenship Canada to enforce immigration laws by facilitating the removal of inadmissible individuals from the country and assisting local police in the investigation of violations of the Immigration and Refugee Protection Act. The agency oversees operations at three major sea ports and three CBSA mail centres (CMC), and operates detention facilities, known as immigration holding centres (IHC), in Laval, Quebec; Toronto, Ontario; and Surrey, British Columbia. CBSA's Inland Enforcement team tracks down and removes foreign nationals who are in Canada illegally.

== History ==
Before 2004, border security in Canada was handled by three legacy agencies that performed individual functions:

- Canada Customs and Revenue Agency (CCRA, now defunct), customs;
- Citizenship and Immigration Canada (now IRCC), intelligence and enforcement;
- Canadian Food Inspection Agency (CFIA), food inspection at ports of entry.

The auditor general identified the issues in having the responsibility of border security be divided, such as the inability of individual agencies to share certain security information, as well as ineffective inter-agency communication. Thus, in 2003, the border enforcement functions taken on by the separate agencies would consolidate into a singular organization, titled the Canada Border Services Agency, with Alain Jolicoeur appointed as its inaugural president. Originally, under CCRA, Canada Customs was joined with the country's revenue service, though the agency would primarily give its focus to tax collection. With the establishment of Border Services, CCRA's taxation responsibilities would break off into the Canada Revenue Agency, while its customs function would be absorbed entirely by the CBSA.

The agency has since undergone significant changes to its overall structure, as well as to its range of duties and institutional priorities.

=== Arming officers ===
During its initial years, CBSA officers, just as their CCRA predecessors, were not equipped with firearms. This would be the case until 2006, when the Government of Canada would approve the CBSA Arming Initiative, a 10-year strategy to arm and train Border Services Officers (BSOs).

One of the first significant policy changes to come to the agency was allowing CBSA officers to arrest and detain individuals at the border for non-customs-related violations of Canadian law. These responsibilities would eventually lead to the implementation of use of force policies, after which BSOs across Canada began to carry collapsible batons, pepper spray, and handcuffs, though it would take several years before they could be equipped with firearms. The 2006 Canadian federal budget introduced $101 million to equip BSOs with side arms and to eliminate single-person border crossings. The sidearm of choice is the Beretta Px4 Storm.

==== Implementation ====
In August 2006, Prime Minister Stephen Harper announced that arming BSOs would begin in early 2007 and would continue through 2016, marking the 10-year strategy. Arming of officers at Ports of Entry (POEs) across Canada was conducted systematically, with ports that were considered the busiest and/or most dangerous to be completed first. The first officers to be armed were those working at Ontario's Windsor-Detroit POE, the busiest highway port of entry in Canada.

As of 2019, Border Services Officers at all POEs were issued firearms. However, BSOs working within major airport terminals are not authorized to be armed and must instead store and lock their firearms after finishing their duty.

=== 2021 strike ===
In August 2021, around 8,500 employees of the Agency represented by the Public Service Alliance of Canada and the Customs and Immigration Union went on a work-to-rule strike, just days before COVID-19 restrictions on crossing the Canada–United States border were due to be eased. Having been without a collective bargaining agreement since 2018, the demands of the strike were an increase in salaries to reach equality with other law enforcement officials in Canada, increased protections against harassment and discrimination, as well as the implementation of a policy to allow non-uniformed officials to work from home. An agreement was reached between the workers and the Canadian government in the evening of the same day, ending the strike after one day.

== Operations ==
Operations Rank Structure (low to high)
Position	Insignia	Pay Grade
Enforcement Case Officer	No insignia	FB-01
Officer Trainee	No insignia	FB-02
Border Services Officer (BSO) / Inland Enforcement Officer (usually referred to as Officer)	No insignia	FB-03
Trainer	1 silver stripe	FB-04
Superintendent	2 silver stripes	FB-05
Training Administrator	2 silver stripes	FB-05
Regional Program Manager	3 silver stripes	FB-06
Chief of Operations (commanding officer of a point of entry, either land or airport)	3 silver stripes	FB-07
Training Manager	3 silver stripes	
Assistant Director	4 silver stripes	FB-08
Director (commanding officer of a district: multiple land borders or an airport)	1 gold CBSA pin and 1 gold pip	EX-02
Regional Director General (RDG) (commanding officer of a region, e.g. Pacific Region, Prairie Region)	1 gold CBSA pin and 2 gold pips	EX-03
Vice President (of operations)	1 gold CBSA pin and 3 gold pips	EX-04
President (head of the CBSA)	1 gold CBSA pin and 4 gold pips	EX-05

=== Border Services Officers ===
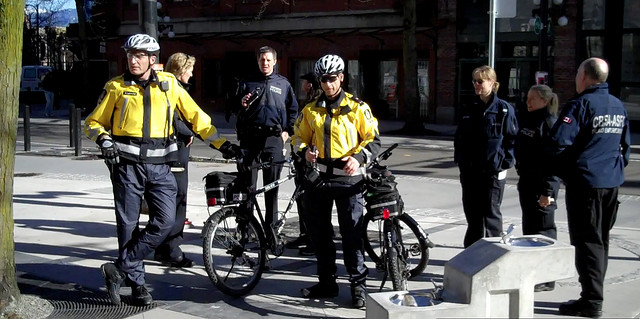
CBSA officers with Vancouver Police in Vancouver, BC

A Border Services Officer (BSO) is a federal law enforcement officer employed by the Canada Border Services Agency. While "Border Services Officer" is the overarching term for the CBSA's front-line personnel, it is not a title derived from legislation. Rather, BSOs receive multiple legislative designations such as "Customs Officer" under the Customs Act; "Immigration Officer" under the Immigration and Refugee Protection Act; and "Screening Officer" under the Quarantine Act. When enforcing customs- or immigration-related legislation, BSOs are Peace Officers under the Criminal Code. However, they can only make arrests for offences under the Criminal Code if they are appointed as "designated officers" by the minister of public safety under the Customs Act (section 163.4) and are at customs offices performing the normal duties of an officer or by Section 99.1 of the Customs Act.

Currently, BSOs are equipped with handcuffs, pepper spray, batons, and Beretta PX4 Storm pistols. The arming initiative began in 2007 and officially concluded in 2016. BSOs are trained at the CBSA College, located in Rigaud, Quebec. The training begins with a 4-week online program called the "Pre-OITP," followed by an 18-week program called the Officer Induction Training Program (OITP), which covers a range of topics from law (such as criminal law, immigration, and customs legislation) to control and defensive tactics.

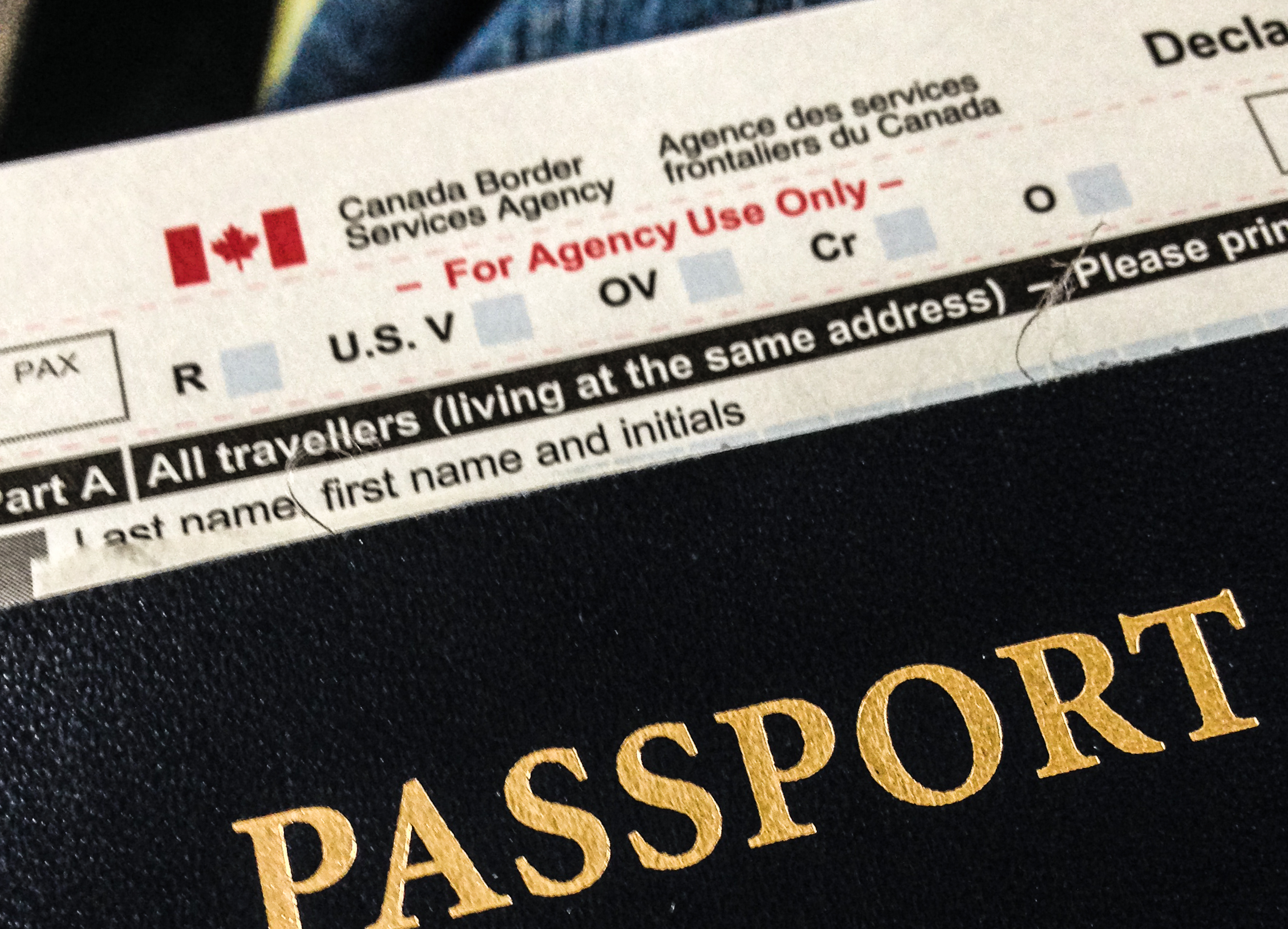
Canadian customs declaration

=== Immigration ===
The CBSA plays a key role in immigration to Canada, as it has assumed the port-of-entry and enforcement mandates formerly held by Citizenship and Immigration Canada. CBSA officers work on the front lines, screening persons entering the country and removing those who are unlawfully in Canada.

As of the end of 2003, there were up to 200,000 illegal immigrants in Canada (most residing in Ontario). Most are refugee claimants whose refugee applications were rejected by the Immigration and Refugee Board of Canada. There are very few illegal immigrants who enter the country without first being examined by the CBSA. The reason for this is that Canada is physically very difficult to get to, except crossing the Canada-US Border. As the US is itself a prime destination for illegal immigrants, not many illegal immigrants then attempt to cross the border into Canada in the wild.

There has been a recent increase in the number of illegal entrants from Saint Pierre and Miquelon who travel in makeshift boats. High unemployment in the French colony has spurred this increase, which has been acknowledged by the Government of France. The CBSA and Royal Canadian Navy are considering increased marine patrols to intercept the illegal migrants. While residents could lawfully travel to France, the expensive airfare has made the relatively short 5.5-nautical-mile (10 km; 6 mi) boat ride to the Canadian province of Newfoundland and Labrador more attractive for destitute economic migrants.

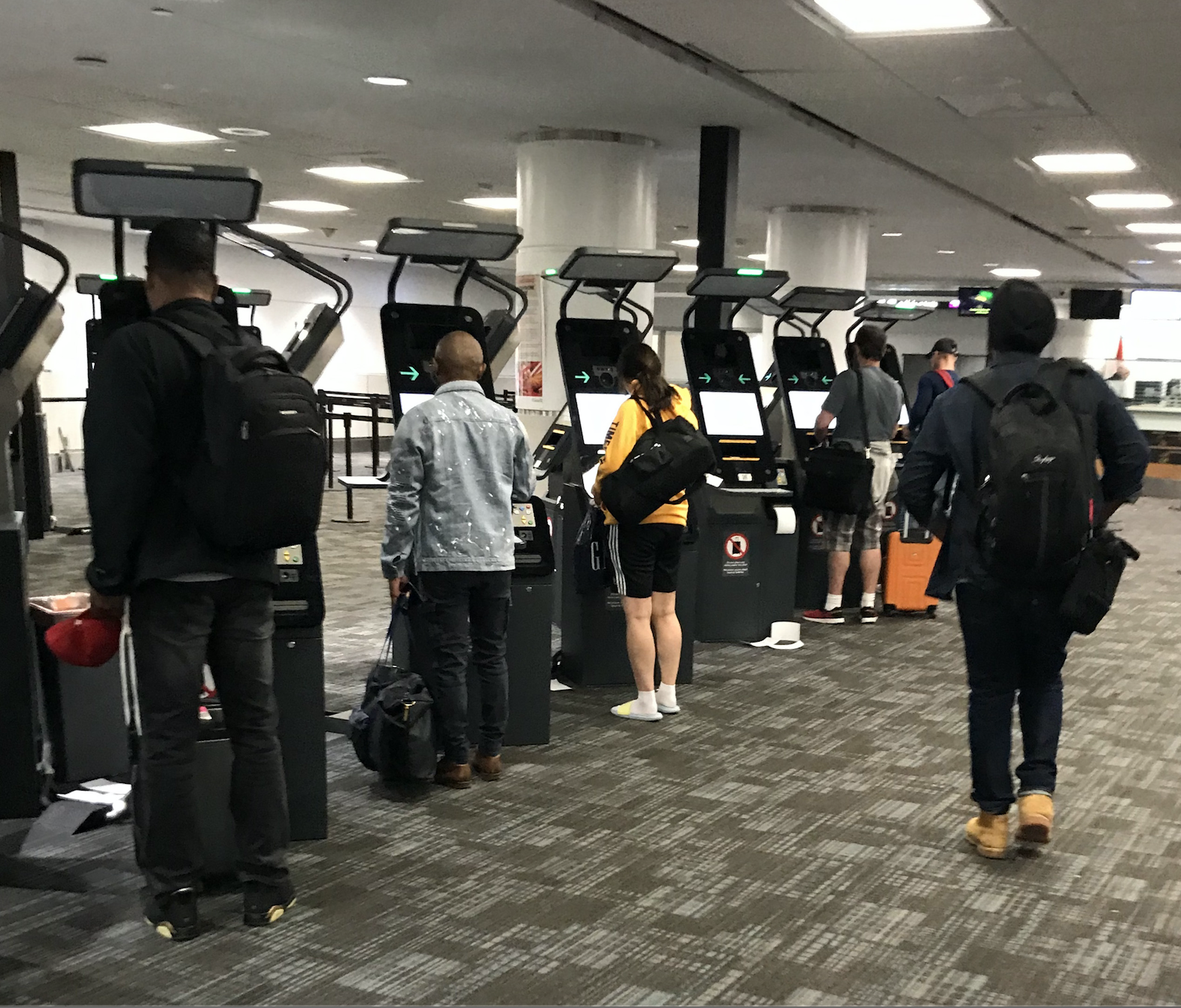
Automated passport control kiosks at Toronto Pearson International Airport

=== Examinations, searches, and seizures ===
All persons and goods entering Canada are subject to examination by CBSA officers. An examination can be as simple as a few questions, but can also include an examination of the subject's vehicle and/or luggage, electronic devices, more intensive questioning, or strip-search. The intensity of an examination depends on the reasonable suspicion that the officer has to escalate the intensity of a search. CBSA Officers must adhere to strict search protocols, guidelines, and procedures during the examination process.

Examinations are performed to ensure compliance with customs and immigration legislation. CBSA officers are given their authority by the Customs Act and the Immigration and Refugee Protection Act (IRPA). In addition, BSOs are also able to enforce other Acts of Parliament as they are designated as Peace Officers under the Criminal Code. The agency will also seize items it labels obscene, as it did in February 2009 when it detained and banned two films by the adult film director Michael Lucas. CBSA's Policy On The Classification Of Obscene Material states that the "ingestion of someone else's urine... with a sexual purpose" makes a film obscene.

In 2000, after a ten-year-long controversy over items the agency labelled obscene, the case reached the British Columbia Supreme Court. One judge in the case concluded not only that Border officials had wrongly delayed, confiscated, destroyed, damaged, prohibited, or misclassified materials imported by the appellant on numerous occasions, but that these errors were caused "by the systemic targeting of Little Sisters' importations in the Vancouver Customs.

=== Enforcement and intelligence ===
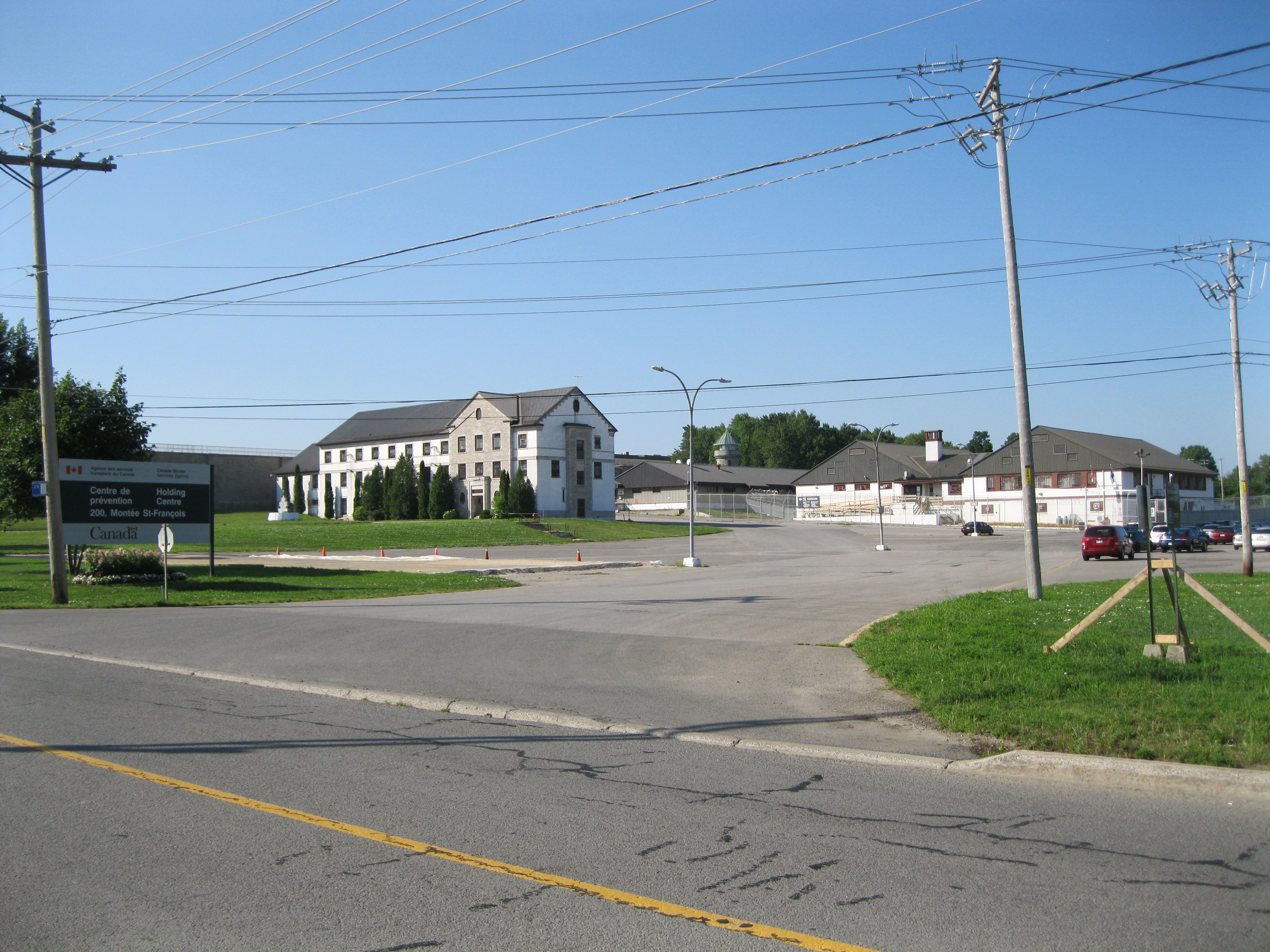
Immigration Holding Centre in Laval, Quebec, one of the three in the country

==== Criminal investigations and prosecutions ====
The Criminal Investigations unit of CBSA is tasked with investigating and pursuing prosecution of those who commit criminal offences against Canada's border legislation. CBSA investigators are responsible for operational activities including:

- Investigation of fraudulent activities related to the importation/exportation of goods and the movement of people;
- Reviewing leads, researching, and gathering evidence;
- Conducting forensic examinations on digital devices and media;
- Execution of search warrants;
- Preparation and serving of documents (e.g., corrective, civil, criminal);
- Assisting foreign customs administrations with their investigation of customs offences (CMAA, MLAT); and
- Criminal prosecutions (preparing Crown Briefs, recommending specific charges, assisting the Public Prosecution Service of Canada).

==== Intelligence ====
CBSA and RCMP members share information on the survey research vessel Strait Hunter, simulating a migrant vessel, during Frontier Sentinel (2012)

The CBSA maintains an intelligence program, which is mandated to provide intelligence support to operational decision-makers at all levels within the Agency. Information is collected from a variety of sources while intelligence officers and analysts are deployed within Canada as well as overseas.

Threat and risk assessments are widely recognized as valuable decision-making tools when setting examination priorities. The agency's intelligence directorate conducts a border risk assessment of its border operations every 2–3 years. Under this process, the agency assesses the risks of smuggling contraband, such as drugs, firearms, proceeds of crime, child pornography, illicit tobacco, etc. The information is assessed and ranked by commodity and by mode of transport. The agency will include the risks of irregular or illegal migration of people, and the movement of food, plants, and animals, now under the agency's broader mandate, in the next version of its border risk assessment.

The agency also prepares a national port risk assessment every two years. The agency assessed the relative risk to 168 ports of entry in 2006 and 220 in 2004. Regional intelligence analysts, in consultation with other sources and port operational staff, complete a questionnaire detailing port demographics, traffic volume, enforcement, and intelligence information. The 2006 risk assessment ranked 23 ports as high-risk and included information on suspected criminal and national security risks, as well as the risk of irregular or illegal migration of people. In addition to the border and port risk assessment processes, the intelligence directorate provides daily, weekly, and monthly updates on specific threats and trends in unlawful activities. Intelligence officers and analysts frequently participate in tactical and operational law enforcement activities such as search warrants, arrests, surveillance, the recruitment and retention of confidential informers, interviews of detainees, and the analysis of seized goods and evidence.

==== Border Watch ====
The CBSA Border Watch toll-free info line offers citizens the opportunity to report suspicious cross-border activity directly to the agency directly and confidentially. The Border Watch line differs from other phone lines for the public, such as CrimeStoppers or the RCMP info line in that it is designed to focus directly on border-related intelligence.

=== Detector Dog Service (DDS) ===
Detector dogs begin training between the ages of 11 and 16 months and work for an average of 8 to 10 years. Several different breeds are used, but the CBSA primarily uses Labrador Retriever for firearm, drug, and currency detection, while using the Beagle for plant, food, and animal detection. Dogs live with their handler full-time. While the dog is at work, it is transported in air-conditioned vehicles that act as a mobile kennel.

The AMPS program, implemented in December 2005, is a system that encourages compliance with customs legislation through the tendering of monetary penalties. It is used mainly as an enforcement tool on technical infractions, where the subject did not necessarily intend to breach the legislation, but failed to comply in some way. For more serious or deliberate infractions, the goods in question may be seized or subject to forfeiture. AMPS penalties are imposed depending on the severity and frequency of the infraction. Multiple infractions will result in higher penalties under the AMPS system. The CBSA's use of detector dogs began with three canine units at the Windsor port of entry in 1978. The program has since expanded to include 69 detector dog teams located at ports across Canada. Detector dogs work in mail, air, land, and marine facilities. Each dog is trained to detect specific commodities and is generally trained to fit into one of four profiles:

- Narcotics, explosives, and firearms;
- Currency;
- Tobacco; or
- Food, plant, and animal (FPA)

==== Role ====
Detector dogs provide BSOs with one of the most effective tools in the detection of contraband. Although other tools are available to BSOs, detector dogs are highly efficient in their ability to accurately locate the source of a scent and thus can save time in labour-intensive examinations of vehicles, luggage, and cargo. This speeds up the process for BSOs as well as for the travelling public. The CBSA uses passive detector dogs, unlike some other law enforcement agencies, which use active dogs. When a passive dog detects a scent that it has been trained to recognize, it sits beside the source of the smell. While active dogs, which bark, scratch, dig, or bite at the source of the scent, were used initially by the CBSA, passive dogs allow the officer to circulate among passengers more peacefully and are considered by the Agency to be more effective in the course of their work. The Passive Dog training was implemented in 1993 and is now the Agency's preference.

==== Training ====
Detector Dog teams (consisting of a dog and a single handler) undergo a 10-week training course at the CBSA Learning Centre. The handlers are Border Services Officers and are trained on how to care for, maintain, and train their dogs. They are also trained to understand the "Cone of Scent;" odour particles always disperse in the shape of a cone: more concentrated at the source, and less concentrated farther away. After the initial training, the handler must keep up a training regimen to ensure their dog remains in top form. Only about 1 in 10 dogs that begin the training eventually become detector dogs.

While there is no specific description for a detector dog, the CBSA looks for certain characteristics that make a better potential detector dog, including:

- Ability and desire to retrieve
- Good physical condition
- Alertness
- Sociability
- Boldness
- Temperament

=== Canada–US cooperation ===
One of the central purposes for the CBSA's creation was to address heightened security concerns after 9/11 and to respond to criticisms that Canada was not doing enough to ensure the security of North America, especially from the United States, which had begun substantial changes years before the 2001 attacks. In the wake of the September 11 attacks on the United States, Canada's border operations had to place enhanced emphasis on national security and public safety. As a result, the United States established the Department of Homeland Security (DHS) led by Secretary Tom Ridge, who would partner with Canada's Deputy Prime Minister at the time, John Manley, to create the bi-national Smart Border Declaration in December 2001. The declaration would provide objectives for cooperation between Canadian-American border operations.

=== Smart Border Declaration and Action Plan ===
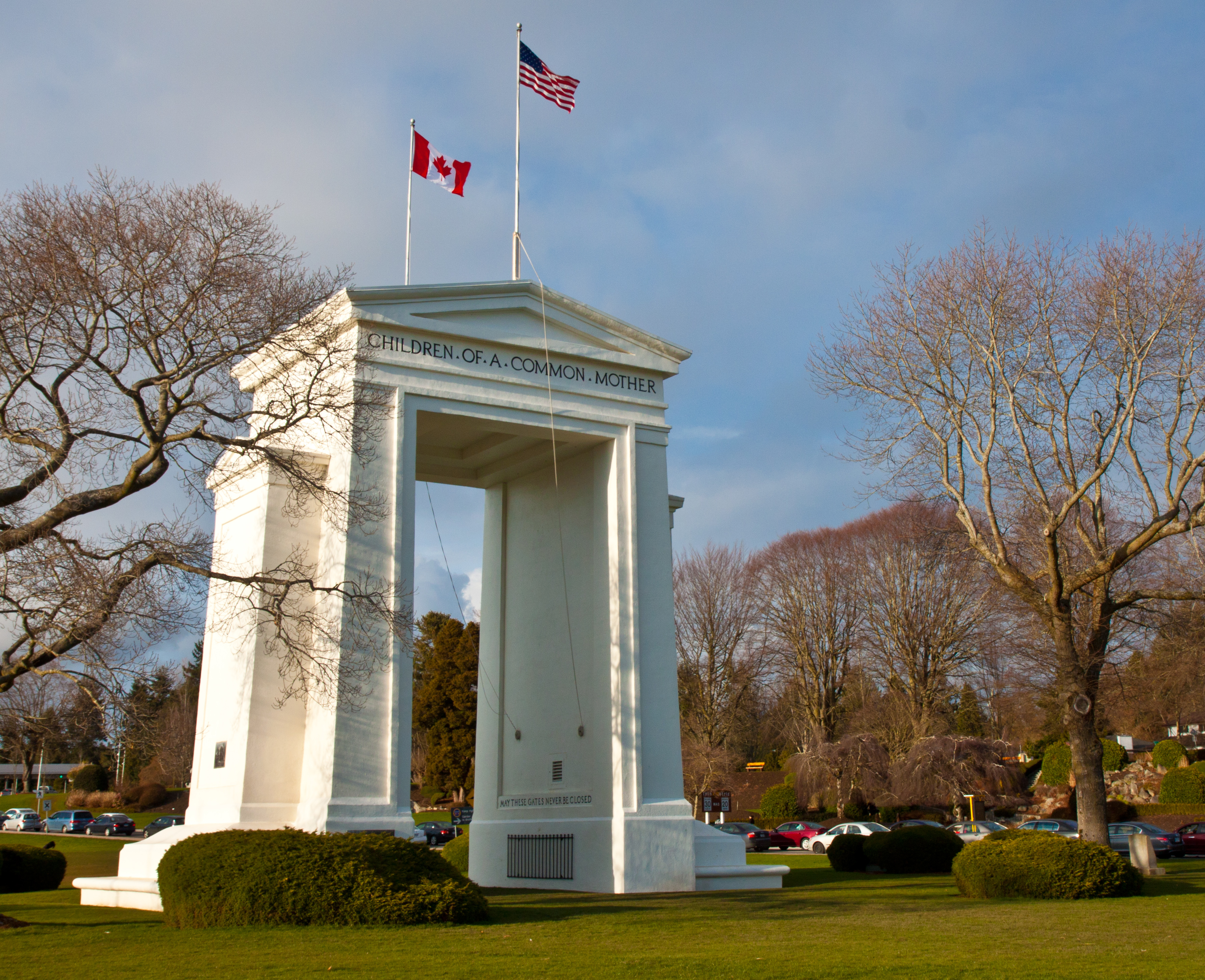
Peace Arch International Park, between Surrey, British Columbia and Blaine, Washington

The Smart Border Declaration and Action Plan, also known as the Smart Border Accord, was signed in 2001 and is an initiative of the Government of Canada—specifically the CBSA, RCMP, and the Department of Foreign Affairs and International Trade— and the United States Government—particularly the Department of Homeland Security (DHS), CBP, and the U.S. Coast Guard. The two major signatories to the Declaration were Canadian Deputy Prime Minister John Manley and then-US Director of Homeland Security Tom Ridge.

The accord was set up to facilitate the cross-border flow of travelers and goods, consisting of 30 points of common interest to improve both security and trade between the two countries. Included in the plan are initiatives to improve the biometric features of Permanent Resident Cards in both Canada and the US, sharing Advanced Passenger Information and creating compatible immigration databases.

There are four main pillars to the Action Plan:

1. Secure flow of people;
2. Secure flow of goods;
3. Investing in secure infrastructure, and
4. Coordination and information sharing in the enforcement of these objectives

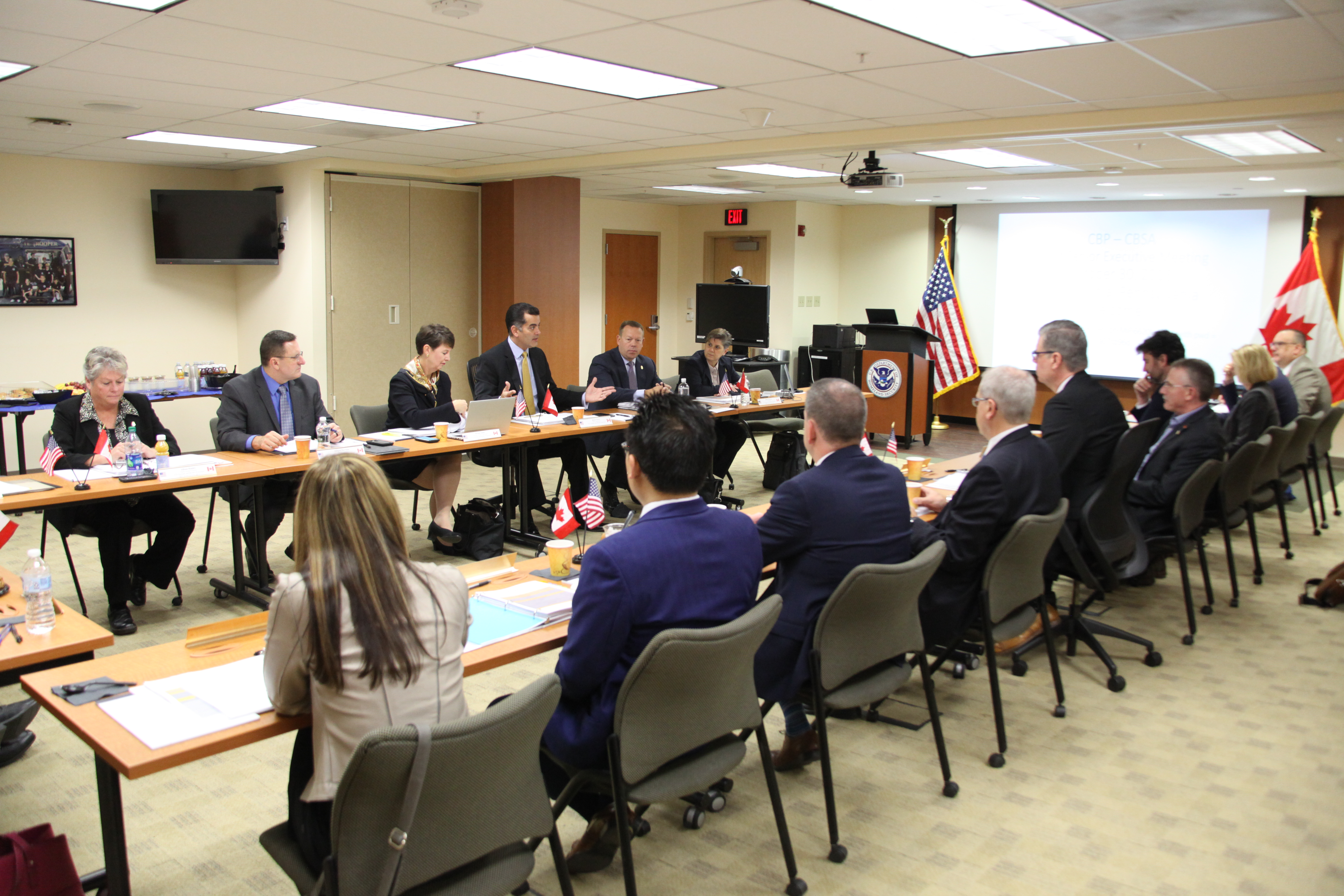
Canadian Border Services Agency leaders meet U.S Customs and Border Protection Officials in October 2018

=== Canada–United States Integrated Border Enforcement Teams ===
Integrated Border Enforcement Teams (IBET) were created as a part of the Accord to consolidate the law-enforcement and intelligence-gathering expertise of different agencies in both countries. The IBET consists of members from the CBSA, RCMP, CBP, U.S. Coast Guard, and U.S. ICE Teams. However, IBETs also enlist the help of other municipal, provincial, and federal agencies on certain projects.

In Canada, IBETs operate in 15 regions across the Canada-U.S. border in air, sea, and land modes. They are based on a model started along the B.C.-Washington state border in 1996. Since their inception, IBETs have helped disrupt smuggling rings involved in the Smuggling of Alcohol, drug trade, Tobacco, grand theft auto, and human trafficking. The Dodge Charger is currently used by the CBSA's Inland Enforcement Program, while the Ford Explorer, the Ford Police Interceptor Sedan, the Dodge Caravan, and the Ford F-250 are used at the port of entry. Other vehicles include the Chevrolet Impala, the Chevrolet Tahoe, the Ford F-350, the Ford E-250, the Dodge RAM, the Chevrolet Silverado, and a Navistar International HV used as the agency's X-RAY truck.

== Organization ==
=== CBSA branches ===
The CBSA has seven regions across Canada, including the Atlantic Region, the Greater Toronto Area Region, the Northern Ontario Region, the Pacific Region, the Prairie Region, the Quebec Region, and the Southern Ontario Region. The Agency consists of nine branches and one group reporting directly to the President.

- CBSA Assessment and Revenue Management
- Chief Transformation Officer
- Commercial & Trade
- Corporate & Finance Management
- Human Resources
- Information, Science and Technology
- Intelligence and Enforcement
- Internal Audit and Program Evaluation (Direct report)
- Strategic Policy
- Travellers

=== CBSA organizational structure ===
Erin O’Gorman was appointed President of the CBSA in July 2022. She served formerly as the Associate Secretary at the Treasury Board of Canada Secretariat from 2018 to 2022 and the Assistant Secretary, Government Position Sector at TBS from 2017 to 2018. She also served as Assistant Deputy Minister at Natural Resources Canada from 2015 to 2017 and Director General of aviation Security at Transport Canada from 2011 to 2015, plus positions with the Privy Council Office as Director of Operations from 2007 to 2010 and as Chief of Staff to the National Security Advisor from 2006 to 2007.

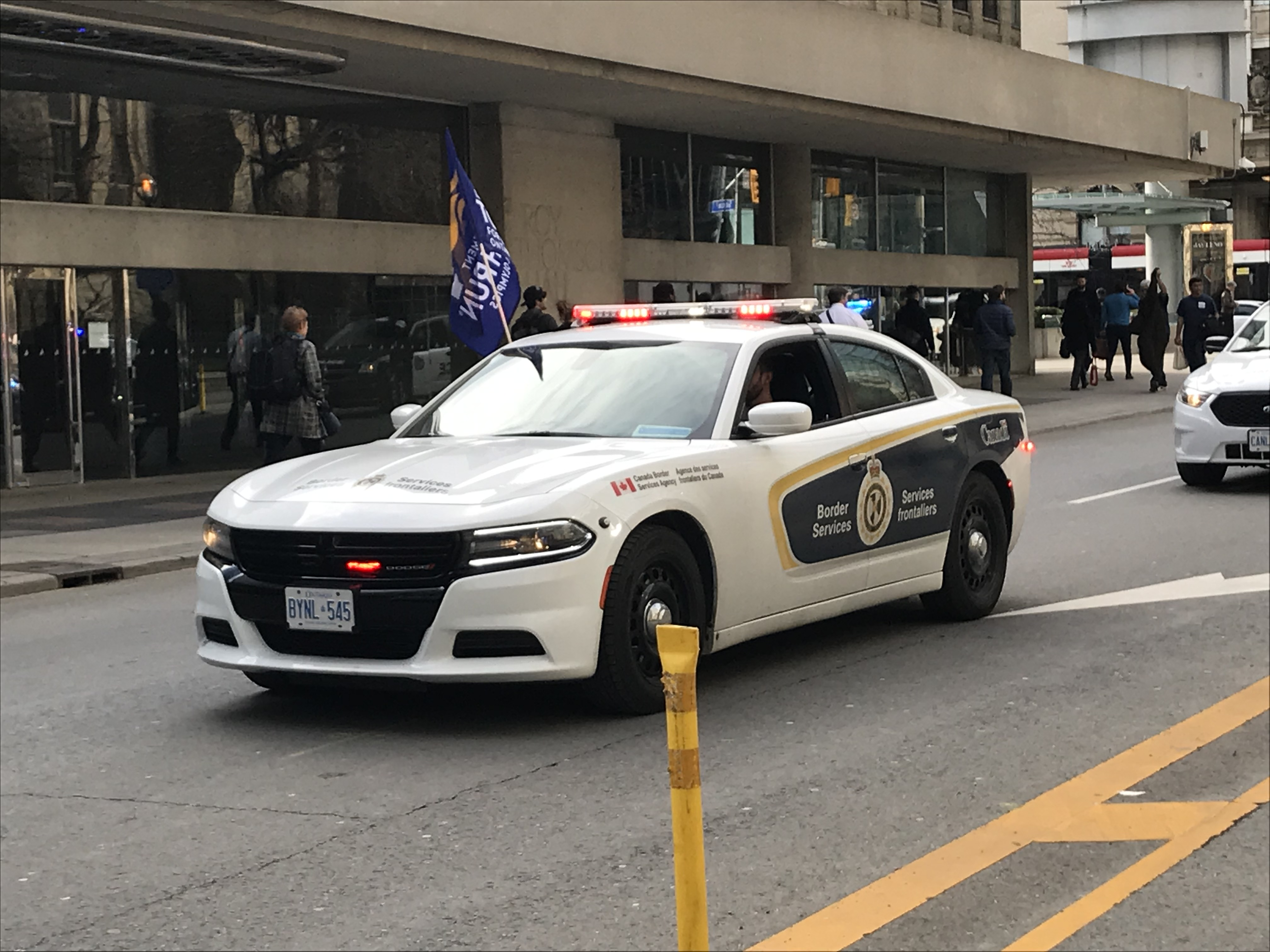
A Dodge Charger in CBSA service

== Insignia ==
In addition to using generic identifiers imposed by the Federal Identity Program (FIP), the CBSA is one of several federal departments (primarily those involved with law enforcement, security, or having a regulatory function) that have been granted heraldic symbols by the Canadian Heraldic Authority.

The coat of arms was granted on June 15, 2010, and presented by Queen Elizabeth II on July 6, 2010. The ceremony was the Queen's last function in her 2010 Canadian Royal Tour. Also in attendance were Governor General Michaëlle Jean and Prime Minister Stephen Harper. Use of the coat of arms is reserved for special occasions, and it is normally associated with the office of the CBSA president. The heraldic badge was approved for use at the same time as the coat of arms. It portrays a gold tressure, which symbolizes the agency's security focus. The portcullis represents His Majesty's agents responsible for border services. The Latin motto Protectio Servitium Integritas translates into English as "Protection, Service, Integrity". The badge figures prominently in the television series Border Security: Canada's Front Line.

A flag was granted by the Canadian Heraldic Authority on December 20, 2012. It is meant to resemble the Canadian Blue Ensign, which was flown on government vessels (including those patrolling Canada's maritime borders) before 1965.

Coat of arms of Canada Border Services Agency
Granted 2010 Armiger Canada Border Services Agency Crest A sparrowhawk close guardant Or its dexter claw supporting an escutcheon per pale Gules and Argent Escutcheon Gyronny of six Azure and Argent a portcullis ensigned by the Royal Crown all within a tressure erablé Or Supporters Two griffins Gules and Or winged Argent standing on a rocky mount proper Motto PROTECTIO • SERVITIUM • INTEGRITAS Banner Azure the Badge, as granted by the Chief Herald of Canada on the 15th day of June 2010, a canton of the National Flag of Canada fimbriated Or Badge An escutcheon gyronny of six Azure and Argent charged with a portcullis within a tressure erablé Or all within an annulus Azure edged with rope, inscribed with the Motto, cotised by demi-maple leaves Or, and ensigned by the Royal Crown proper

== Commerce and trade ==
=== Customs Act ===
Customs Act
- Long title: An Act respecting Customs
- Citation: R.S.C., 1985, c. 1 (2nd Supp.)
- Assented to: 13 February 1986
- Commenced: 1867
- Status: Amended

The Customs Act (1985) is one of the key pieces of legislation governing the CBSA mandate. It was first enacted in 1867 to:

- "ensure the collection of duties;"
- "control the movement of people and goods into and out of Canada;" and
- "protect Canadian industry from real or potential injury caused by the actual or contemplated import of dumped or subsidized goods and by other forms of unfair competition."

Rather than being a taxing statute itself, the Customs Act provides "legislative authority to administer and enforce the collection of duties and taxes that are imposed under separate taxing legislation, such as the Customs Tariff Act, the Excise Tax Act, the Excise Act, and the Special Import Measures Act." The Act was revised in 1986 to allow for greater flexibility in modern transportation, communication, trade, and business practices. Accordingly, since 1986, the Act has been amended several times in response to free trade and other related international agreements.

=== Customs Self Assessment ===
The Customs Self Assessment program gives approved importers a streamlined accounting and paying process for all imported goods. Importers are required to apply for acceptance into the program.

=== Advance Commercial Information ===
Advance Commercial Information (ACI) is a major ongoing project of the CBSA that requires airborne as well as waterborne cargo entering Canada to be registered with the Agency. Assisting officials at seaports and airports in their inspections, the program allows for the tracking of suspicious materials. These phases of the project were implemented in 2005, with a similar highway and rail cargo program to follow shortly. By comparison, ACI is similar to the United States–based Automated Manifest System. The project aims to improve border security and efficiency, and once completely implemented, ACI will require that all commercial cargo entering Canada be electronically registered with the CBSA.

==== History ====
In 2000, then-Minister of National Revenue Martin Cauchon introduced the objectives that would lead to ACI as part of the Customs Action Plan. After the September 11 attacks against the United States, the security benefits associated with the project took on a new importance. In the Canada-US Smart Border Declaration created in December of that year, then-Foreign Affairs Minister John Manley and U.S. Secretary of Homeland Security Tom Ridge called for "a system to collaborate in identifying high-risk goods while expediting the flow of low-risk goods." The idea for ACI was based on the American Container Security Initiative (CSI), which created preclearance rules. With the CSI effectively posting customs officers in foreign ports around the world, Canada was under significant pressure to introduce a similar plan or face the reality that CBP officers would be placed in Canadian ports. As this would be a very visible loss of Canadian sovereignty, the CBSA quickly came up with the ACI plan.

==== Enforcement and implementation ====
Phase 1 of ACI came into effect on 19 April 2004. Data on shipborne cargo must be transmitted to CBSA no later than 24 hours before the loading of the cargo. The data is available to Customs officials at each of Canada's major ports, and any anomalies can be investigated by mobile teams with secure, wireless access to the database. Sensors have also been installed to detect unusual radiation levels in cargo. Phase 2 saw these measures extended to air cargo, and ACI systems were installed in airports across Canada. This phase went into effect in July 2006. ACI Phase 2 also expanded marine requirements to include shipments loaded in the United States. Phase 3 implemented eManifest, which requires the electronic transmission of advance cargo and conveyance information from carriers for all highway and rail shipments. In addition, the electronic transmission of advanced secondary data became required from freight forwarders, and the advanced importer data became a requirement from importers or their brokers.

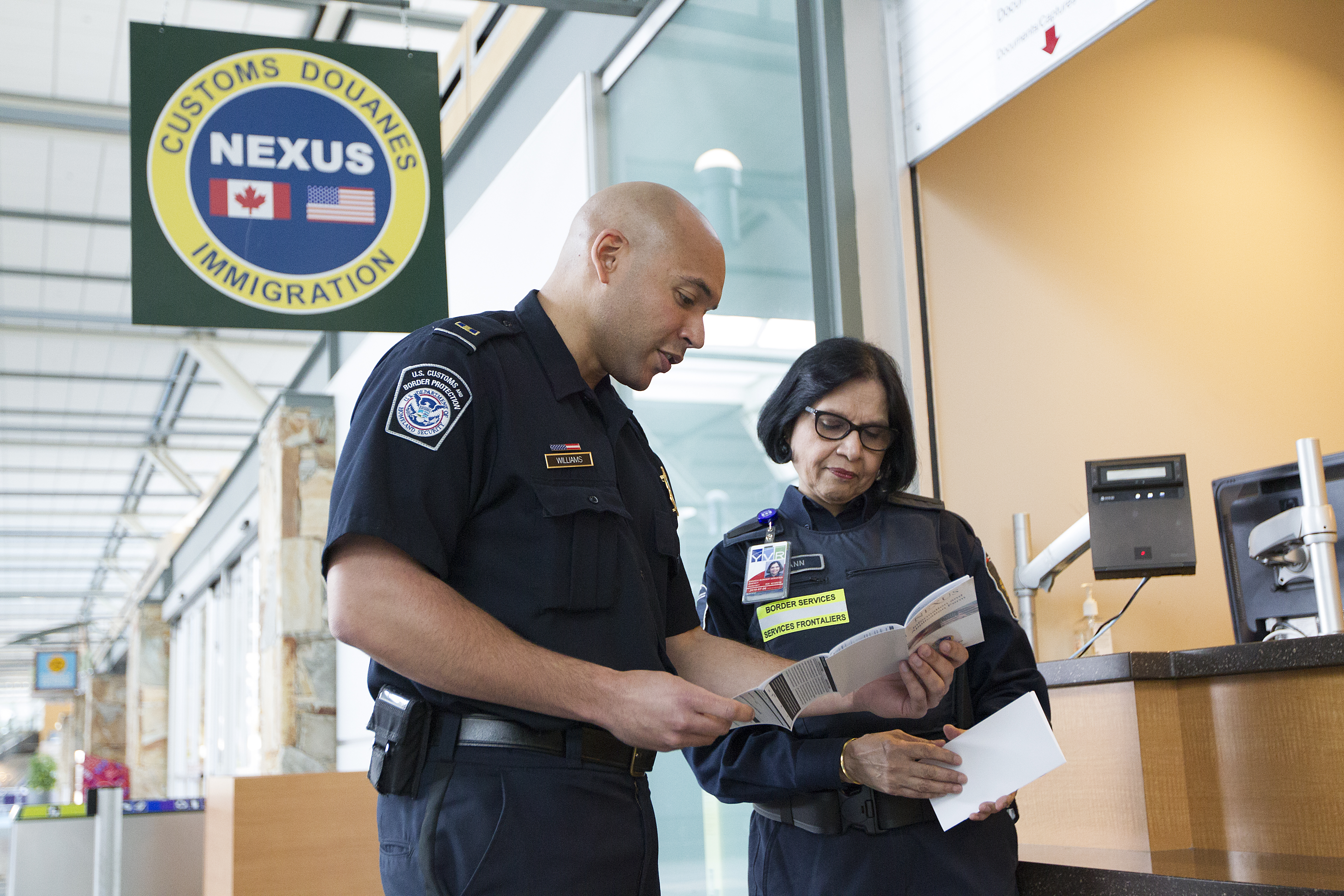
U.S. and Canadian border agents

== Controversies and incidents ==
=== Searching of digital devices ===
Whilst the laws surrounding electronic privacy rights at the border are currently considered unsettled, several new court cases are raising the issue that personal electronic devices (such as cell phones and laptops) should be afforded a higher level of privacy.

In August 2018, the British Columbia Civil Liberties Association (BCCLA) published a guide surrounding searches of electronic devices at the border. The guide was distributed by major media outlets in Canada. The BCCLA guide cautions travellers that Canadian courts have not yet established if searches of electronic devices without suspicion are considered “an unreasonable invasion of privacy”. Travellers crossing the border are advised by the BCCLA to minimize the data that is stored on their devices to mitigate risk.

On November 12, 2019, a federal court in Boston, USA, ruled that the government must have reasonable suspicion of digital contraband before searching electronic devices at U.S. border crossings. The judgment has ignited speculation that Canada should have updated legislation surrounding this area of law.

==== Philippon ====
In March 2015, Alain Philippon, from Ste-Anne-des-Plaines, Quebec, was referred to a secondary inspection after returning from a trip to the Dominican Republic. During the inspection, Philippon refused CBSA officers' request to disclose the password to his phone. Philippon was then charged with hindering an officer's job under section 153.1(b) of the Customs Act, which carries a maximum sentence of twelve months imprisonment and a CA$25,000 fine. Following his arrest, Philippon said that he would fight the charge as he considered his phone to be "personal." His case would receive national and international attention, with several organizations arguing that the right to privacy granted by the Charter could extend to electronic devices at the border, especially in light of recent Supreme Court case law.

In August 2016, Philippon entered a guilty plea and was ordered to pay a CA$500 fine. The plea meant that no Charter challenge was to be raised, thus leaving unanswered the question of whether or not refusing to provide a password to a customs officer is considered hindering.

==== Singh ====
In January 2018, Gurbir Singh, an Indian national studying in Canada, was arrested by CBSA officers and subsequently charged with possession of child pornography. Singh was initially questioned to determine his admissibility into Canada under the Immigration and Refugee Protection Act. After a search of Singh's cell phone revealed a photo suspected to be child pornography, Officer Buechert focused his search exclusively on child pornography. Officer Buechert originally sought to continue his search based on gathering evidence for smuggling charges under the Customs Act, rather than a Criminal Code offense. Upon discovery of illicit images, Officer Buechert contacted the Ontario Provincial Police, who later pressed criminal charges against Singh. Singh was subject to no charges under the Customs Act. Singh contested the inclusion of evidence from the CBSA search on his cell phone, arguing that the broad expansive search powers under the Customs Act would render the administration of justice in disrepute if it was applied to prosecute offenses under the Criminal Code.

On June 18, 2019, the Ontario Court of Justice decided to exclude the evidence against Singh. Justice Deluzio indicated that while broad search and interrogation powers are necessary for the security of Canadian borders, it was inappropriate to abuse such powers solely to further a criminal investigation that was outside the purview of protecting Canadian borders, considering that Singh could not refuse the search or further questioning, nor was a search warrant obtained.

==== Canfield ====
In October 2020, the Alberta Court of Appeal ruled that a federal Customs Act section dealing with the inspection of goods violates the Charter when it comes to searching digital devices. The court found that the Canada Border Services Agency infringed on the rights of two men charged with pornography offences after a search of their cell phones at the Edmonton international airport. It wrote that their rights were violated under s 8 of the Charter of Rights and Freedoms, which says everyone has "the right to be secure against unreasonable search and seizure," and s 10, which specifies rights upon arrest or detention, including the right to consult a lawyer and the right to habeas corpus. The decision is significant because it is one of a handful of cases where a lower court has ever revisited a Supreme Court of Canada decision.

The court also suspended the declaration of invalidity of the relevant section of the Customs Act for one year to provide Parliament with the opportunity to amend the legislation to determine how to address searches of personal electronic devices at the border. Despite the violation of Charter rights, the appeal court decided to allow the inclusion of evidence obtained by CBSA. On March 11, 2021, the Supreme Court of Canada dismissed the applicant's leave to appeal. The court did not provide any additional commentary on the decision.

Crown counsel applied for a six-month extension to the suspension of Customs Act provision. The extension was granted by the Court of Appeal on October 22, 2021. As of May 2022, changes to the Customs Act provision have not been made or implemented. On April 20, 2022 Justices Jo’Anne Strekaf and Ritu Khullar denied the government’s request for a second six-month extension, writing that “public confidence is undermined when a law that has been declared to be unconstitutional continues to have effect in other than extraordinary circumstances.”

==== Reformation ====
On 7 January 2020, Privacy Commissioner Daniel Therrien announced that the Agency had violated the law by carrying out unduly invasive searches of personal digital devices. Therrien filed a recommendation to parliament to have the border agency's guidelines for examination of digital devices written into the Customs Act and says the threshold to trigger a search should be defined in law as "reasonable grounds to suspect" a crime or customs infraction. In response to Therrien's comments, CBSA released a press statement announcing statistics on device searches. Legal analysts have speculated that the numbers released may be inaccurate.

==== Search protocols ====
CBSA policy and protocols for searching electronic devices have changed significantly in recent years in response to the above court cases.

=== Peace Arch Border Crossing incidents ===
In 2010, CBSA Officer Daniel Greenhalgh from BC's Peace Arch border crossing was convicted of sexually assaulting women in three separate incidents after ordering at least four unauthorized strip searches. On October 16, 2012, Andrew Crews, an American, shot CBSA Officer Lori Bowcock in the neck before killing himself. Bowcock survived. This was the first time since CBSA's inception that an officer was shot while on duty.

=== Deaths in custody ===
Since 2000, at least 13 people have died while in the custody of the CBSA and its predecessor, with the two most recent deaths occurring in a week in two separate incidents in March 2016. Following the latest incidents in 2016, several organizations reacted and called for immigration detention reform. The CBSA remains one of the few enforcement agencies in Canada without an independent and external oversight body.

=== TV show ===
Beginning in 2012, the CBSA participated in a TV documentary series produced by Force Four Entertainment and broadcast on National Geographic called Border Security: Canada's Front Line. The show was similar in format to the Australian version, in that it would follow CBSA officers from various ports, as well as Inland Enforcement teams. The show had attracted criticism from the British Columbia Civil Liberties Association and the Canadian Bar Association due to its approach to privacy rights and its one-sided narrative.

In 2013, while filming for the show, the CBSA conducted a raid on a construction site in Vancouver, leading to the arrest of a Mexican national, Oscar Mata Duran. Duran was taken to Immigration detention centres, where he would be presented with a filming consent form. Canada's Privacy Commissioner investigated after receiving a complaint from Duran. The Commissioner found that the CBSA breached Canada's Privacy Act by filming their interaction with Duran before he was advised of the purposes of filming, and found that the coercive nature of being detained in a holding facility would have prevented Duran from providing informed consent for his appearance. The Commissioner lauded Duran as a real hero for lodging the privacy complaint even though he would not personally benefit from it. Duran was deported following the raid. In light of Duran's complaint, the Privacy Commissioner recommended that the CBSA end its participation in the show, after which the CBSA announced that the show would not return for a fourth season. Most of the film locations included Toronto Pearson International Airport, Montréal–Pierre Elliott Trudeau International Airport, Peace Bridge (QEW), BC 15 and BC 99 Peace Arch.

== Legislation and policy ==
=== Independent complaint review commission ===
A report ordered by the federal government in 2017 urged the creation of a new independent oversight committee to monitor, address, and investigate complaints against the CBSA. Currently, CBSA has no independent civilian oversight. It is considered an unusual situation by many provincial law associations, as nearly every policing agency in Canada has some form of independent oversight body. The Liberal government announced in 2019 a budget allocating $24 million over five years to expand the mandate of the Civilian Review and Complaints Commission. The commission will provide service to both RCMP and CBSA. The proposed legislation (Bill C-98) was pending enactment, but did not clear the senate before the end of the parliamentary session in June 2019.

== See also ==
- Royal Canadian Mounted Police
- Visa policy of Canada
- Tourism in Canada
- List of Canada–United States border crossings
- US entry into Canada by land
- NEXUS
- CANPASS
- Passport Canada
- Correctional Service of Canada
- Global Affairs Canada
- US Customs and Border Protection
- UK Visas and Immigration
