= Douglas, Surrey =

Neighbourhood in British Columbia, Canada

Coordinates: 49°00′10″N 122°44′08″W

Douglas is a locality in Surrey, British Columbia, Canada. Just southeast and outside of the boundary of White Rock, it is on the Canadian side of the Peace Arch Border Crossing between British Columbia and Whatcom County, Washington, in the United States. Douglas is the location of the Peace Arch Provincial Park portion of the International Peace Arch Park, which it shares with Peace Arch State Park in Blaine, Washington.

The community is named for Benjamin Douglas, an early pioneer and railroad surveyor.
