= CARIBCAN =

Commonwealth Caribbean Countries Tariff program
- Type: Unilateral economic assistance agreement and programme
- Context: Non-reciprocal market access initiative
- Signed: 1986
- Effective: 1 January 1986
- Condition: Implemented through Customs Tariff Act amendments via Bill C-79 (33rd Parliament, 2nd Session)
- Expiration: December 31, 2033
- Parties: Implementing party: Canada; Beneficiaries: Anguilla; Antigua and Barbuda; Bahamas; Bermuda; Barbados; Belize; British Virgin Islands; Cayman Islands; Dominica; Grenada; Guyana; Jamaica; Montserrat; Saint Kitts and Nevis; Saint Lucia; Saint Vincent and the Grenadines; Saint Kitts and Nevis; Trinidad and Tobago; Turks and Caicos Islands
- Depositary: Parliament of Canada
- Languages: English; French

The Commonwealth Caribbean Countries Tariff program known as ("CARIBCAN") is a Canadian government non-reciprocal economic and trade development assistance programme established under the Customs Tariff Act, in 1986 by the Parliament of Canada. The agreement was created to promote trade, investment and provide industrial cooperation through the preferential access of duty-free goods from the countries of the Commonwealth-Caribbean to the Canadian market. The programme operates with a waiver from the World Trade Organization, which normally prohibits unilateral programmes on preferential market access between countries.

Features of the agreement also include: seminars for businesspersons of the Caribbean region to learn more about developing a market for their products in the Canadian market, a programme to expand exports capabilities by Caribbean businesses and also the assistance of Innovation, Science and Economic Development Canada in the Caribbean region for regional trade commissioners with the aim of trade promotion efforts to the Canadian market.

According to the Global Affairs Canada: the "CARIBCAN's basic objectives, then, are to enhance the Commonwealth Caribbean's existing trade and export earnings; improve the trade and economic development prospects of the region; promote new investment opportunities; and encourage enhanced economic integration and cooperation within the region."

Exempted items

The CARIBCAN agreement does not cover duty-free access for the following items:

- footwear,
- luggage and handbags,
- leather garments, and
- lubricating oils

Other items are eligible for duty-free status if they can be certified as being either grown, manufactured or produced within the Commonwealth-Caribbean or Canada. The definition to be designated as Caribbean as its origin is; 'having a minimum input of 60 percent of the ex-factory price of the goods (including overhead and reasonable profits) originating within any of the Commonwealth Caribbean countries (or Canada). The goods must also be exported directly from the Caribbean to Canada with no other work carried out at foreign transshipment points.

Countries covered under CARIBCAN

- Canada -- Anguilla, Antigua and Barbuda, the Bahamas, Bermuda, Barbados, Belize, the British Virgin Islands, the Cayman Islands, The Commonwealth of Dominica, Grenada, the Co-operative Republic of Guyana, Jamaica, Montserrat, Saint Kitts and Nevis, Saint Lucia, Saint Vincent and the Grenadines, the Republic of Trinidad and Tobago, and the Turks and Caicos Islands.

== Impact ==
Research in 1992 indicated that CARIBCAN, Canada's preferential trade agreement with the Commonwealth Caribbean, had limited success in significantly expanding trade between the two regions. While Canada had historically been a key trading partner for the West Indies, its share of Caribbean exports and imports had declined over the decades due to factors such as trade barriers, import substitution policies, and shifting economic priorities. Although CARIBCAN, established in 1986, provided duty-free access for most Caribbean products, it had not significantly increased trade volumes or encouraged diversification beyond traditional commodities. The agreement faced criticism for excluding key labour-intensive industries such as textiles and footwear, though Canada had made some adjustments in response. By 1992, Canadian exports to the region remained largely concentrated in agricultural and resource-based goods, with Jamaica, Trinidad and Tobago, and the Bahamas as the primary trading partners. Despite CARIBCAN's modest impact on trade, Canada continued to have a strong presence in the Caribbean, primarily through tourism, investment, and development aid rather than merchandise trade.

== Future ==
In 2023, Canada announced that the Commonwealth Caribbean Countries Tariff program (CCCT) would be expanded to include textiles and apparel products, which took effect on January 1, 2025.

The World Trade Organization provided approval for CARIBCAN to be extended until December 2033.

The programme was originally slated to be replaced by a full composite Free Trade Agreement between CARICOM members and Canada, with reciprocal equal access for Canadian companies to the Caribbean market as well, but negotiations were abandoned in May 2015 with no plans to restart.

== See also ==
- Canada-Caribbean relations
- Department of Foreign Affairs and International Trade (Canada)
- The Caribbean Basin Trade and Partnership Act - Involving the United States, Commonwealth Caribbean, Aruba, Costa Rica, the Dominican Republic, El Salvador, Guatemala, Haiti, Honduras, the Netherlands Antilles, Nicaragua, and Panama.
- United States: Caribbean Basin Economic Recovery Act or Caribbean Basin Initiative (CBI)
- European Union: Lomé Convention (succeeded by the Cotonou Agreement)
