= Peace Arch Border Crossing =

Border crossing between Canada and the United States

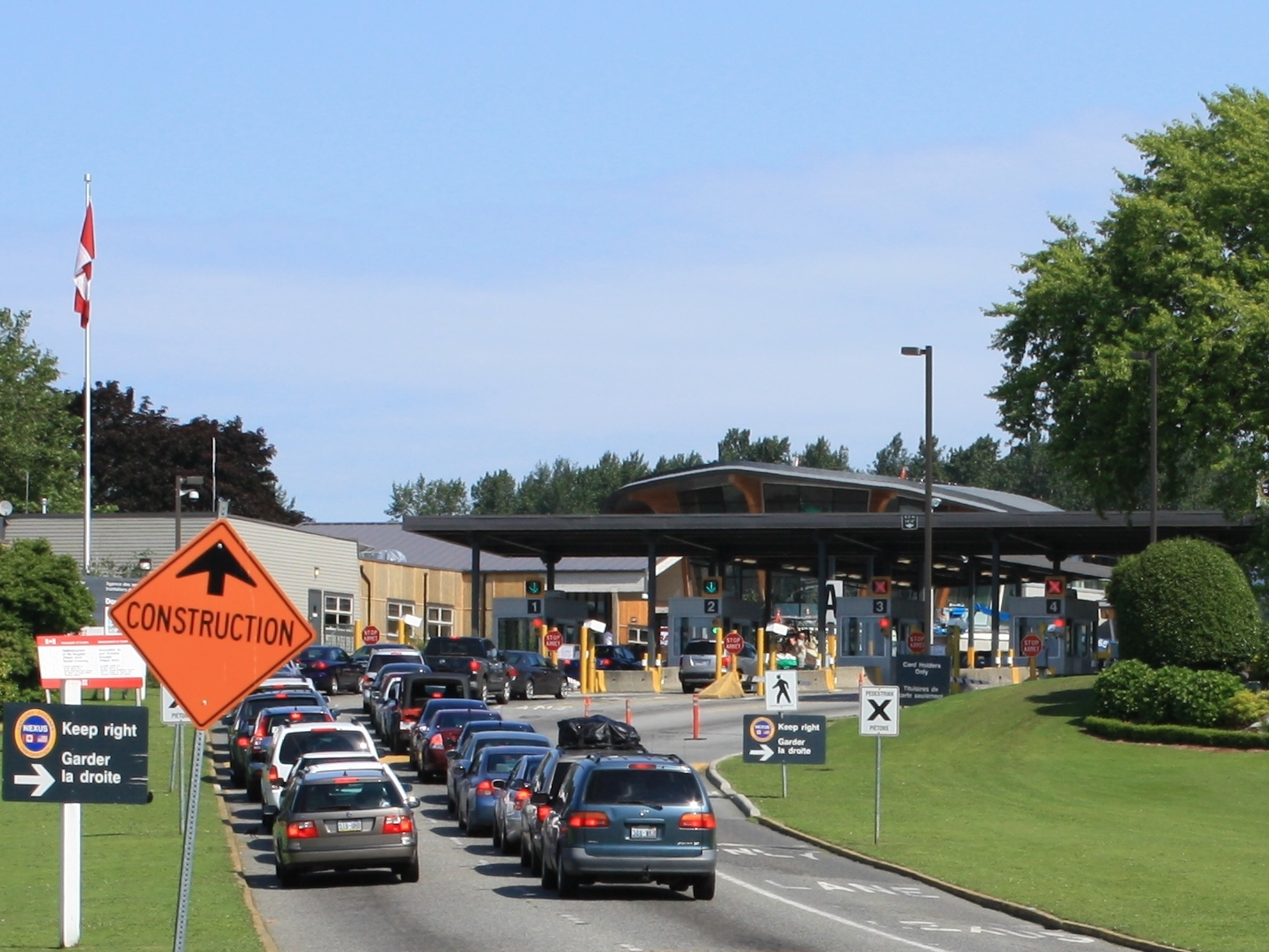
- The Canada Border Inspection Station at the Peace Arch Border Crossing

Location
- Country: United States; Canada
- Location: I-5 / Highway 99 at Peace Arch Park; US Port: 100 Peace Portal Drive, Blaine, WA 98230; Canadian Port: 220 Highway 99, Surrey, BC V3S 9N7
- Coordinates: 49°00′00.4″N 122°45′15.8″W

Details
- Opened: 1891

Website
- US Canadian

The Peace Arch Border Crossing is the common name for the Blaine–Douglas crossing which connects the cities of Blaine, Washington and Surrey, British Columbia on the Canada–United States border. I-5 on the American side joins BC Highway 99 on the Canadian side. Being the most direct route between the major cities of Seattle, Washington and Vancouver, British Columbia, the crossing is the third-busiest on the border with up to 4,800 cars a day. Trucks and other commercial vehicles are prohibited from this location and use the Pacific Highway Border Crossing, which is 1 mile (1.6 km) eastward.

== Canadian side ==
In 1882, the initial border station was established at Elgin on the Nicomekl River about 9 kilometres (6 mi) northwest of the present crossing. The river was the only route for vessels serving the area. When the Semiahmoo Trail opened for vehicular traffic, a New Westminster–Blaine stage service was established. The opening of the New Westminster and Southern Railway in 1891 relocated the border station to a site at Douglas about 300 metres (984 ft) west of the present Pacific Highway Border Crossing. The customs office was in the train station.

When the Great Northern Railway relocated its track via White Rock in 1909, the border station moved westward to the present location near the foreshore. The Port of White Rock provided administrative customs oversight. Oversight passed to New Westminster in 1927 and then to the Port of Pacific Highway in 1932. Canada built a large wooden border station in 1929, being replaced by a concrete structure in 1952. Enlargements were made in 1963. The present facility, which opened in 2009, included an increase in the number of lanes from seven to ten.

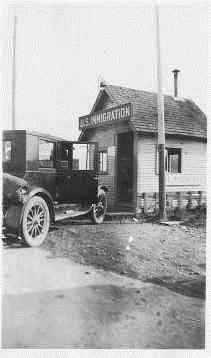
US Immigration Office, Blaine, 1918.

== Peace Arch Park ==
Between the two border stations sits the Peace Arch Park, where visitors are free to cross the border within the confines of the park due to the Treaty of Ghent. The Peace Arch was erected in 1921 when a hotel and residences occupied much of the later park area. In 2010, the only time the Olympic torch left Canada was in crossing the border into the US side of the park.

== US side ==
The original 1920s-era brick building underwent a major rebuild in 1979. The General Services Administration constructed the new state-of-the-art facility which opened in 2010 but was officially dedicated the next year. Wait times can be up to four hours; traffic lights exist on the southbound lane, with timers showing when the light will turn green so drivers can turn off engines.

A new station was built and completed in 2010.

== Trains ==
Until June 2026, border Agents from the Peace Arch Border Crossing met Amtrak Cascades southbound trains to process declarations and finalize passengers' admission to the United States. This process has since been eliminated due to a new border preclearance facility opening at Pacific Central Station in Vancouver.

== See also ==
- List of Canada–United States border crossings
