= Freeport Container Port =

Coordinates: 26.531°N 78.767°W

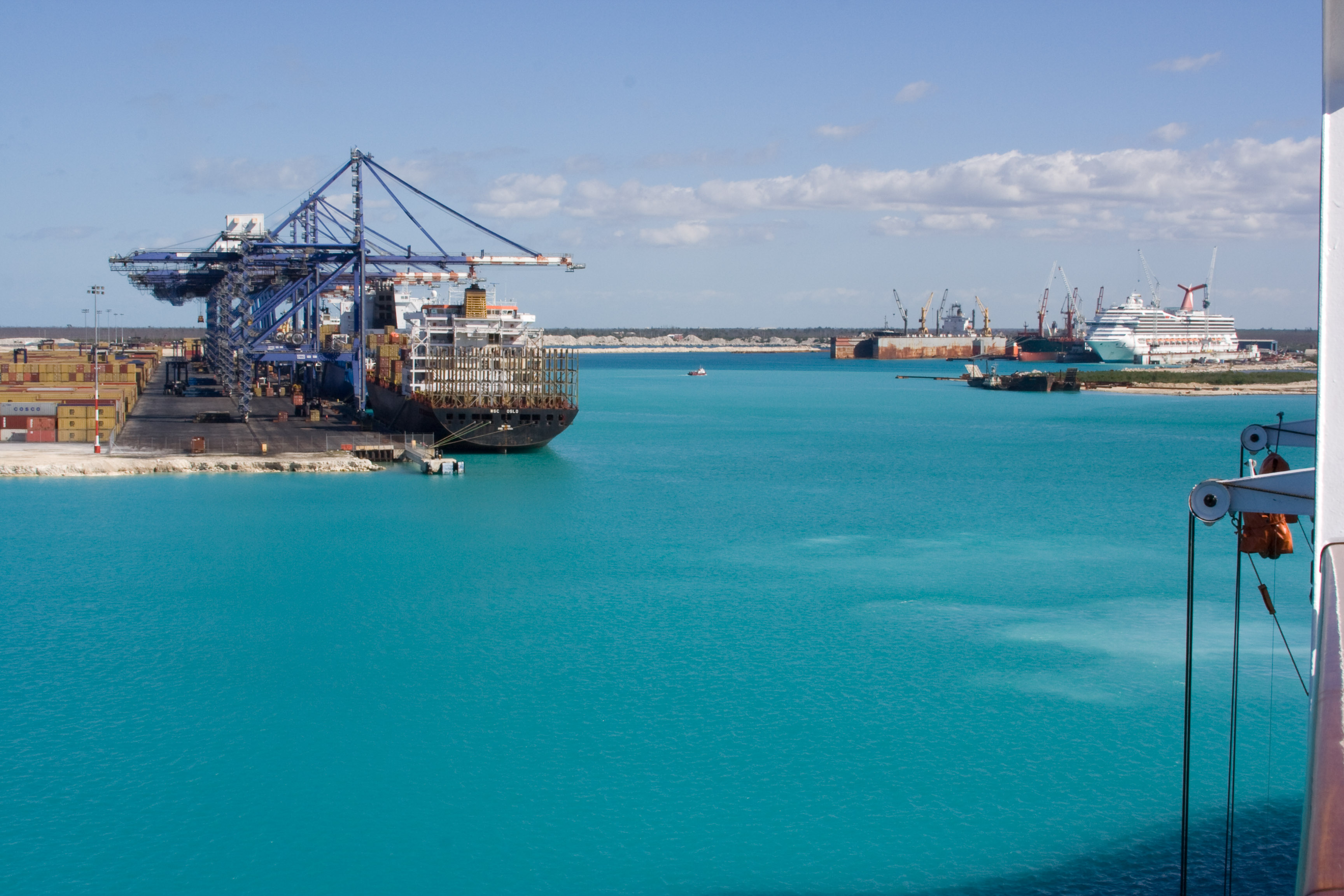
- Container ship MSC Oslo in port
- Interactive map of Freeport Container Port

Location
- Country: The Bahamas
- Location: Freeport Container Port Road, Wild Goose Town, Grand Bahama
- UN/LOCODE: BSFPO

Details
- Opened: 1997; 29 years ago
- Owned by: Freeport Container Port Company
- Type of Harbor: Container port
- Size: 72 hectares
- No. of berths: 3
- Draft depth: 16.1 metres (52 ft 10 in)

Statistics
- Website freeportcontainerport.com

The Freeport Container Port (FCP) is a major container port in Grand Bahama, The Bahamas, located just west of Freeport. FCP is owned and operated by Hutchison Port Holdings, and opened on July 16, 1997. Since then, Freeport Container Port has become a major transshipment hub in the Western Hemisphere, earning the nickname "Transshipment Hub of The Americas." Freeport Container Port can handle bulk, container, general cargo, passenger, tanker, gas, roro, and reefer cargo, and its UN/LOCODE is BSFPO.

Freeport Container Port covers a 72-hectare (180-acre) area with docks stretching 1,037 metres (3,402 ft) and a draught of about 16.1 metres (52 ft 10 in). FCP can handle ships up to 16,100 TEUs, and is equipped with three berths averaging 15 metres (49 ft) in depth. Furthermore, FCP handles approximately 1.1 million TEUs annually, and includes 755 reefer plugs. The port's machinery includes six mobile cranes, four floating cranes, and lifts capable of handling weights between 50 and 100 tons.

In January 2023, Prime Minister Philip Davis prevailed on the FCP to reverse its decision to lay off twenty employees. Regarding the potential layoffs, Foreign Affairs Minister and Progressive Liberal Party (PLP) Chairman Fred Mitchell said that "We cannot afford for the city of Freeport to fail. It's too big to fail and so anything which causes anything for Freeport to not succeed we have to be energetic to deal with it."
