= Customs Tariff Act =

Act of Parliament of Canada regulating tariffs

Parliament of Canada
- Long title: An Act respecting the imposition of duties of customs and other charges, to give effect to the International Convention on the Harmonized Commodity Description and Coding System, to provide relief against the imposition of certain duties of customs or other charges, to provide for other related matters and to amend or repeal certain Acts in consequence thereof
- Citation: S.C. 1997, c. 36
- Royal assent: December 8, 1997

Related legislation
- Customs Act
- Status: Current legislation

The Customs Tariff Act is a Canadian Act of Parliament regulating the implementation of tariffs and export duties by Canada with respect to trade, whether it is covered by an individual free trade agreement made by Canada and another country or trade outside of an agreement, countries designated as least-developed countries, and all other countries.

The Act gives powers to the Government of Canada's Minister of Finance to impose tariffs and duties on goods imported into Canada. Tariffs and duties therefore do not require separate Acts of Parliament. Those tariffs and duties are administered under the Canadian Customs Act by the Canada Border Services Agency (CBSA). The CBSA collects all such revenues on behalf of the Government of Canada.

The Act also gives legal authority to the various trade and free trade agreements entered into by Canada. Each free trade agreement is covered by a specific Act of Parliament, and its implementation and administration is then added to the schedules under this Act.

The Customs Tariff Act is the law that establishes this schedule and provides the legal framework for its implementation. The Customs Tariff is the schedule of taxes (duties) imposed on imported goods, and the applicable tariff treatment (based upon country of origin) to be applied.

== Tariff treatments ==
Canada has concluded trade agreements with many countries, specifying tariffs and importation limits of various goods. Each trade agreement has created a separate treatment of tariffs and trade. Canada has also designated countries with statuses, such as 'Most-Favoured-Nation', 'Preferential' or 'Least Developed Country.'

As of the 2024 revision of the Act, the following are the tariff treatments administered by the CBSA:

- General Tariff for goods imported from countries not listed under other categories (subsection 29),
- Goods from countries that have 'Most-Favoured-Nation Tariff' status (Subsection 30-32),
- Goods from countries that have 'General Preferential Tariff' or 'General Preferential Tariff Plus' status (subsections 33-36),
- Goods from countries with 'Least Developed Country Tariff' status (subsection 37),
- Goods from countries with 'Commonwealth Caribbean Countries Tariff' status (subsections 41-43),
- Goods from countries with 'Australia Tariff and New Zealand Tariff' status (subsection 44),
- Goods from countries with 'United States Tariff and Mexico Tariff' status (subsection 45)
- Goods from countries with 'Chile Tariff' status (subsections 46-48)
- Goods from countries with 'Colombia Tariff' status (subsection 49.01)
- Goods from countries with 'Costa Rica Tariff' status (subsection 49.1)
- Goods from countries with 'Panama Tariff' status (subsection 49.41),
- Goods from countries with 'Peru Tariff' status (subsection 49.5),
- Goods from countries with 'Honduras Tariff' status (subsection 49.6),
- Goods from countries with 'Korea Tariff' status (subsection 49.7),
- Goods from countries with 'Canada–European Union Tariff' status (subsection 49.8),
- Goods from countries with 'United Kingdom Tariff' status (subsection 49.92),
- Goods from countries with 'Canada–Israel Agreement Tariff' status (subsection 50),
- Goods from countries with 'Iceland Tariff' status (subsection 49.41),
- Goods from countries with 'Norway Tariff' status (subsection 49.41),
- Goods from countries with 'Switzerland–Liechtenstein Tariff' status (subsection 52.3),
- Goods from countries with 'Jordan Tariff' status (subsection 52.4),
- Goods from countries with 'Ukraine Tariff' status (subsection 52.5), and
- Goods from countries with 'Comprehensive and Progressive Trans-Pacific Partnership Tariff' status (subsection 52.6)
  - This includes Australia, Brunei, Chile, Japan, Malaysia, Mexico, New Zealand, Peru, Singapore, and Vietnam.

Source: Customs Tariff, Government of Canada

=== Countries ===
The countries and their tariff treatments applicable is published by the CBSA under Schedule T2025. Most countries have Most-Favoured-Nation status. As of 2025, there are two notable exceptions: Belarus and Russia, under measures applied after the invasion of Ukraine.

== Special measures ==
Division 4 of the Act gives powers to the Minister, along with the Minister of Foreign Affairs, to make special orders regarding trade and tariffs, "for the purpose of enforcing Canada’s rights under a trade agreement in relation to a country or of responding to acts, policies or practices of the government of a country that adversely affect, or lead directly or indirectly to adverse effects on, trade in goods or services of Canada". These include:

- "suspend or withdraw rights or privileges granted by Canada to any country under a trade agreement or Act of Parliament",
- add a surtax to goods or a class of goods,
- modify the Import Control List of imported products, and
- charge a separate tariff for products imported in excess of a trade agreement.

Source: Customs Tariff, Government of Canada

The Government can also levy a special surtax as an Emergency Measure if goods are being dumped into Canada at a rate that would damage local producers.(subsections 54-67)

The Government can also levy a special surtax as an Safeguard Measure for Agricultural Goods under the World Trade Organization's Agreement on Agriculture.(subsection 68)

== Duty-free regulations ==
In sub-section 89, the Act also defines when goods can be imported into Canada duty-free, such as:

- goods imported by travellers, up to defined dollar limits
- goods imported into Canada and then exported
- goods imported into Canada for the production of goods that are exported
- goods returning to Canada after being repaired abroad.

Source: Customs Tariff, Government of Canada
