= Peace Arch Park =

Park straddling the US-Canada border's western terminus

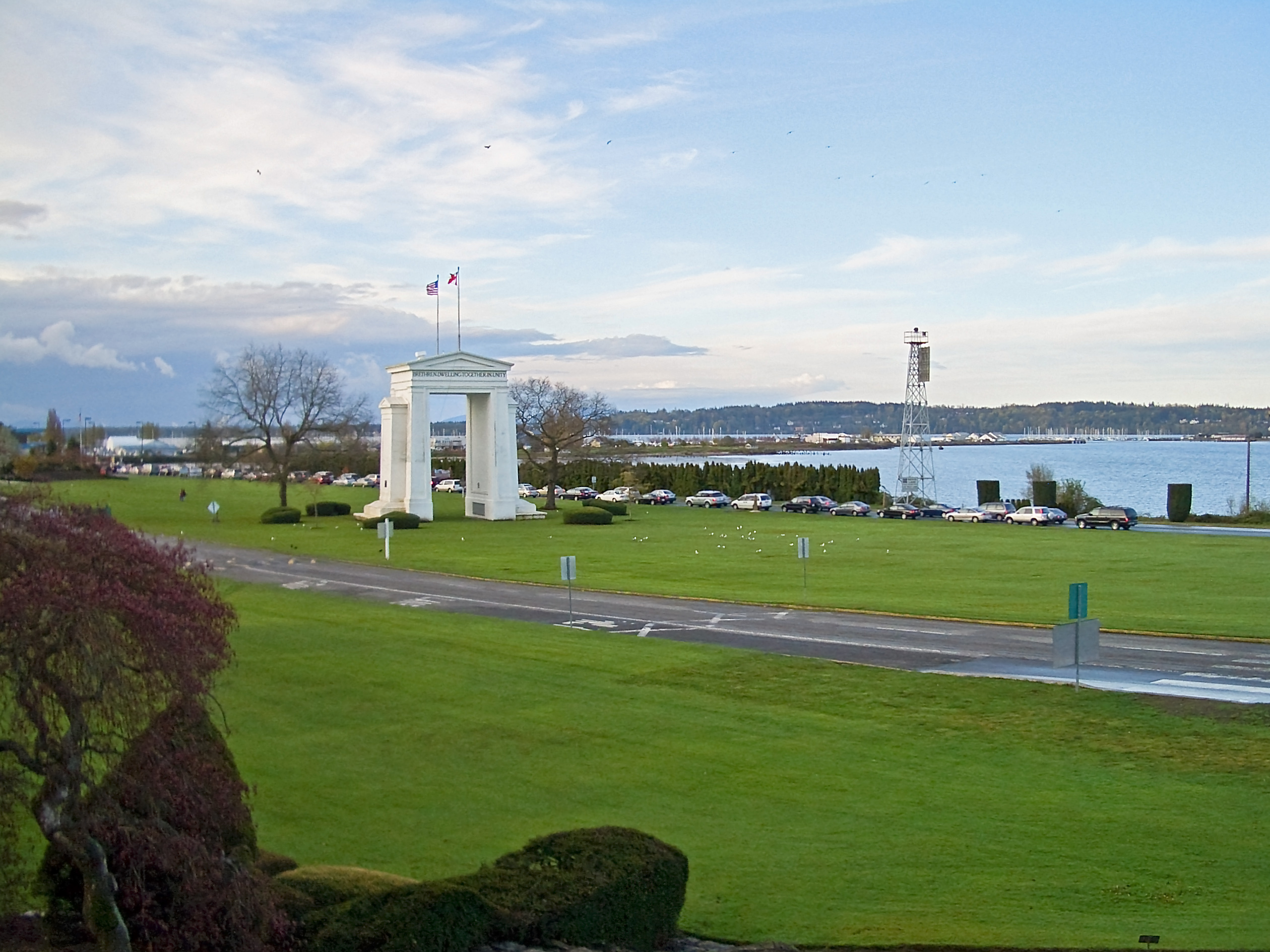
- Peace Arch Park, seen from the Canadian side
- Interactive map of Peace Arch Park
- Location: Canada and United States
- Nearest city: Blaine, Washington/Surrey, British Columbia
- Coordinates: 49°00′07.5″N 122°45′24″W
- Area: Canada: 22 acres (8.9 ha); U.S.: 20 acres (8.1 ha)
- Established: November 7, 1939
- Governing body: Canada: BC Parks; U.S.: Washington State Parks

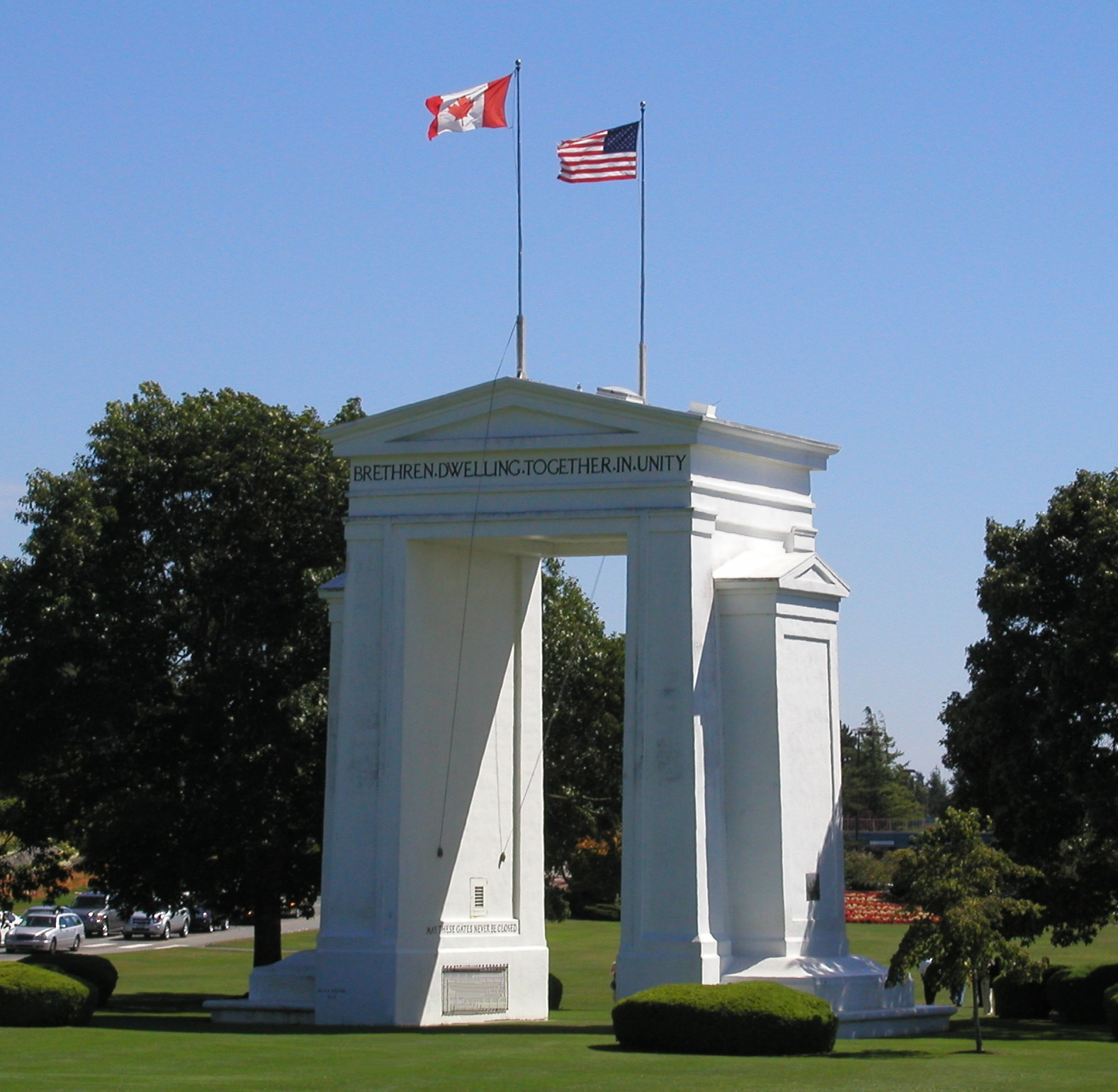
The Peace Arch monument

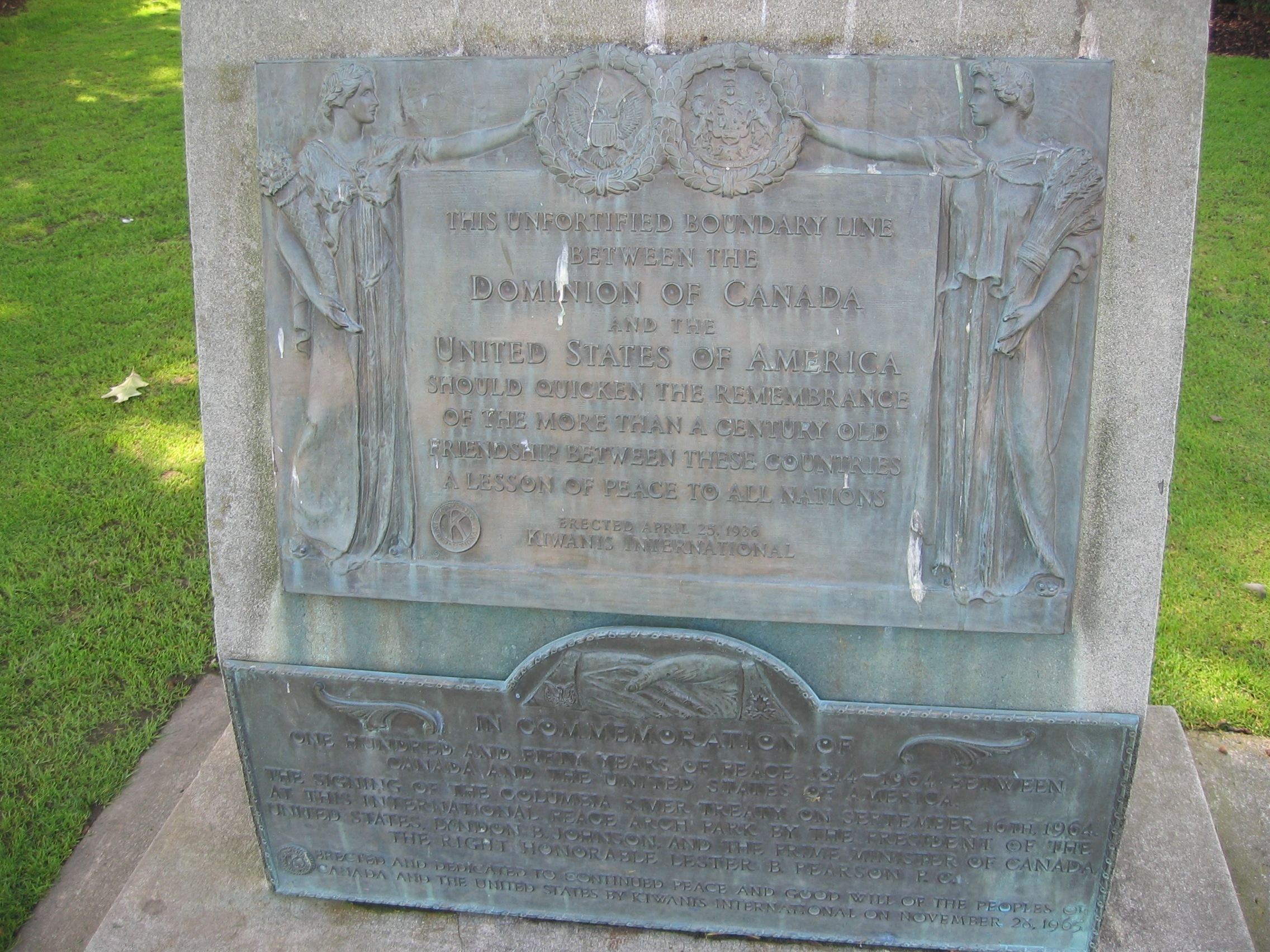
Plaque at the arch

Peace Arch Park is an international park consisting of Peace Arch Historical State Park in Washington, United States and Peace Arch Provincial Park in British Columbia, Canada. The park straddles the international boundary between the two countries at the extreme western end of the main contiguous section of the two countries' land border, between Blaine, Washington, United States, and Surrey, British Columbia, Canada, where it reaches Semiahmoo Bay of the Salish Sea on the continent's Pacific Coast.

The park's central feature is the Peace Arch (French: Arche de la Paix). Construction of the 20.5-meter-tall (67 ft) arch was headed by American lawyer Sam Hill and dedicated in September 1921. The Peace Arch commemorates the signing of the Treaty of Ghent in 1814 and symbolizes a long history of peace between the two nations. The monument is built on the exact U.S.–Canada boundary, where Interstate 5 on the U.S. side of the border becomes Highway 99 on the Canadian side, in the grass median between the northbound and southbound lanes.

The park is located at the Peace Arch Border Crossing (also known as the Blaine–Douglas Border Crossing), where Highway 99 in British Columbia and Interstate 5 in Washington State meet. It is one of the busiest border crossings between Canada and the United States, and the busiest such crossing west of Detroit. The park's northern portion is about 9 hectares (22 acres) and is managed by the British Columbia Ministry of Environment. The southern portion is about 20 acres (8.1 ha) and is managed by the Washington State Parks and Recreation Commission.

About 500,000 people visit the Peace Arch each year.

== History and description ==
Border inspection services at what is now known as the Peace Arch Border Crossing long predated the 1921 construction of the Peace Arch.

In 1914 Samuel Hill, lawyer for the Great Northern Railway, organized an international fundraising campaign to build the Peace Arch. American architect Harvey Wiley Corbett donated his talents to design the Arch. International volunteers began constructing in 1920. It was dedicated on September 6, 1921, and was considered one of the first earthquake-resistant structures built in North America.

It commemorates the Treaty of Ghent and the Rush-Bagot agreement ending the War of 1812, which "provided for peaceful resolution of U.S.—British disputes and an unguarded U.S./Canadian border." The United States side was established as a state park in 1931. The Canadian side was established as a provincial park on November 7, 1939.

The Peace Arch has the flags of United States and Canada mounted on the ridge of its roof, and inscriptions on each side of its frieze. The inscription on the U.S. side of the Peace Arch reads "Children of a common mother" (referring to the two nations' common origin from the British Empire), and the words on the Canadian side read "Brethren dwelling together in unity" (Psalm 133:1). Within the arch, each side has an iron gate mounted on either side of the border with an inscription above each gate: the one on the east side read "May these gates never be closed", while on the west side read "1814 Open One Hundred Years 1914".

The Peace Arch Park has been the site of various international events and protests. In 1952, African-American singer and activist Paul Robeson, banned from international travel during the Red Scares, performed several concerts at the site. He sang from a flatbed truck on the American side to an audience in Canada. The Peace Arch was vandalized with paint and other damage by Canadian protestors demonstrating against the Cambodian campaign during the Vietnam War on May 9, 1970.

The Arch was added to the Canadian Register of Historic Places in 1939, and to the U.S. National Register of Historic Places in 1996.

On February 9, 2010, the Vancouver 2010 Olympic Torch Relay visited the north side of the Peace Arch, while Premier Gordon Campbell and Governor Christine Gregoire addressed a crowd of several hundred people.

=== COVID-19 pandemic ===
In response to the COVID-19 pandemic, the Canada–United States border was shut down for non-essential travel on March 21, 2020. Initially, the parks on both sides of the border continued to open, allowing visitors from both sides of the border to gather at the park. However, as the number of park visitors continued to increase, the Canadian side of the park was ordered to close on June 18, 2020. On November 8, 2021, the border reopened to non-essential travel for Canadians who received a COVID-19 vaccine.

Despite the closure of the Canadian side of the park, and to get around mandatory Canadian public health and quarantine requirements, some visitors on the Canadian side continued to cross the border by directly accessing Peace Arch Historical State Park from 0 Avenue in Surrey. Although the U.S. Customs and Border Protection allowed Canadian visitors to enter the American side of the park and return to Canada, Canada Border Services Agency required anyone crossing the international border to report to CBSA to avoid potential penalties or charges. In an interview with CBC News, an immigration attorney from Washington state cited that the 1814 Treaty of Ghent prevents the erection of a barrier on the boundary, as it stipulates that such an action would cause the entire U.S.—Canada boundary governed by the treaty to revert to its pre-treaty status.

Peace Arch Park is one of the most common locations reported to have served for 2020–21 border weddings. Unlike other border crossings where weddings were held, Peace Arch allowed both sides to meet in the same location with no separation. Tents and other shelters were occasionally set up to allow for private gatherings, including between couples and partners; in 2020, the park had 140,000 visitors. During the 2021 Valentine's Day weekend, 78 tents were counted within the park.

== Recreation ==
Recreational activities include walking and picnicking as well as a playground for children. Visitors are allowed to explore both sides of the Canada–United States border inside the park, but are warned not to cross the boundary of the park to enter the adjacent country without being cleared to enter by the respective customs authority, as violators are subject to prosecution. Although no known cameras are in the park itself, United States Border Patrol agents in cars, on bikes, and on foot inside and steerable cameras on poles outside watch the park.

== Events ==
The International Peace Arch Association (IPAA) (formerly the United States Canada Peace Anniversary Association) is a nonprofit association dedicated to the heritage and preservation of the international monument. The association hosts park events and activities including the annual International Sculpture Exhibition, which highlights the work of American and Canadian artists.

== See also ==
- International Peace Garden
