= Peace Arch =

Monument on the Canada–United States border

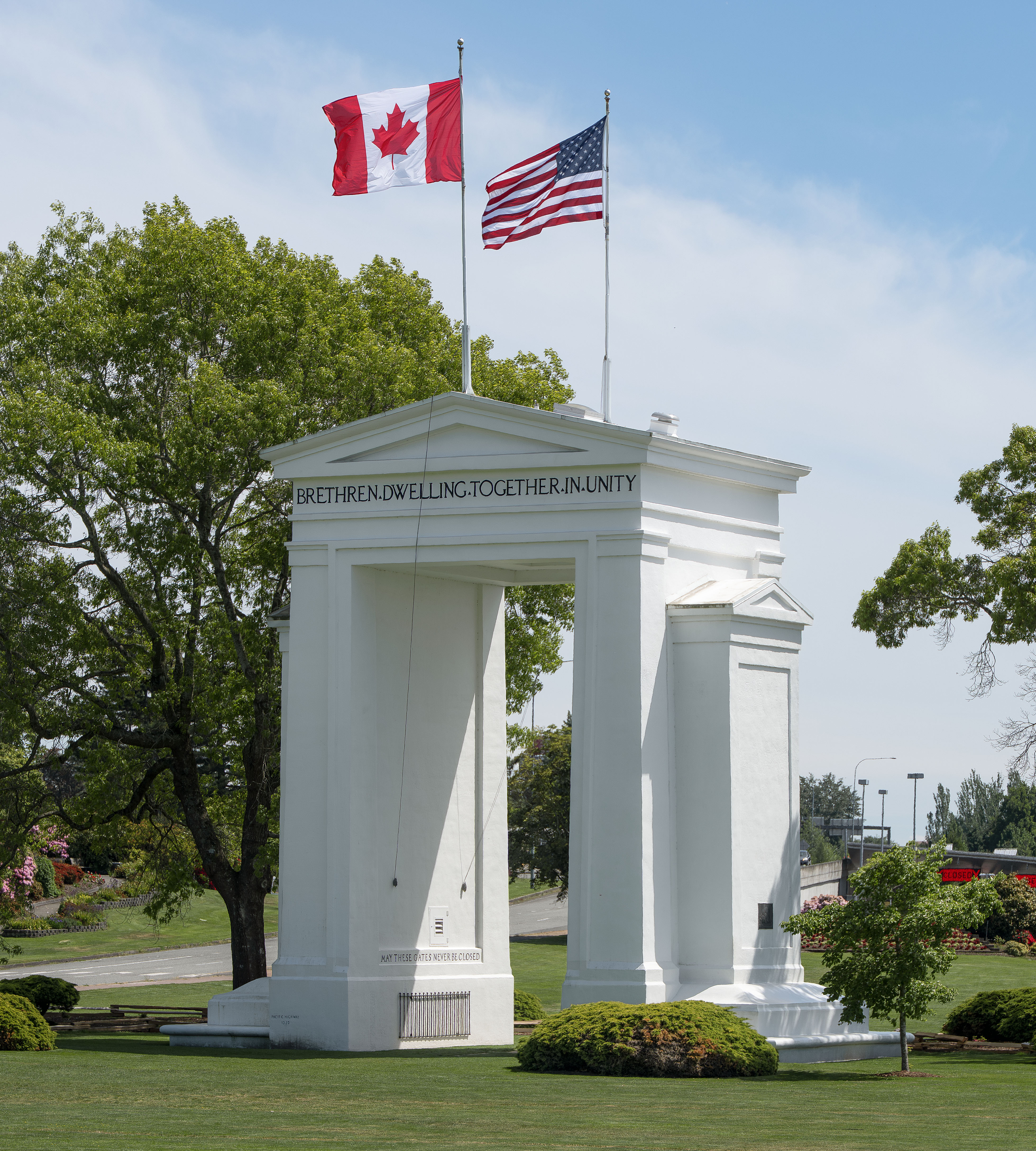
- The Peace Arch from the Canadian side.
- Interactive map of Peace Arch
- 49°00′07.7″N 122°45′23.5″W
- Location: Blaine, Washington, U.S. Surrey, British Columbia, Canada

History
- Built: 1921

Site notes
- Height: 67 feet (20 m)
- Architect: Harvey Wiley Corbett
- Architectural style: Classical Revival
- Governing body: Local

U.S. National Register of Historic Places
- Designated: December 13, 1996
- Reference no.: 96001493

The Peace Arch (French: Arche de la Paix) is a monument situated near the westernmost point of the Canada–United States border in the contiguous United States, between the communities of Blaine, Washington and Surrey, British Columbia. Construction of the 20.5-metre (67 ft) tall arch was headed by American lawyer Sam Hill and dedicated in September 1921. The Peace Arch commemorates the signing of the Treaty of Ghent in 1814, and symbolizes a long history of peace between the two nations. The monument is built on the exact U.S.–Canada boundary, where Interstate 5 on the U.S. side of the border becomes Highway 99 on the Canadian side, in the grass median between the northbound and southbound lanes.

The monument and the surrounding land is part of Peace Arch Park. Within the park is Peace Arch Border Crossing, a major border crossing between Interstate 5 and British Columbia Highway 99.

== Description ==
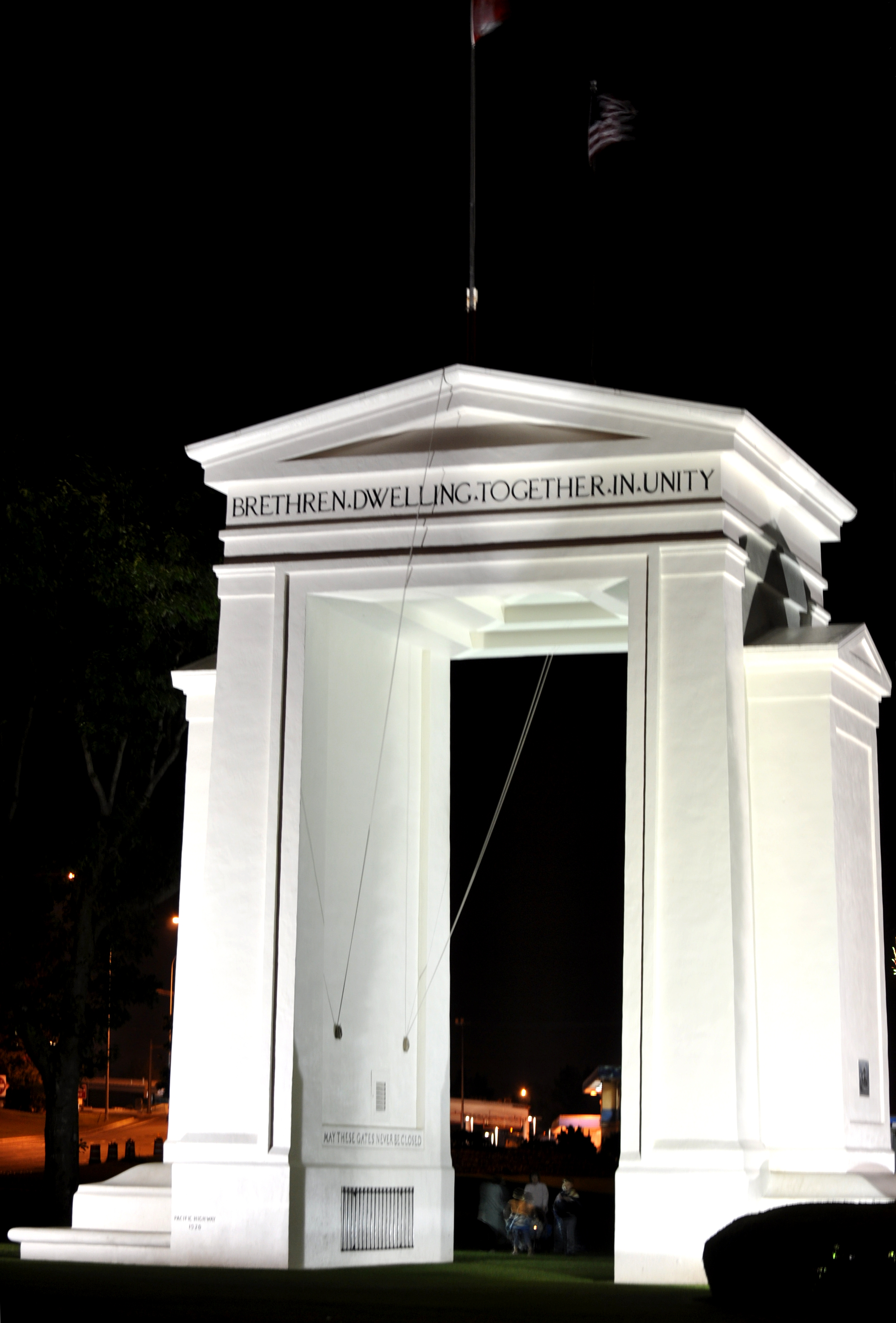
The arch at night

The Peace Arch has the flags of United States and Canada mounted on its crown, and two inscriptions on both sides of its frieze. The inscription on the U.S. side of the Peace Arch reads "Children of a common mother" (referring to the two nations' common origin from the British Empire), and the words on the Canadian side read "Brethren dwelling together in unity" (Psalm 133). Within the arch, each side has an iron gate mounted on either side of the border with an inscription above each gate: the one on the east side read "May these gates never be closed", while on the west side read "1814 Open One Hundred Years 1914".

The surrounding park, Peace Arch Park, consists of Peace Arch Provincial Park on the Canadian side and Peace Arch State Park on the American side of the border.

About 500,000 people visit the Peace Arch each year. The monument and surrounding park is considered an international park. As such, visitors do not require either a passport or visa to pass through their applicable border crossing so long as they stay within the boundaries of the park and leave the park into the country from which they entered.

Because of the Peace Arch monument, the border crossing between Surrey and Blaine is popularly known as the "Peace Arch Border Crossing". In Canada, the crossing is officially named Douglas after Sir James Douglas, the first governor of the Colony of British Columbia. It is one of the busiest border crossings between Canada and the United States, and the busiest such crossing west of Detroit.

== History ==
Border inspection services at what is now known as the Peace Arch Border Crossing long predated the 1921 construction of the Peace Arch.

In 1914 Samuel Hill, lawyer for the Great Northern Railway, organized an international fundraising campaign to build the Arch. American architect Harvey Wiley Corbett donated his talents to design the Arch. International volunteers began constructing in 1920. It was dedicated on September 6, 1921, and was considered one of the first earthquake-resistant structures built in North America.

The Peace Arch Park has been the site of various international events and protests. In 1952, African-American singer and activist Paul Robeson, banned from international travel during the Red Scares, performed several concerts at the site. He sang from a flatbed truck on the American side to an audience in Canada. The Peace Arch was vandalized with paint and other damage by Canadian protestors demonstrating against the Cambodian campaign during the Vietnam War on May 9, 1970. The protest continued into Blaine, where other buildings and structures were also damaged.

On February 9, 2010, the Vancouver 2010 Olympic Torch Relay visited the north side of the Peace Arch, while Premier Gordon Campbell and Governor Christine Gregoire addressed a crowd of several hundred people.

== Gallery ==
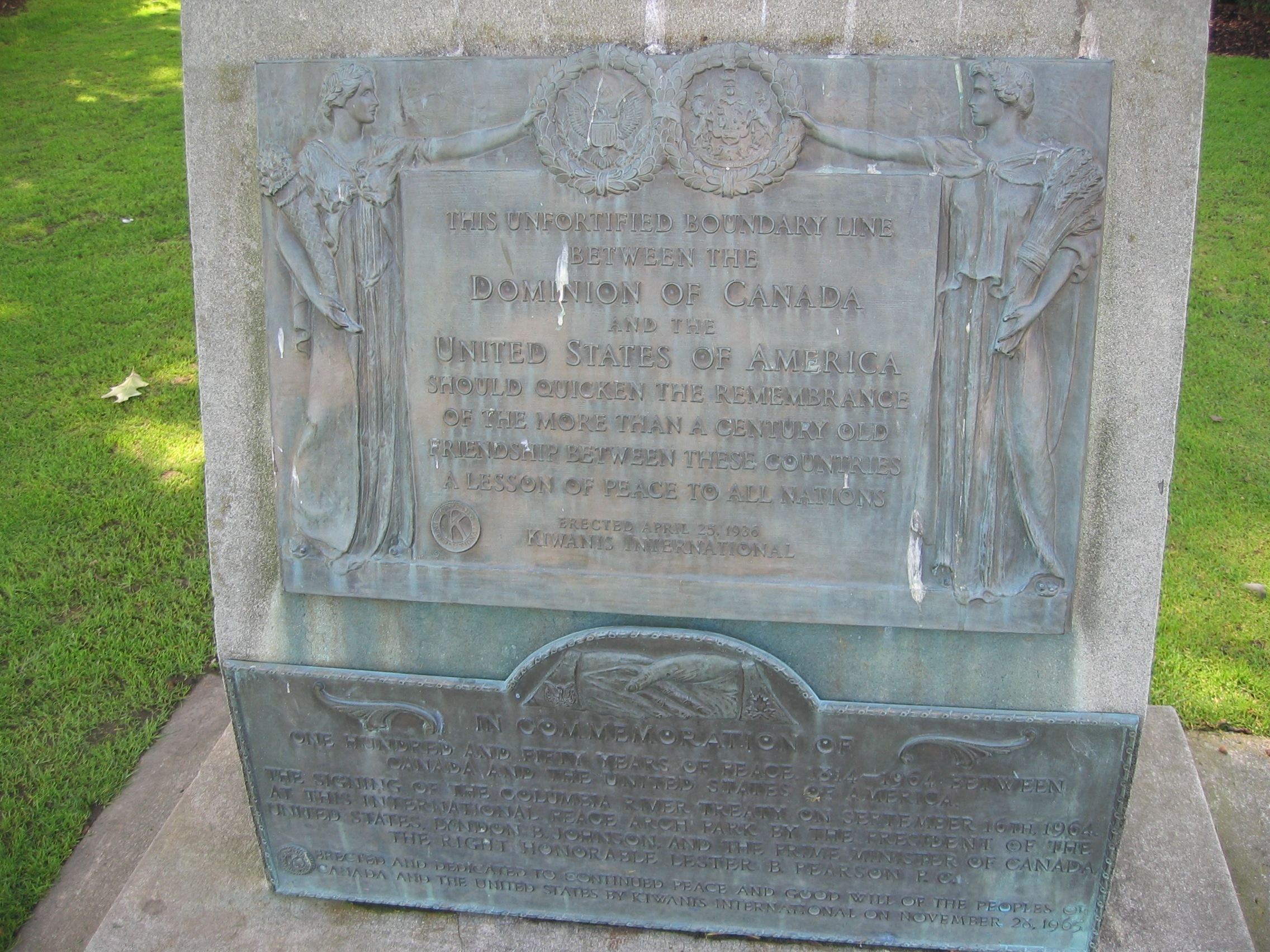
Plaque at the arch

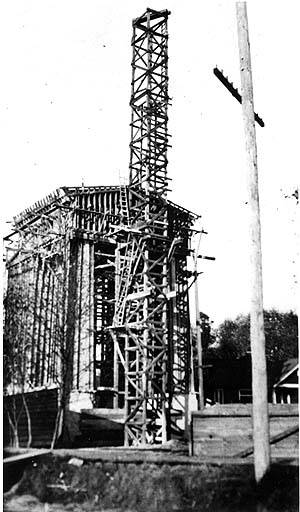
Construction of the arch, c. 1920

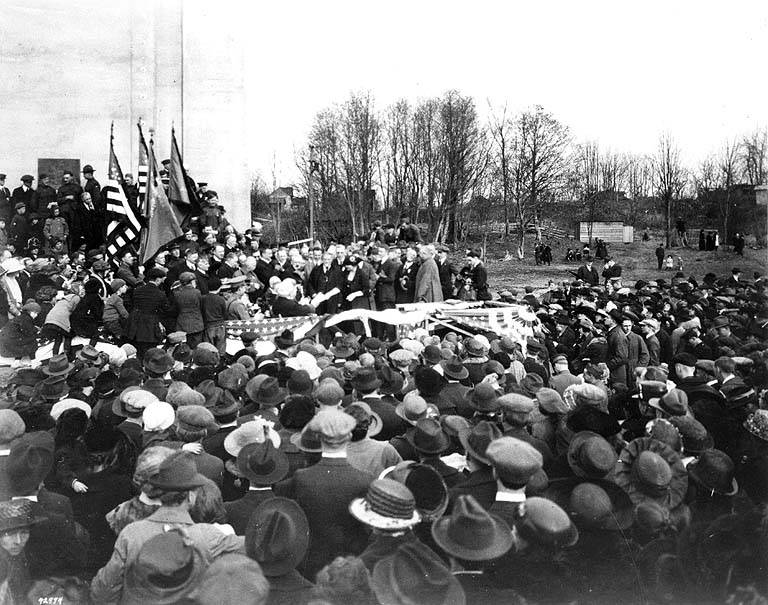
Dedication of the arch by Samuel Hill, September 6, 1921

== See also ==
- International Peace Garden
- Canada–United States relations
