= Washington State Route 548 =

State highway in Whatcom County, Washington, US

State Route 548
- A map of northwestern Whatcom County with SR 548 highlighted in red

Route information
- Auxiliary route of I-5
- Maintained by WSDOT
- Length: 13.85 mi (22.29 km)
- Existed: 1991–present

Major junctions
- South end: I-5 in Ferndale
- North end: I-5 in Blaine

Location
- Country: United States
- State: Washington
- Counties: Whatcom

Highway system
- State highways in Washington; Interstate; US; State; Scenic; Pre-1964; 1964 renumbering; Former
← SR 547	→ SR 599

State Route 548 (SR 548) is a state highway in Whatcom County, Washington, United States. It travels for 14 miles (23 km) between Ferndale and Blaine, terminating at interchanges with Interstate 5 (I-5) at both ends. SR 548 in Blaine, named Peace Portal Drive, follows the route of the Pacific Highway, later U.S. Route 99 (US 99) and Primary State Highway 1 (PSH 1). US 99 was decommissioned during the 1964 highway renumbering and the highway was maintained by Whatcom County until it was designated as SR 548 in 1991.

== Route description ==
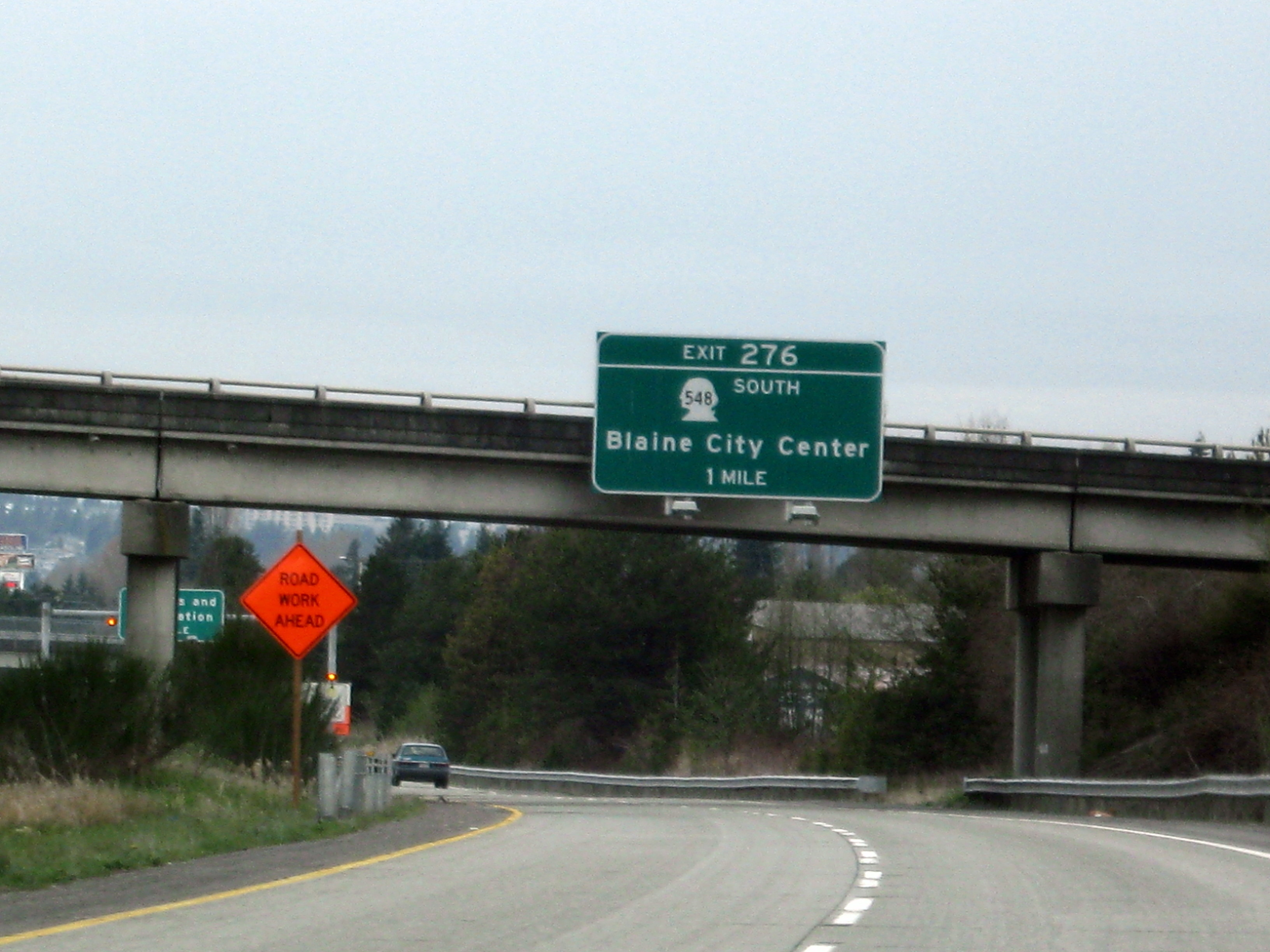
I-5 northbound approaching the northern terminus of SR 548 in Blaine.

SR 548 begins north of Ferndale at a diamond interchange with I-5, signed as exit 266. The highway travels west on Grandview Road, crossing over a railroad carrying the BNSF Railway's Bellingham Subdivision, and passes through a rural area while following Fingalson Creek. SR 548 passes north of Lake Terrell and part of the Whatcom Wildlife Area before crossing another set of railroad tracks and reaching the Cherry Point Refinery complex, the state's largest oil refinery. The highway turns north onto Blaine Road at a roundabout near the complex's main entrance, located east of Birch Bay State Park.

SR 548 continues north through the beach community of Birch Bay, overlooking a section of Boundary Bay. The highway then crosses over California Creek near the Loomis Trail Golf Club and Dakota Creek at the southern city limit of Blaine. The highway crosses over the BNSF Bellingham Subdivision and turns northwest onto Peace Portal Drive, traveling parallel to I-5 and the railroad through Blaine. The highway and the railroad move onto the shore of Drayton Harbor, part of Semiahmoo Bay, and travel north through downtown Blaine. SR 548 reaches its terminus at a dogbone interchange with I-5, signed as exit 276, near the city's marina, approximately 1/2 mile (0.8 km) from the Peace Arch crossing of the Canadian border. The interchange also includes ramps to D Street, which continues east to SR 543, and 2nd Street, which connects to a parking lot for Peace Arch State Park.

SR 548 is maintained by the Washington State Department of Transportation (WSDOT), which conducts an annual survey of average traffic volume on state highways that is measured in terms of annual average daily traffic. Traffic volumes on SR 548 range from a minimum of 2,100 vehicles near the Cherry Point Refinery to a maximum of 12,000 vehicles near its Ferndale terminus.

== History ==
SR 548 between Birch Bay and Blaine follows the route of a wagon road built in the 1900s parallel to a Great Northern rail line. The wagon road was codified in 1913 as the northernmost segment of the Pacific Highway, which later became State Road 1 during a 1923 restructuring of the highway system. The United States Numbered Highways were created in 1926 and US 99 was assigned to the Pacific Highway, becoming concurrent with the entire highway, which was replaced by PSH 1 in 1937. PSH 1 and US 99 were replaced during the 1964 highway renumbering by I-5 and Peace Portal Drive was removed from the highway system.

SR 548 was created in 1991 from the county- and city-maintained Peace Portal Drive, Blaine Road, and Grandview Road between Ferndale and Blaine. In 2010, WSDOT improved the I-5 interchange in Blaine at a cost of $13.2 million by converting it to a dogbone interchange using two new roundabouts. A roundabout was constructed at the Cherry Point Refinery in 2018.

== Major intersections ==
The entire highway is in Whatcom County.

Location	mi	km	Destinations	Notes
Ferndale	0.00	0.00	I-5 – Seattle, Vancouver B.C.	Southern terminus, interchange
Blaine	11.80	18.99	To I-5 south via Peace Portal Drive	
Blaine	13.85	22.29	I-5 – Seattle, Border Crossing	Northern terminus, interchange
1.000 mi = 1.609 km; 1.000 km = 0.621 mi
