= Semiahmoo =

Semiahmoo (/ˌsɛmiˈɑːmoʊ/ SEM-ee-AH-moh, /ˌsɛmiˈɑːmuː/ SEM-ee-AH-moo; North Straits Salish: SEMYOME or səmyámə) may refer to:

- Semiahmoo Bay, south-eastern section of Boundary Bay, bisected by the US-Canada border near White Rock, British Columbia

In Canada:

- Semiahmoo people, a Coast Salish people
- Semiahmoo First Nation, government of the Semiahmoo people
- Semiahmoo Indian Reserve, the Indian Reserve of the Semiahmoo people
- Semiahmoo Peninsula, bounded by the waters of Semiahmoo Bay and Boundary Bay
- Semiahmoo Secondary School, public high school in Surrey, British Columbia
- Semiahmoo Shopping Centre, shopping mall in Surrey, resting directly against the border with White Rock
- Semiahmoo Trail Elementary School, public elementary school in Surrey

In the United States:

- Semiahmoo Resort, a major golf resort and spa near Blaine, Washington
- Semiahmoo, Washington, an unincorporated community in Washington
- Semiahmoo Harbor Light, lighthouse near Blaine, Washington
