= Snokomish =

Coast Salish group

The Snokomish were a Halkomelem-speaking Coast Salish people whose territory was primarily located across the Boundary Bay area. The Snokomish were also known as the Derby people, as their territory included a portion of the Fraser River, near Derby, British Columbia.

== Territory ==
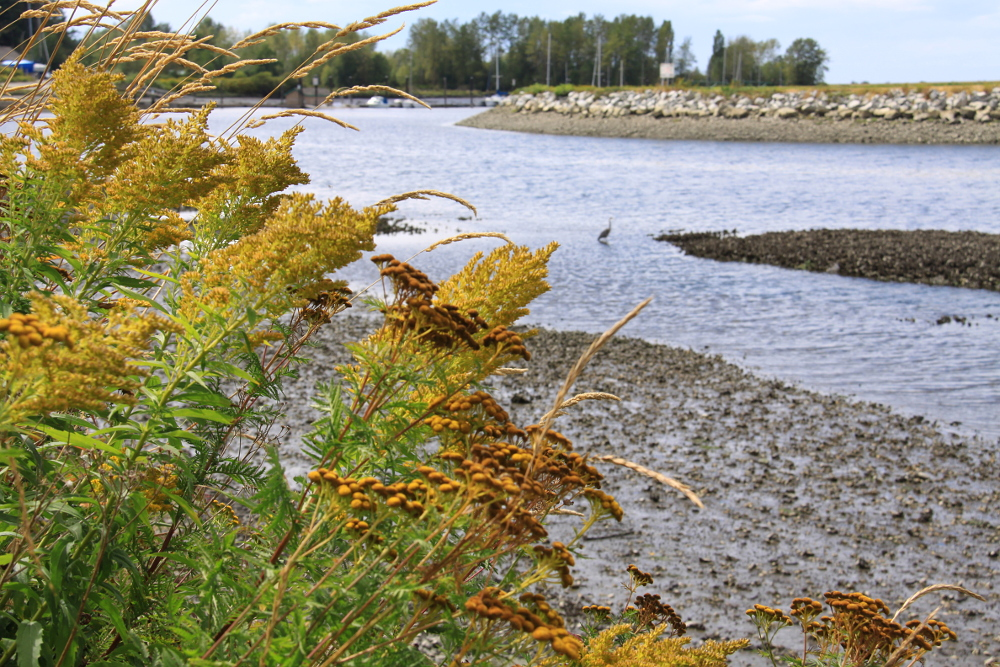
The banks of the Nicomekl River, Surrey, BC

Their territory surrounded the mouths of three rivers: the Nicomekl River, Serpentine River and Campbell River. Closest to modern day Point Roberts, Washington and Crescent Beach. The first two rivers empty into Mud Bay, the northeastern portion of Boundary Bay, north of today's Crescent Beach, whereas the mouth of the Campbell River empties into Semiahmoo Bay (the eastern portion of Boundary Bay).

The Campbell River lets out to the ocean at the Semiahmoo First Nation's reserve lands--very close to today's city of White Rock, British Columbia.

== Language ==
The Snokomish spoke Halkomelem. Their dialect was 'Downriver,' rather than 'Upriver,' or 'Island.' Their particular dialect was 'Nicomekl'.

== History ==
The population was decimated by a smallpox epidemic in 1850, and thereafter some individuals were absorbed into the neighbouring Semiahmoo, whose territory was immediately to the south, and who absorbed the water portion of Snokomish territory (the rest is now Kwantlen territory). Families with Snokomish heritage among the Semiahmoo retain hereditary rights to the mouths of the Nicomekl, Serpentine and Campbell Rivers. It is also thought that surviving individuals from the Snokomish First Nations were absorbed by other Halkomelem speaking neighbors such as the Tsawwassen First Nation, Katzie First Nation and Kwantlen First Nation.
