= Boundary Bay =

Bay on the Canada–United States border

- French: Baie Frontière
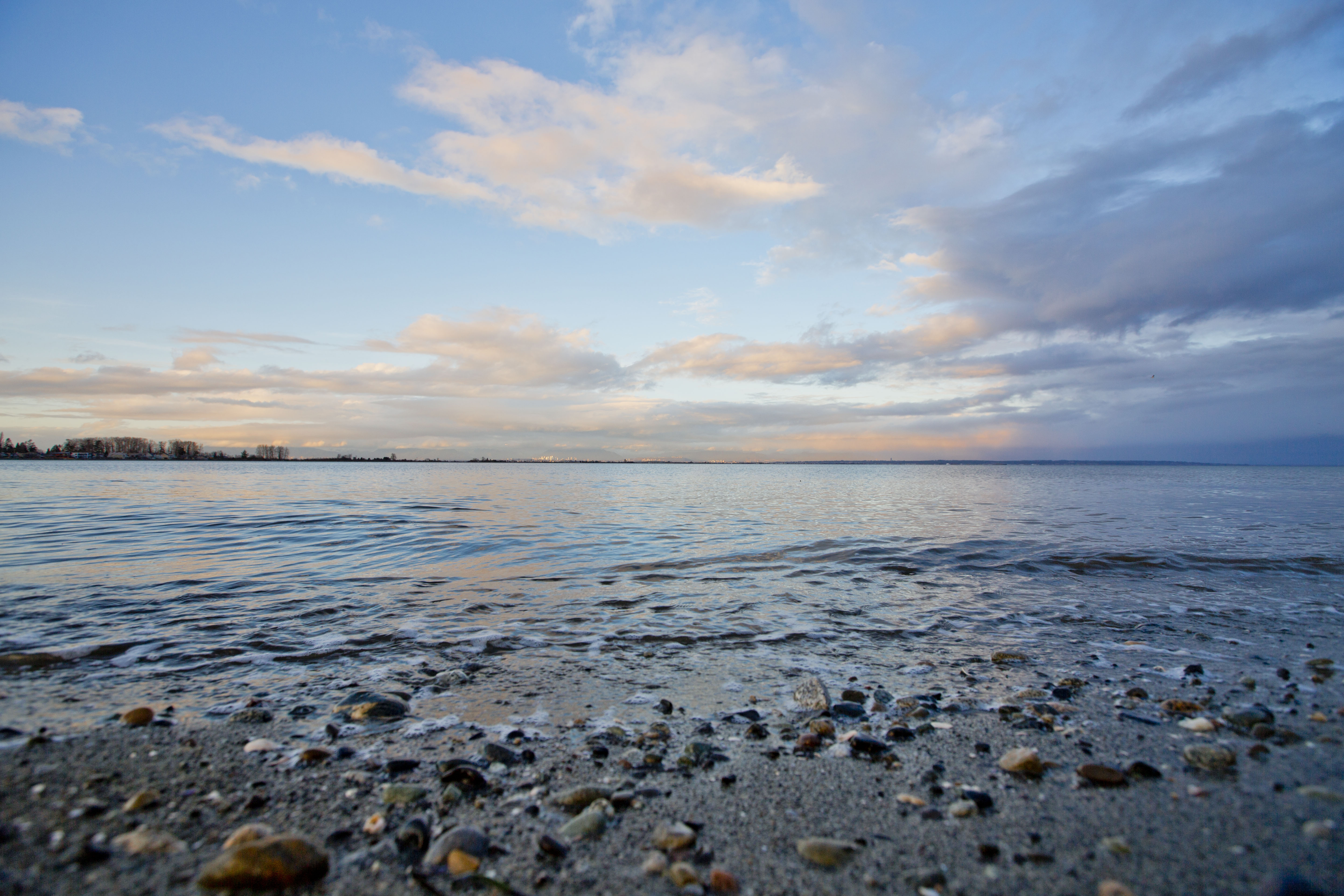
- Looking east across Boundary Bay from Tsawwassen

- Location within British Columbia
- Location: British Columbia and Washington
- Coordinates: 49°00′N 122°55′W
- Type: Bay
- Part of: Salish Sea
- Basin countries: Canada and United States
- Settlements: Blaine, Delta, Surrey, White Rock

Boundary Bay is a shallow bay situated on the Pacific coast of North America on the Canada–United States border between the Canadian province of British Columbia and the U.S. state of Washington.

== Geography ==
Boundary Bay is bounded to the east by the city of Blaine in Washington and the cities White Rock and Surrey in British Columbia. It is also bounded to the east by the reserves of the Semiahmoo First Nation in British Columbia. To the north, it is bounded by the City of Delta. To the west, it is bounded by the Tsawwassen Peninsula, which contains the communities of Tsawwassen (a suburb of Delta) and Point Roberts, Washington (a pene-exclave of the United States). To the south, it is bounded by the Strait of Georgia, the northern arm of the larger Salish Sea.

The eastern section of Boundary Bay straddling the US/Canada border and adjacent to the cities of White Rock and Blaine is known as Semiahmoo Bay; Blaine's Drayton Harbor opens into it. The northern tip of Boundary Bay is known as Mud Bay.

=== Inflows ===
The main rivers flowing into the bay are the Nicomekl and Serpentine Rivers falling into Mud Bay, the Campbell River falling into Semiahmoo Bay, and California Creek and Dakota Creek falling into Drayton Harbor.

== Ecology ==
It is an important stop for birds migrating along the Pacific Flyway, particularly for western sandpiper and dunlin, and has been designated a Hemisphere Reserve by the Western Hemisphere Shorebird Reserve Network and a Canadian Important Bird Area. The mudflats, extensive eel grass beds and salt marshes support a rich population of marine invertebrates which are an important source of energy for migrating shorebirds. During migration times the bird count in the bay may exceed 100,000. Pollution and industrial activity in the area pose potential threats to wildlife.

=== Conservation ===
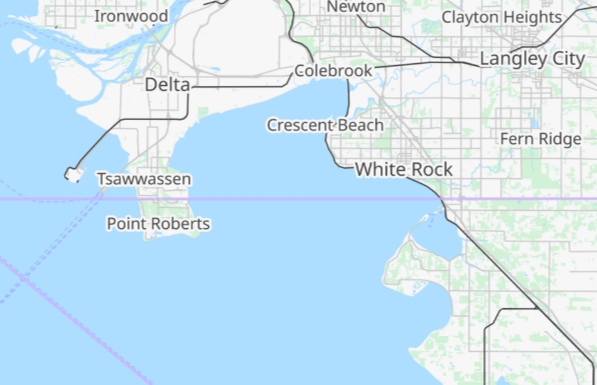
Map of Boundary Bay and surrounding area

On June 21, 1995, the entire Canadian portion of Boundary Bay was protected within the Boundary Bay Wildlife Management Area.

== Activities ==
The area is also used for recreational boating and includes park area and beaches. The Boundary Bay Airport, on its north flank, is used by small aircraft and has been the setting for various film shoots.

== See also ==
- Birch Bay
