= Birch Bay Waterslides =

Water park in Washington, United States

Coordinates: 48.9367°N 122.7475°W

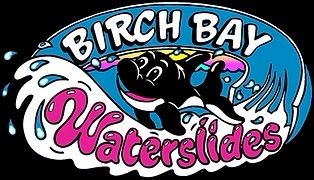
- Interactive map of Birch Bay Waterslides
- Location: Birch Bay, Washington, United States
- Owner: Jun Yu Development LLC
- Operated by: GMAP
- Opened: 1985; 41 years ago
- Previous names: Birch Bay Waterpark
- Operating season: June–September
- Status: Operating
- Area: 13.06 acres (5.29 hectares)
- Pools: 3 pools
- Water slides: 6 water slides
- Website: birchbaywaterslides.net
- Currently closed for the 2026 season.

The Birch Bay Waterslides is a water park in Birch Bay, Washington, operated by Global Management Amusement Professionals (GMAP) and owned by Jun Yu Development LLC.

The water park was built in 1985 amidst the wake of tourism from Canadians into Whatcom County, and is a big part of the community with many residents and tourists alike spend summer days there with their families.

Homestead Northwest (the owners of Homestead Farms in Lynden), purchased the park in 2005. Homestead Northwest would file for bankruptcy sometime in 2011, and the park would be acquired sometime in 2011 by a Richmond, British Columbia based company operating under the name Jun Yu Development LLC.

On August 25, 2023, an incident at the water park occurred. A man going down one of the slides known as “Hairpin”, when he ran into a broken splash guard panel and severely lacerated both of his legs. Eyewitnesses described the scene as “chaotic ” and “gruesome”. The park was sued, subsequently closed, stripped of its permits, and underwent renovations to address safety concerns. The park remained closed until June 2025 when it reopened after nearly two years and prepared to celebrate the 40th anniversary.

In January 2025, it was announced that California based GMAP (Global Management Amusement Professionals) was hired to operate the Birch Bay Waterslides. The park would undergo a $1 million renovation during this time.

In May 2026, the park announced it would be closed yet again for the 2026 season for unknown reasons. It was also announced that the park would be listed up for sale for $6 million.

== Attractions ==
The water park features 6 total waterslides:

- Twister - A winding slide branching from the main tower of slides.
- Corkscrew - the second of 3 slides that branch from the main tower.
- Snake - the third winding slide from the main tower.
- Hairpin - formerly a fourth slide from the main tower, but was removed due to the incident in 2023.
- River Ride - tubed ride that uses both single and double tubes feeding into a large pool.
- Blue Bearacota - separate tubed ride distant from other slides in the park.
- The Drop - near 90 degree free-fall slide with high velocity.

The water park also has 3 separate pools for swimming, including a kiddie pool, a normal beach-entry swimming pool, and a hot tub.

== Amenities ==
Birch Bay Waterslides has a gift shop, various seating areas, volleyball and basketball courts, and many concessions for food.
