= Semiahmoo Indian Reserve =

First Nations reserve in British Columbia, Canada

Coordinates: 49.013°N 122.765°W

The Semiahmoo Indian Reserve (/ˌsɛmiˈɑːmuː/ SEM-ee-AH-moo) is a 129.1-hectare (320 acre) Indian reserve in the Lower Mainland, British Columbia, located on Semiahmoo Bay between the City of White Rock and Peace Arch Park, which sits astride the international boundary with Washington state.

The reserve is under the administration of the Semiahmoo First Nation, which is the band government of the Semiahmoo people, a North Straits Salish-speaking subgroup of the Coast Salish. Currently the people of Semiahmoo's chief is Harley Chappell (since 2017).

The Semiahmoo Reserve was established by the Canadian government in 1887.

== See also ==
- Campbell River (Semiahmoo Bay)
- List of Indian Reserves in British Columbia
