= Semiahmoo people =

Straits Salish people

Semiahmoo
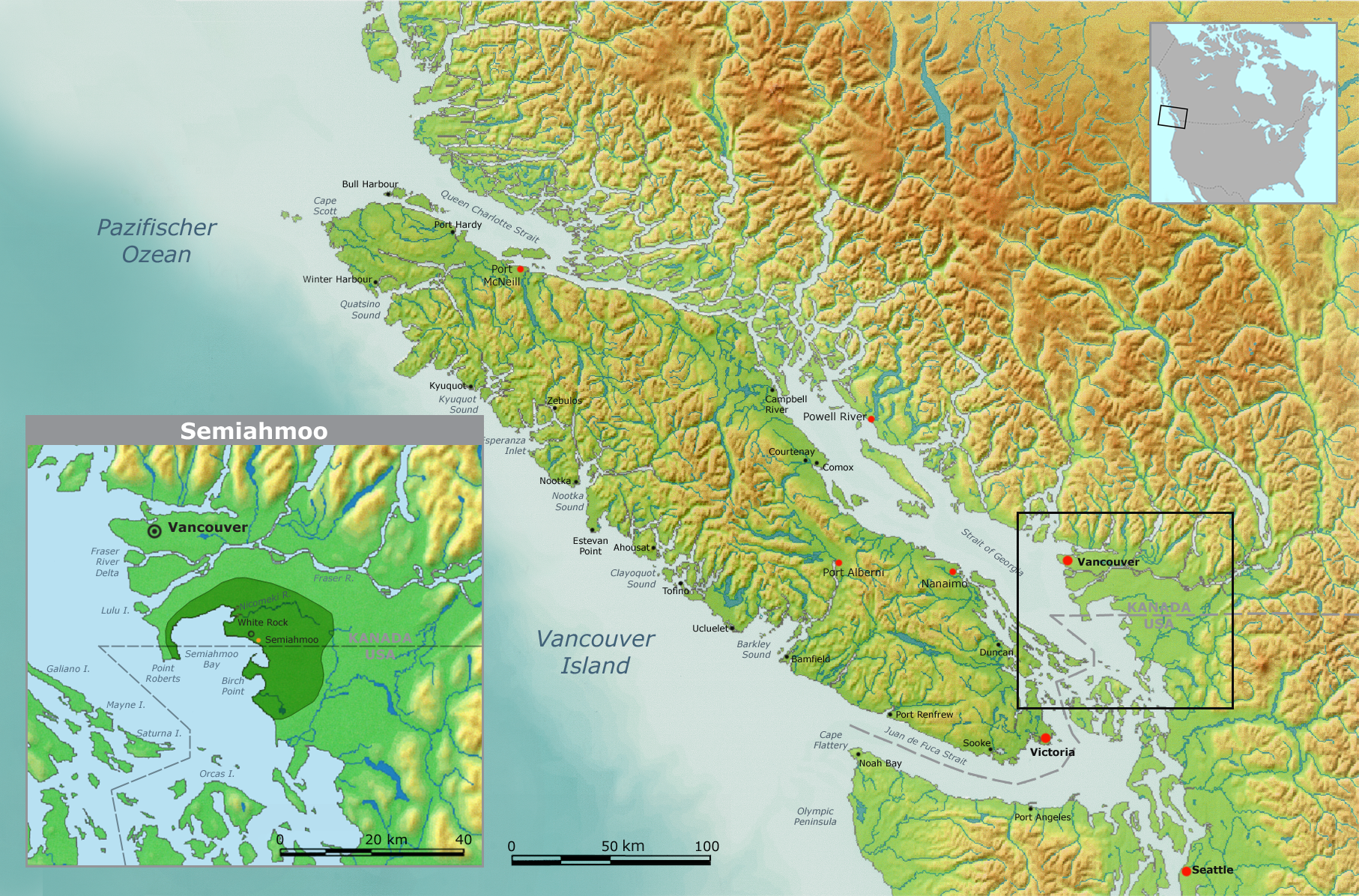

Regions with significant populations
- British Columbia, Canada; Washington, United States

Languages
- North Straits Salish, English

Religion
- Christianity; Traditional folk religion

Related ethnic groups
- Lummi, Saanich, Lekwungen, Samish, and T'Sou-ke peoples; other Coast Salish peoples

The Semiahmoo people (/ˌsɛmiˈɑːmuː/ SEM-ee-AH-moo; Straits Salish pronunciation: [səmyámə]) are a Coast Salish people who are Indigenous to southwestern British Columbia, Canada and northwestern Washington, United States.

Today, Semiahmoo people are enrolled in both the Semiahmoo First Nation in Canada and the Lummi Nation in the United States.

== Name ==
The name Semiahmoo is pronuounced [səmyámə] in their language, North Straits Salish. It is written as SEMYOME in the Saanich alphabet.

According to Chief James “Jimmy” Charles, chief of the Semiahmoo from 1909 to 1952, the name means “half-moon,” referring to the shape of Semiahmoo Bay. Alternatively, according to local White Rock historian Lorraine Ellenwood, the name could translate "in one sense" to 'water all around' or 'hole in the sky'.

The first occurrence of the word "Semiahmoo" in writing is in 1854, from United States Indian Agent E.C. Fitzhugh. Other used spellings up to the 20th century included Semmianma, Seiamannas, Shmimishmoo, and Semiamu.

== Classification ==
The Semiahmoo are in the Central Coast Salish cultural area, which also includes Squamish, Nooksack, Halkomelem-speaking groups, Klallam, and other North Straits Salish-speaking groups.

The Semiahmoo are closely related in culture and language to the other Straits Salish-speaking groups.

== Geography ==
In the mid-19th century, Semahmoo territory included the shoreline from Boundary Bay to Point Whitehorn, south of Birch Bay.

In the summer months, Semiahmoo people commonly utilized areas as far as Waldron Island, Lake Terrell, and Point Roberts.

=== Villages ===
The Semiahmoo originally had at least five villages, but by the mid-19th century, Semiahmoo villages were centered on Drayton Harbor and Birch Bay.

The main Semiahmoo settlement in the 18th century was at Semiahmoo Spit, between Semiahmoo Bay and Drayton Harbor. On the west side of the base of the spit, facing Semiahmoo Bay, were two rows of houses belonging to high-class people, while on the east side of the spit there was one row of houses belonging to low-class people. A few people lived on the end of the spit as well. Near where the spit narrowed, it was divided into a number of family-owned locations where duck nets were raised.

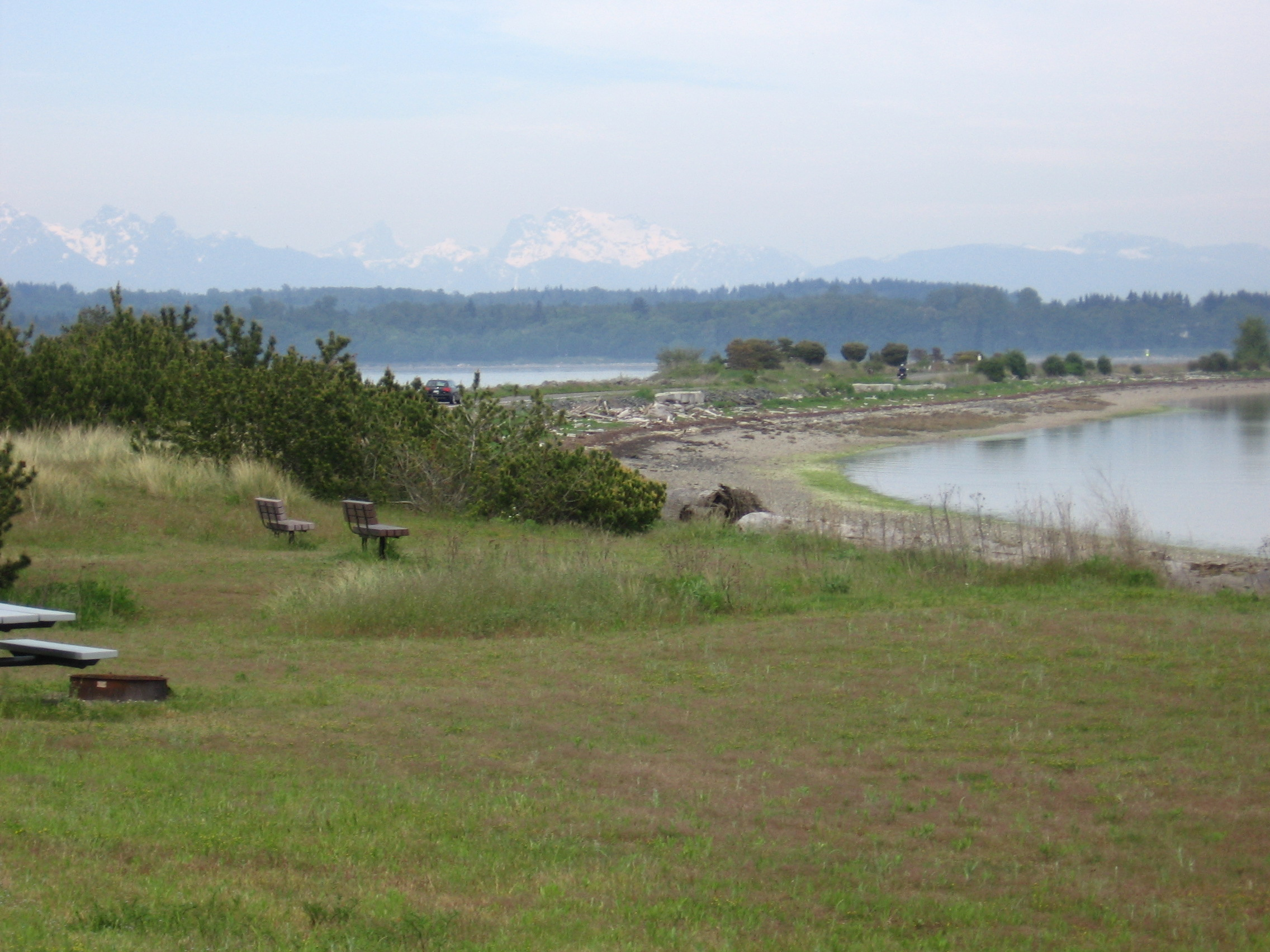
Semiahmoo Spit, 2008

Also on Drayton Harbor, between the mouths of Dakota and California creeks, was another village with large houses. By the 1790s, this had become the main Semimahmoo village. Duck nets were raised at the mouths of these creeks.

At Birch Bay was another village; this settlement was occupied by a group of people called the Hulwhaluq, though contemporary accounts surrounding this settlement were conflicting. They were possibly either an offshoot of Lekwungen people from Cadboro Bay with Semiahmoo living there as well, or they were an offshoot of the Semiahmoo. This village was a high-class village, but was eradicated by the mid-19th century either due to smallpox or a Klallam raid. Alternatively, a Lummi tradition recorded by Edward S. Curtis stated that they were eradicated by the Lummi people after they moved to the mainland from the San Juan Islands in the late 18th and early 19th century.

A large fort was located on the high ground at what is today Blaine. This fort was destroyed sometime between the 1820s and the 1850s. One account said that it was destroyed by northern raiders as early as the 1820s, while another account siad it was built around 1830 and destroyed during the Fraser Gold Rush. A map from Charles Wilkes's expedition showed that there was a settlement at the location in 1841.

Since around the late 1850s, the Semiahmoo settled at Campbell River, in former Snokomish territory north of the international boundary. Around the 1880s, this village stretched from today's White Rock to near the boundary. It included at least four longhouses and several other smaller buildings.

Additionally, the Semiahmoo maintained seasonal camping grounds around Boundary Bay at Point Roberts and Crescent Beach, near White Rock.

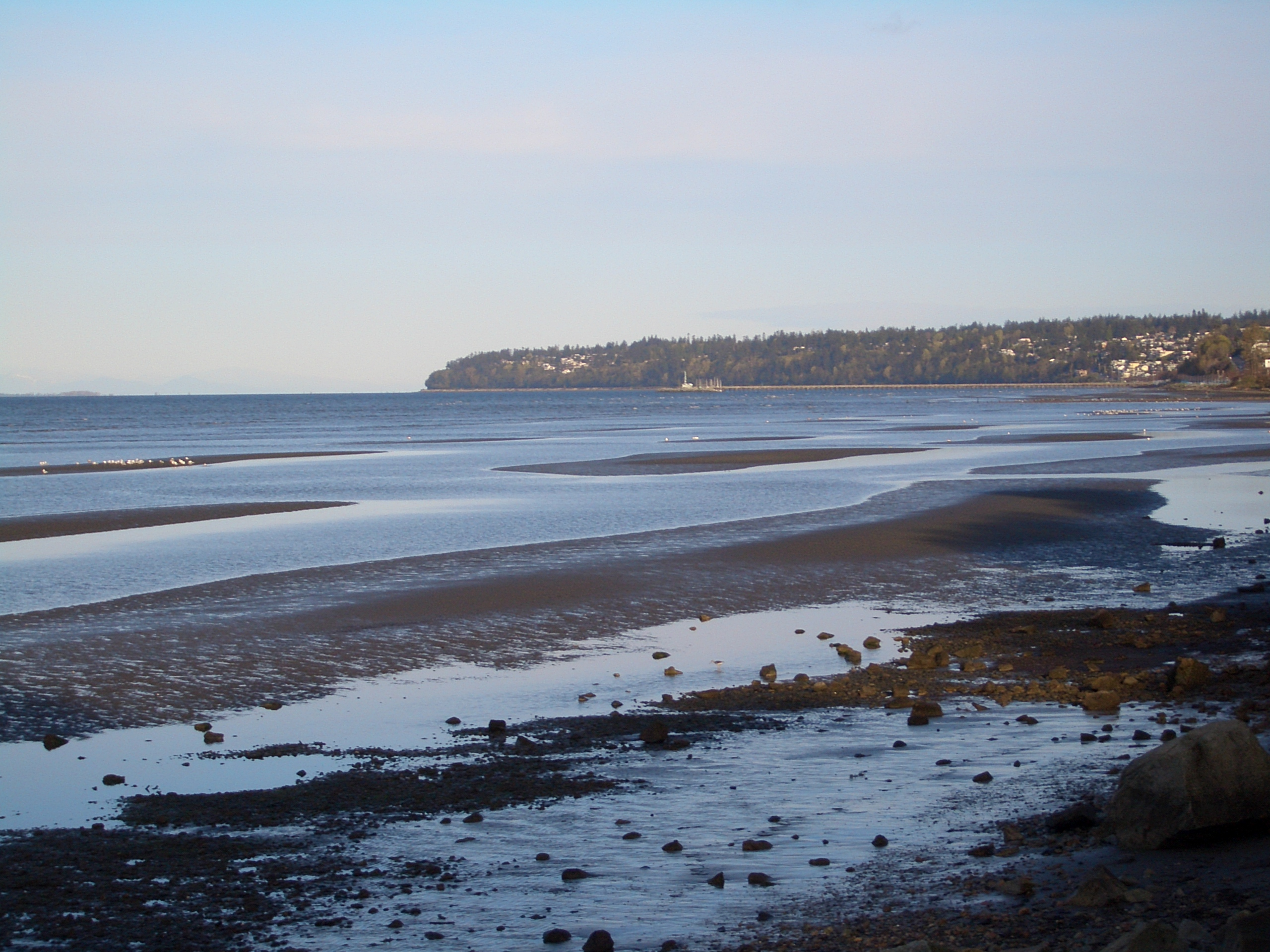
Semiahmoo Bay, 2007

=== Semiahmoo Indian Reserve ===
Semiahmoo First Nation administers the Semiahmoo Indian Reserve is located on Semiahmoo Bay in southwestern British Columbia. It was established in 1887 and originally contained 392 acres (1.59 km^{2}). It was reduced in size for right-of-way of the Great Northern Railway, Peace Arch Park, and for highways. It is currently 319 acres (1.29 km^{2}).

== History ==
In 1792, Captain George Vancouver explored Semiahmoo and Boundary Bays. He did not meet any Semiahmoo people, but did describe an unoccupied fishing camp on Point Roberts capable of containing at least 400 or 500 Inhabitants.

Around 1790, the Semiahmoo were estimated to have a population of about 300.

By 1800 the Semiahmoo population was declining, and this decline became more pronounced during the nineteenth century. By the early 1900s estimates placed the population at well under 100. This was due in part to smallpox and other epidemics that swept the area as a result of the increasing European presence.

Sometime before 1850, the Snokomish living on Boundary Bay were almost entirely wiped out by a smallpox epidemic. The last Snokomish people were absorbed into the Semiahmoo. Around the same time, the Semiahmoo living at Birch Bay were also almost eradicated, either by the same epidemic affecting the Snokomish, or from an enemy raid.

In the 1850s, Semiahmoo numbers continued to decline considerably due to raids from tribes to the north. George Gibbs estimated their population to be 250 in 1853.

Following the Treaty of Point Elliott, the Semiahmoo were expected by United States Indian Agents to remove to the newly-established Lummi Reservation to the south. A few did, but most of the remaining Semihamoo settled north of the U.S.-Canada border at the Campbell River, a former Snokomish village site.

In 1857, British Royal Engineers established Camp Semiahmoo, which was later used as a base to survey the international border. Soldiers described the Semiahmoo as "harmless and peaceable."

By the 1860s, Roman Catholic missionaries had a successful church among the Semiahmoo and a gold rush poured settlers and miners into the area. A new trail was built to link Semiahmoo Bay with Fort Langley. The 1862 Pacific Northwest smallpox epidemic and another epidemic in 1888 resulted in heavy loss of life among the Semiahmoo. Many Semiahmoo worked as loggers or charged tolls for transportation of logs across their land. Reef-netting also became commercialized until a continuous line of traps by Alaska Packers ended their industry in 1892.

== Culture ==
Dialects of the North Straits Salish language

=== Language ===
The traditional language of the Semiahmoo is called North Straits Salish, and is also the language of the Saanich, Lekwungen, Samish, Lummi, and Sooke peoples. In the 19th century, it was spoken on Vancouver Island from Saanich Inlet to Sheringham Point, in the San Juan and southern Gulf islands, and on the mainland roughly from Point Roberts to Deception Pass.

Within the language, there are distinct varieties spoken by each of the tribes that speak it; the Semiahmoo have their own variety.

=== Society ===
Semiahmoo society did not have a formal political structure. The First Nation was divided into politically and economically independent households. Each plank house held several families united by bonds of kinship. There were also two classes—an upper and lower—of free men and a class of slaves. The upper-class free men had inherited privileges. Slaves were primarily war captives or the descendants of war captives.

=== Foodways ===
Salmon was the traditional staple food of the Semiahmoo, with sturgeon also playing an important role. Additionally berries, roots, bulbs, and fruit, as well as waterfowl, supplemented the diet.

The distinguishing feature of Semiahmoo culture and other tribes of the Straits is reefnetting. In the summer, Semiahmoo people went to the grounds at Point Roberts where they shared extensive reefnetting grounds with the Saanich and Lummi, among others. Most of the food supply was caught at Point Roberts.

The Semiahmoo at the Semiahmoo Spit village had clam beds at the end of the spit. Clams were also harvested at the Crescent Beach area.

The Semiahmoo also hunted game, including deer and elk in the summer at Lake Terrell and what is today Custer. In the winter, beaver and bear were hunted at the heads of the Serpentine and Nicomekl rivers; beaver was also hunted at Lake Terrell during that time.

The most important plant was camas, which grows on prairies throughout the region. Behind each village, the Semiahmoo maintained camas prairies, as well as travelling to the islands in the strait to gather on the prairies and cliffsides there. Camas is harvestable for a short time in May, during which women would use digging sticks to harvest the bulbs. After harvesting, the dirt in the beds was loosened so that the camas could regrow.

Wild berries were harvested on floodplains. Crescent Beach was in particular known for its plentiful cranberries.

== Society ==
=== External relations ===
Prior to the mid-19th century, the Semiahmoo were bordered to the north by the Snokomish, who spoke Halkomelem, another Salishan language. The Semiahmoo and Snokomish were closely intermarried and shared resources, including a weir on the Campbell River and hunting territory. This close friendship was possibly furthered by increased post-contact trade in the Fort Langley area. Following the near-eradicaton of the Snokomish to Smallpox, the remainder joined the Semiahmoo. The Semiahmoo maintained Snokomish territorial claims, with a number of them ultimately relocating to a former Snokomish site north of the international boundary.

=== Economy ===
Reefnetting remained the primary occupation of Semiahmoo people until the 1890s, when white settlement drove away Semiahmoo people from their usual and accustomed fishing areas. Some Semiahmoo during that time also worked as loggers.
