= Campbell Valley Regional Park =

Regional park in Langley, British Columbia, Canada

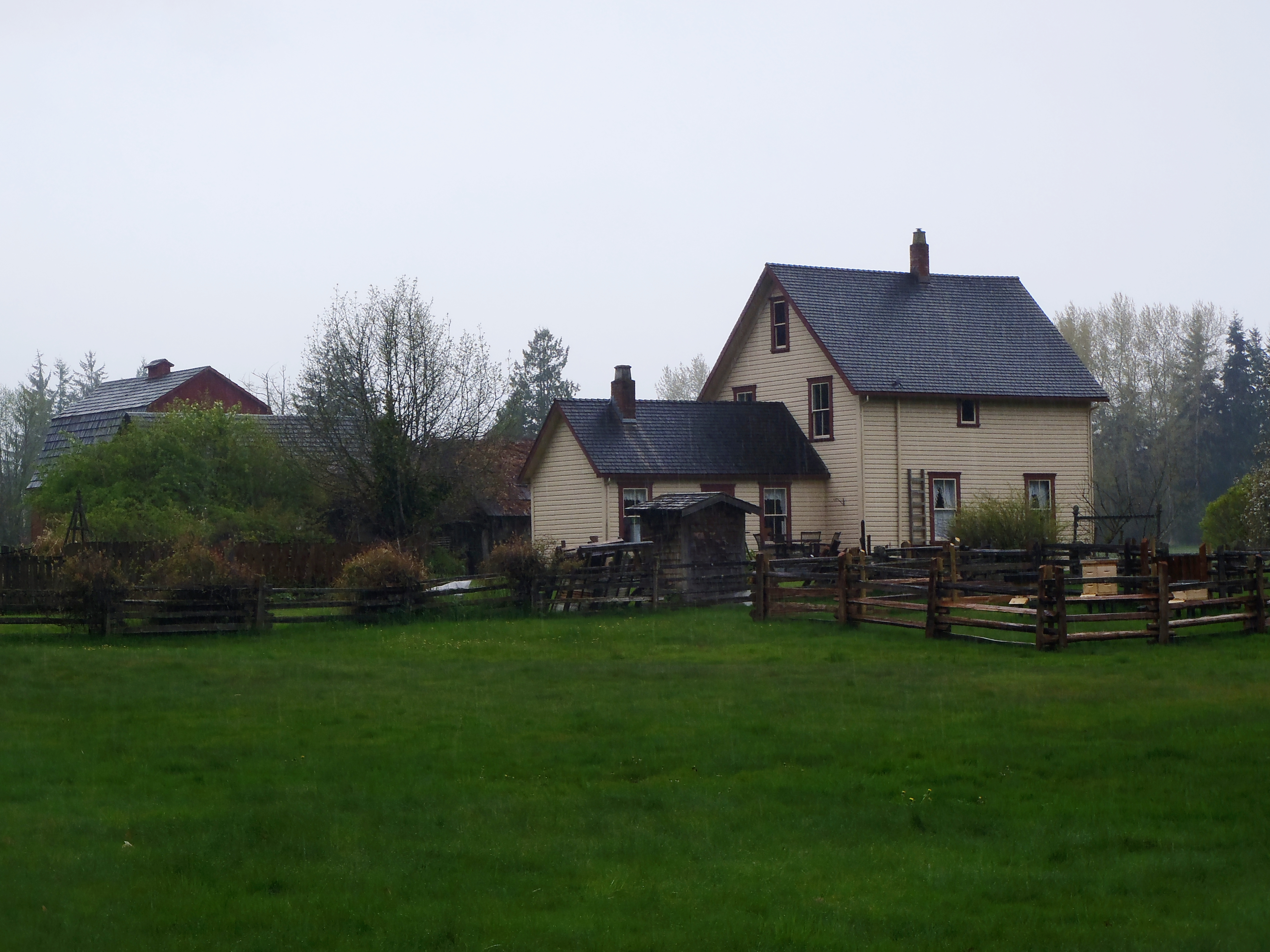
- The Annand/Rowlatt Farmstead Site near the South Valley Entrance.

- Location within Greater Vancouver Regional District
- Interactive map of Campbell Valley Regional Park
- Type: Municipal
- Location: Langley, British Columbia, Fernridge, British Columbia
- Coordinates: 49°01′14″N 122°39′13″W
- Operator: Metro Vancouver Regional District
- Status: Open all year Facilities/Trails Seasonal
- Parking: One lot
- Website: metrovancouver.org/services/regional-parks/park/campbell-valley-regional-park

Campbell Valley Regional Park is a regional park in the Township of Langley, maintained by the Metro Vancouver Regional Parks board. The park is formed from 6 historical farm plots, with portions set aside for the Langley Tree Farm and scout Camp McLean. It contains a vast number of hiking, walking and equestrian trails as well as function facilities such as picnic shelters. The park is also the location of the Metro Vancouver Regional Parks East Area offices, located at the northwest corner of the park. The Campbell River crosses through the park.

As of 2019 the park comprised a total area of 1,352 acres.

== Trails ==
Within the park there are 29 kilometres of trails, all unpaved, 14 km of which are designated for equestrian use and 1 km of which is set aside solely for pedestrian and bicycle use. More bicycle trails have become available since the 2009 construction of the perimeter trail.

== Facilities ==
There are two main entrances to the park and one main equestrian entrance. The two main entrances are the North Valley Entrance along 16th Avenue and the South Valley Entrance on 8th Avenue. The equestrian centre and parking lot are located on 208th Street, south of 16th Avenue. Other entrances include the entrance to Camp Coyote, a Metro Vancouver group camping site.

Drinking water is available at both the North and South Valley Entrances. Shelter is available at the South Valley Entrance.

Also at the South Valley Entrance is the Nature House, a visitor centre which provides occasional insight into the ecology of the park. It is located near a small pond and a gazebo.

== History ==
=== Annand/Rowlatt Farmstead and Lochiel Schoolhouse ===
The Southern end of the park is home to both the Rowlatt Farmstead and the historical Lochiel Schoolhouse. Both landmarks predate 1924. The Rowlatt Farmstead is occupied by a family and, although the fields and grounds are public, the fenced lawn around the house is private. Lochiel schoolhouse is occasionally opened upon reservation.

Lochiel Schoolhouse is the namesake for École Élémentaire Lochiel, an all-French immersion elementary school which was closed by the school district in 2001.

=== Logging ===
In the late 19th century and the early 20th century, many logging companies took advantage of the temperate rainforest in the area and clearcut the entire park. During this time, logging railways wound throughout the park. The route of one such rail line is clearly visible today along the Ravine Trail at the South end of the park. The routes of the railways are marked on park maps.

Throughout the second-generation rainforest, which has successfully recovered, many stumps of the fallen trees are left, some in excess of two metres across. These stumps bare the scars from springboards, the name for platforms that loggers would cut into the large trees to reach a narrower section of the trunk.

=== Langley Speedway ===
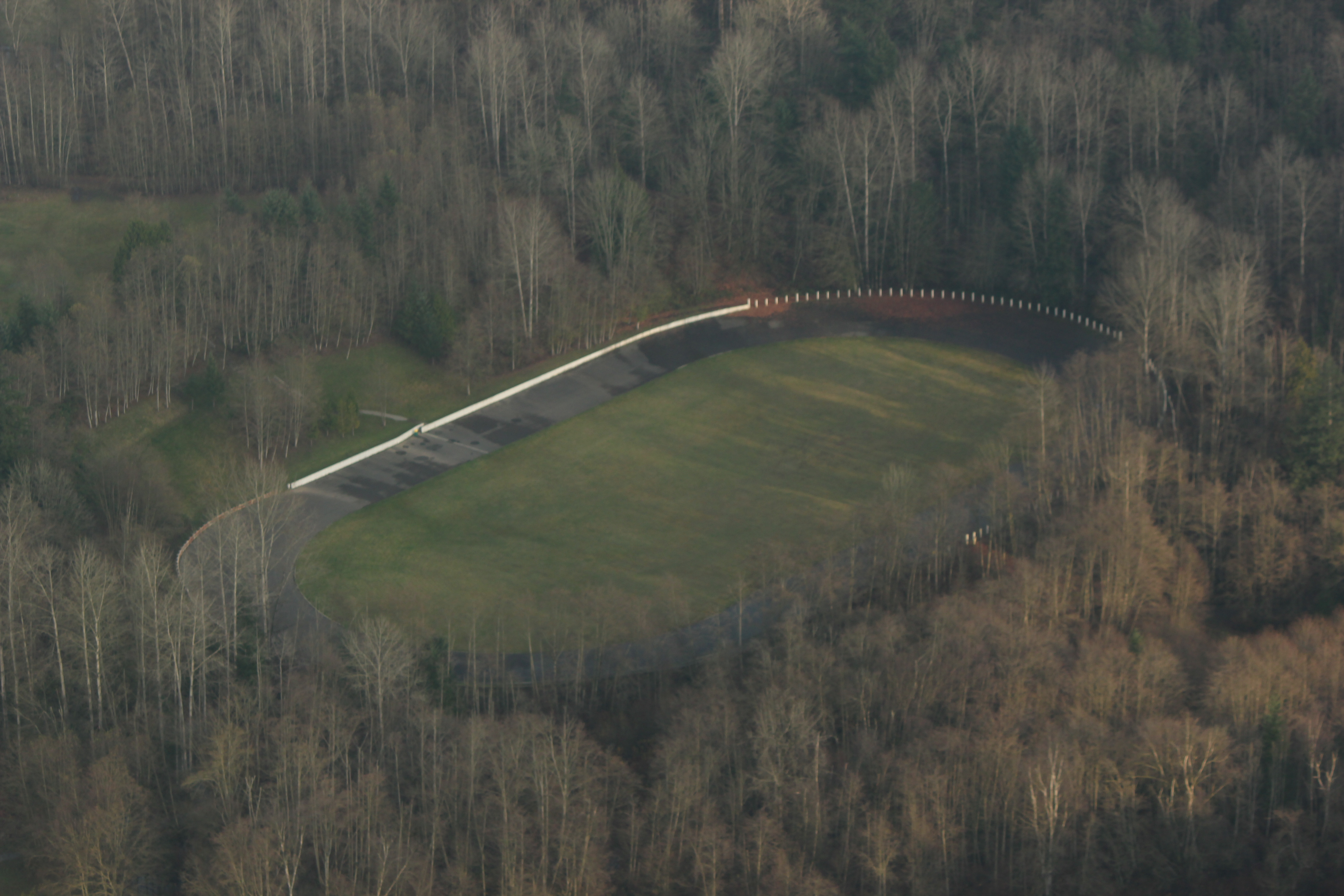
Langley Speedway as seen from the air.

An old paved racing oval is located in the eastern section of the park and is maintained by the Langley Speedway Historical Society. In the past, it was host to local and NASCAR racing events.

== Celebration of Nature ==
On the third weekend of September, an annual two-day commerce fair is held at the Rowlatt Farm, which is a showcase of the local lifestyle and economy. Many artisans, confectioners and musicians showcase their skills at this event.
