= Fern Ridge, Langley =

Neighborhood of Langley, British Columbia

Coordinates: 49°03′00″N 122°39′00″W

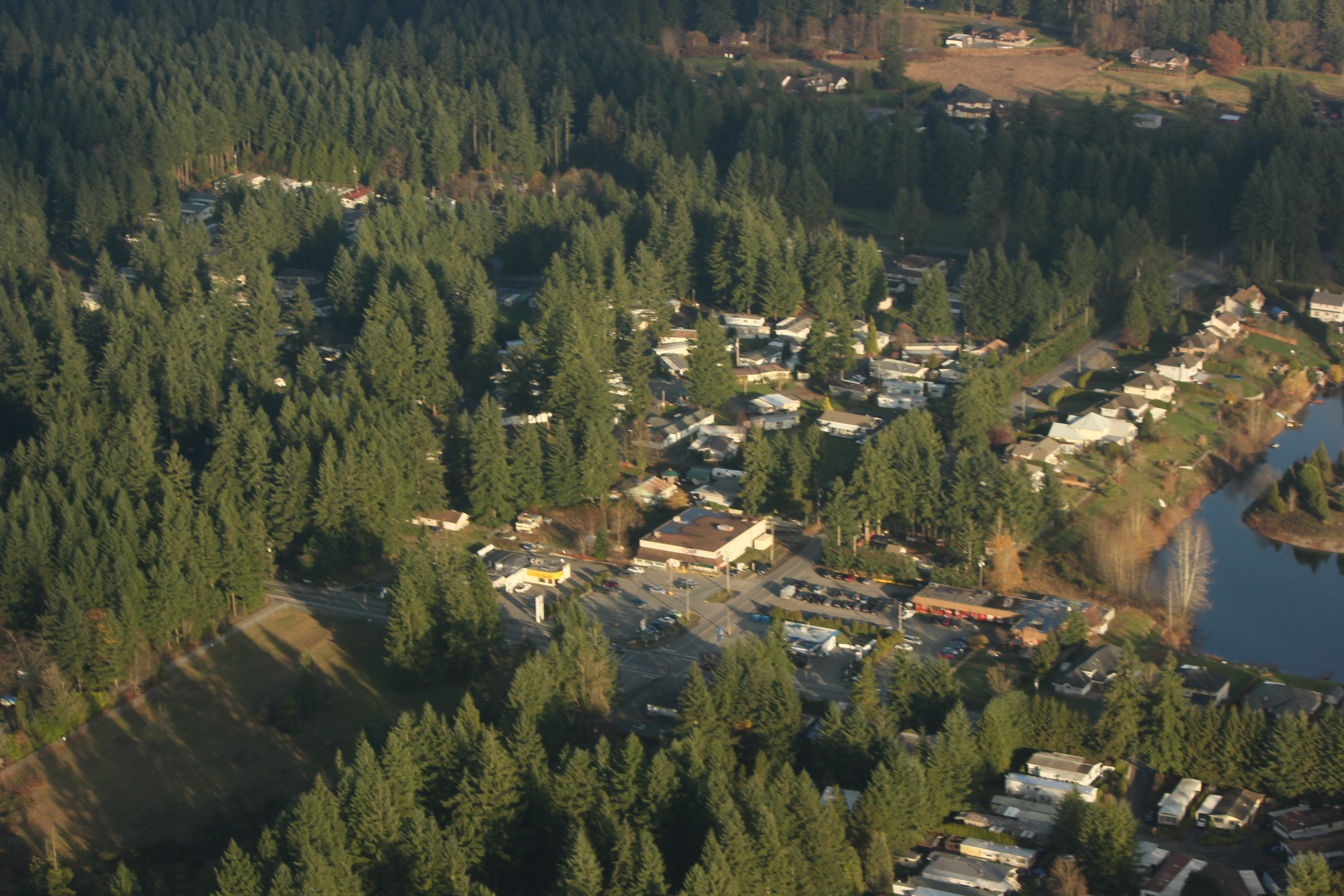
Fernridge as seen from the air.

Fern Ridge is a neighbourhood of Langley, British Columbia. It is located in the southwestern area of Langley Township, near Campbell Valley Regional Park. 200th Street, or Carvolth Road, runs south through Fern Ridge, and TransLink provides hourly bus service during daylight hours to Langley City. There is one church in the community, a Mennonite church.

== Education ==
There is one elementary School, Glenwood Elementary School, in Fern Ridge. The former South Carvolth Environmental Elementary School was closed by the school district in 2006.

== Commerce ==
Fern Ridge is home to two gas stations, a Super Save and a Race Trac Gas, which were formerly a Shell and a Mohawk. There is an IGA, and a pub and liquor store combined. The pub is called the Artful Dodger. Fern Ridge Hall provides a venue for small events, such as weddings, for locals.
