= California Creek (Washington) =

Location
- Country: United States
- State: Washington
- County: Whatcom

Physical characteristics
- Mouth: Drayton Harbor
  - location: Blaine, Washington
  - coordinates: 48°57′45″N 122°44′6″W
- Length: 7.25 mi (11.7 km)
- Basin size: 22.9 sq mi (59 km^{2})

California Creek is a stream in Whatcom County, Washington, in the northwestern United States. It emerges from springs and surface runoff north of the city of Ferndale, flowing 7.25 miles (11.7 km) to the northwest while taking in various small, unnamed tributaries and agricultural drainage ditches. It drains into the Salish Sea at Drayton Harbor in a residential area within the city of Blaine. Coho salmon and cutthroat trout spawn in the creek. Named for a group of Californians who settled in the area during the 1850s, much of the California Creek watershed consists of dairy farms and other agricultural operations. The large number of ditches allow for significant agricultural runoff, resulting in elevated levels of fecal coliform bacteria. Culverts which blocked salmon passage were renovated in 2020, while the Whatcom Land Trust has purchased property around the creek's estuary for environmental restoration.

== Course ==
California Creek originates from springs and surface runoff at Holman Hill north of the city of Ferndale, Washington. It flows generally northwest through rural agricultural land, receiving water from various small, unnamed tributaries and agricultural drainage ditches. It is winding and similar to a slough for much of its course. The largest tributary is an unnamed 3.6 mi (5.8 km) left-bank tributary that runs parallel to the stream for part of its middle course. About 7.25 miles (11.7 km) from its source, California Creek enters a residential area in the city of Blaine, Washington, and drains into the Salish Sea at Drayton Harbor.

== Hydrology ==
The California Creek watershed measures 22.9 square miles (59 km^{2}) in area. The upper portions of the watershed are dominated by dairy farms and other agriculture, while the lower watershed consists of a mix of rural residential areas and hobby farms. The streambed substrate consists largely of sand, with patches of gravel in some areas. Although the substrate is undisturbed, the fineness is less suitable for salmon spawning. Pools in California Creek are less than half as frequent as in nearby Dakota Creek. Most of its tributary streams are very small and flow only intermittently.

Much of the creek has been dredged and channelized. Various agricultural ditches connect to the creek carry agricultural runoff, worsening water quality. Along with leakage from septic tanks, agricultural runoff was likely the origin of the elevated levels of fecal coliformbacteria noted in 1990s surveys. Extensive ditch digging and the drainage of wetlands in the California Creek basin has likely increased stormwater runoff, and decreased the watershed's rate of groundwater recharge.

The geology of the California Creek watershed largely consists of glacial sediments. A formation of glacial drift comprising gravel, sand, silt, and clay is present along the coast, dating to between 11,300 and 13,500 years ago, at the end of the Pleistocene. A westward extension of the Sumas outwash plain occupies much of the Dakota Creek and lower California Creek basins, while the upper California Creek basin transitions to fine-grained glacial drift deposits. The creek deposits some fluvial sediments, which are present along the shores near its mouth.

== Biology ==
The shoreline of the lowest portion of California Creek largely consists of urban development, limiting the distribution of trees. Trees (both coniferous and deciduous) and shrubs line the banks further upstream, although the size of the riparian corridor is constrained by nearby agriculture. In portions, tree stands only extend up to 25 ft (7.6 m) from the right bank. The invasive plants spotted knapweed and tansy ragwort were noted to be present along portions of the creek during surveys in the 2000s. Reed canarygrass, a common invasive species across western Washington, is also likely present in the creek.

California Creek is a spawning habitat for various salmonids. Coho salmon historically spawned throughout the stream, with chum salmon noted in the lowest portions. By the mid-1970s, salmon were reported to no longer be present in the river. However, reports in the mid-2000s noted the presence of spawning runs of coho salmon and cutthroat trout, with some evidence of chum salmon in the lower reaches. Char are likely present in isolated portions of the upper creek and its tributaries.

== Human history ==
Prior to Euro-American colonization, the Semiahmoo, one of the Coast Salish peoples, occupied the California Creek basin. A major Semiahmoo village was situated between the mouths of California Creek and Dakota Creek to the north. This area has produced several archaeological finds, including two shell middens, various stone tools, and artifacts from the early historical period such as nails and ceramics.

In 1858, during the Fraser Canyon Gold Rush in the neighboring Canadian province of British Columbia, a group of Americans from California settled in the creek's basin, after whom it was named. Much of the California Creek basin was historically covered by old-growth forest. Most of the basin was cleared for agricultural use; this likely increased water flow to the stream, as such forests can capture around 24–35% of rainfall. Water rights were mainly distributed from the 1930s to 1960s. These were primarily for agricultural irrigation, although a small amount were for domestic use.

Culverts which obstructed fish migration were noted to be present in the creek in a 2002 report. In a 2018 case, Washington v. United States, the Supreme Court ruled that Washington state was obligated to remove culverts which impede salmon migration, in order to fulfill its obligations under Native American fishing treaty rights. The Washington State Department of Transportation began work to remove the culverts in 2020, replacing them with larger, slower culverts designed to allow for fish passage. This opened up an additional 6.5 miles (10.5 km) of spawning habitat in the basin for salmon, and allowed Chinook salmon to utilize the creek.

In 2017, the Whatcom Land Trust and The Conservation Fund purchased 11.5 acres (4.7 ha) around the mouth of the creek to aid in environmental protection and restoration efforts. The land trust had acquired 52.5 acres (21.2 ha) of property around the estuary by 2020, and received federal funding to purchase nearly 55 acres (22 ha) of additional property. The trust aims to open a public park along the western shore of the creek's estuary.
