= Terrell Creek (Washington) =

Location
- Country: United States
- State: Washington
- County: Whatcom

Physical characteristics
- Source: Lake Terrell
- Mouth: Birch Bay, Salish Sea
  - coordinates: 48°55′17″N 122°44′43″W
- Length: 8.7 mi (14.0 km)
- Basin size: 16 sq mi (41 km^{2})

Basin features
- Cities: Birch Bay
- Tributaries
  - right: Fingalson Creek

Terrell Creek is a stream in Whatcom County, Washington, United States. The creek emerges from Lake Terrell, an artificial lake created by a dam on the creek at the site of what was historically a natural lake, and flows through rural residential areas until it empties into the Salish Sea at an urban area in the community of Birch Bay. Its main tributary is the 2.4-mile (3.9 km)-long Fingalson Creek. Various salmonids spawn in Terrell Creek, including coho salmon, cutthroat trout, and steelhead trout, alongside smaller numbers of chum salmon. Salmonid populations declined over the 20th century due to human pressures, and eutrophic water conditions and algae blooms are often present around the late summer. Portions of the Cherry Point Oil Refinery are within the creek's upper watershed, while urban developments and the Birch Bay State Park are present along the lower course.

== Course ==
Terrell Creek drains Lake Terrell, a small lake situated at 213 feet (65 m) above sea level west of the city of Ferndale, Washington. It flows for about 8.7 miles (14.0 km), generally to the west. Emerging from the northern end of the lake, it flows northwest, and immediately takes in a small, unnamed tributary from the east. About 1.9 miles (3.1 km) from its source, Terrell Creek receives its largest tributary, Fingalson Creek, on its right bank. Fingalson Creek is fed by springs and flows west for 2.4 miles (3.9 km) before its confluence with Terrell Creek. Terrell Creek turns after the confluence and flows westward for about 3 miles (4.8 km), before abruptly turning northeast at Birch Bay State Park. For the final 2 miles (3.2 km) of its course, Terrell Creek runs parallel to the shoreline through an urban area in the community of Birch Bay, before turning west and emptying into the Salish Sea at Birch Bay.

== Hydrology ==
The Terrell Creek watershed is roughly 15 to 17 square miles (39 to 44 km^{2}) in area. Terrell Creek is the main source of freshwater within the Birch Bay drainage basin, and by far the largest watershed.

Daily average temperatures in the Birch Bay area range from 30 °F (−1 °C) in December and January to 62 °F (17 °C) in July. The region receives an average of 35 inches (89 cm) of precipitation annually, with the highest amount during December and January, and the lowest during July and August. The geology of the surrounding region is primarily formed by glacial advances and retreats over the course of the Quaternary glaciation, with the last glacial retreat occurring around 12,000 years ago. The southern portion of the Birch Bay drainage area, including Terrell Creek, largely consists of glacial till (fine sediment deposited by glacial movement).

An estuary and salt marsh forms around the creek's mouth on Birch Bay, one of relatively few remaining examples in northwestern Washington. The creek historically had a wide floodplain and stretches of wetland, although much of the floodplain has been constrained or altered by human development. Its heavily meandering lower course was constrained into a set channel by development, likely involving dredging. Algal blooms, decaying seaweed, and pollution such as agricultural runoff frequently result in eutrophic water conditions in the lower portions of the creek during the late summer and early fall, resulting in murky water and a foul, sulfurous odor.

== Biology ==
Various salmonids spawn in Terrell Creek, such as coho salmon, cutthroat trout, and steelhead trout, alongside smaller numbers of chum salmon. Chinook salmon do not spawn in the creek, but have been attested in the estuary. Bull trout are attested in the creek, likely using it for foraging and overwintering, but not for spawning. Besides salmonids, fish such as yellow perch, pumpkinseed, sculpin, and starry flounder have been recorded in the watershed. Some of these originate from fish stocking for recreational fishing purposes at Lake Terrell. The lower portions of the watershed within Birch Bay State Park serve as a habitat for waterfowl and other birds, including great blue herons and bald eagles.

Much of the Terrell Creek riparian forest has been removed by human development. All significant conifer forest along the creek has been removed, with remaining riparian vegetation largely consisting of shrubland and deciduous forest. The lack of conifer stands has resulted in a shortage of large woody debris in the creek, affecting water quality.

== Human history ==
Lake Terrell and Terrell Creek were given their name by early American government surveys of the region, likely after a member of the survey crew. The area around the lake was opened for homesteading and property purchase in 1870, and property owners began to settle in the area over the following years. By the 1920s, the wide and shallow lake had been drained by farming developments. During the 1940s, four dairy farms around Lake Terrell were purchased by the Department of Game (a precursor to the Washington Department of Fish and Wildlife) in order to create a game reserve. The department dammed Terrell Creek, restoring Lake Terrell as a 500-acre (200 ha) artificial lake.

The numbers of salmonid in Terrell Creek declined greatly during the late 20th century due to human pressures. Between 2003 and 2015, three major obstacles to fish passage were remove from the creek.

=== Modern land use ===
Over 60% of the Terrell Creek watershed lies within property owned by the Washington state government and the Cherry Point Oil Refinery, operated by BP. The refinery is located within the otherwise largely undeveloped upper portion of the creek's watershed. The upper watershed and Fingalson Creek sub-basin largely consist of rural residential areas. The creek runs through Birch Bay State Park in its lower course, which features the Terrell Marsh Trail running alongside it.

Most development and residences are located along the lowest reaches of Terrell Creek's course. Much of this area lies within the urban growth boundary of Birch Bay, allowing for medium and high-density residential development. Various drainage and flood control structures, such as culverts and storm drains, are present in this area.
