= Semiahmoo Spit =

Spit in Whatcom County, Washington state

Coordinates: 48°59′N 122°47′W

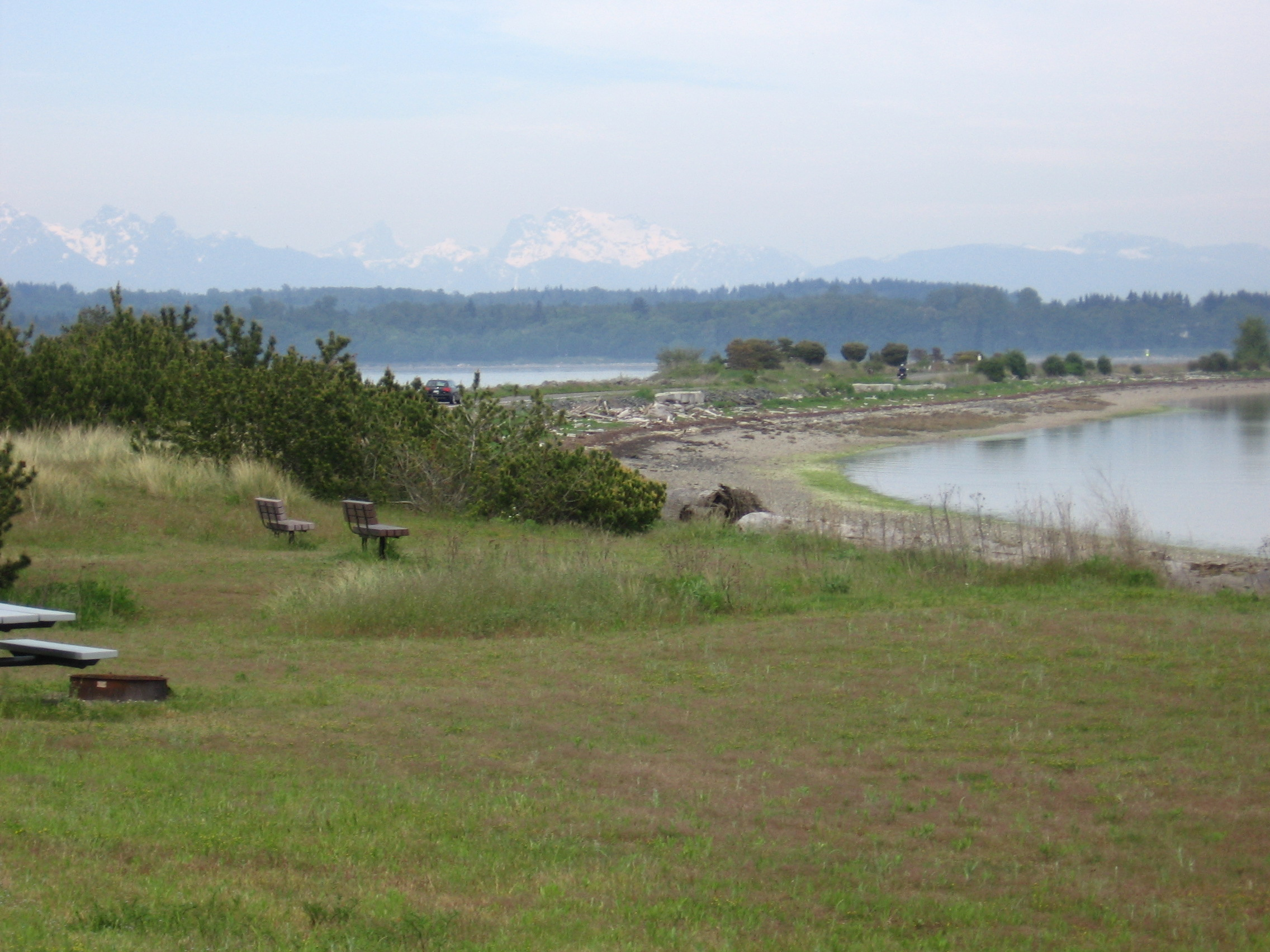
Semiahmoo Spit

Semiahmoo Spit is a spit that protrudes from the westernmost expanse of shore on Semiahmoo Peninsula between Semiahmoo Bay and Drayton Harbor off the coast of Blaine in Whatcom County, Washington state. The spit is home to Semiahmoo Park.

== Geomorphology and geography ==
It is oriented toward the northeast, which means the direction of longshore drift, a constructive geomorphologic process, is northeasterly. Longshore drift through the Strait of Georgia, therefore, tends to be northeasterly. Because waves are mainly powered by wind, the waves approaching Semiahmoo hit the shore obliquely, at an angle of approximately 30 to 45 degrees to the northeast, and thus the prevailing wind through the Strait of Georgia must also be northeasterly. Because of longshore drift, sediments are picked up from the headland and deposited according to size and based on wave energy. High energy wave action can carry large sediment, such as cobbles and gravel, but only as long as the energy exists. Since the waves repeatedly hit the shore, energy is lost, and so larger, denser sediments are quickly deposited near the headland. Smaller, less dense sediment, such as gravel, sand, mud, and clay, can be carried and deposited farther away from the headland because they do not require as much energy for transport. One mile to the north of the tip of the spit is the border between the United States and Canada. Approximately four miles to the northeast of the tip of the spit is the city of White Rock, British Columbia. The spit is approximately 1.25 miles (2.01 km) long and contains approximately 125 acres (0.51 km^{2}) of land.

== History ==
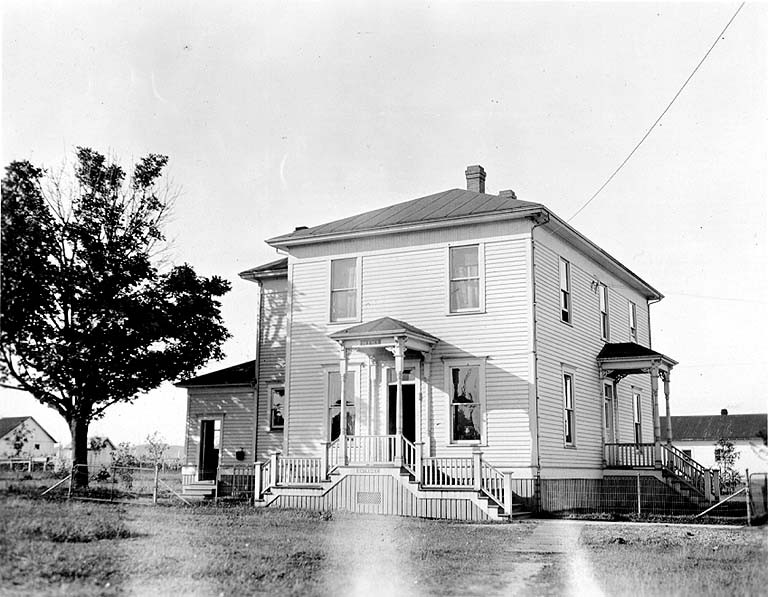
Semiahmoo cannery office, August 1918

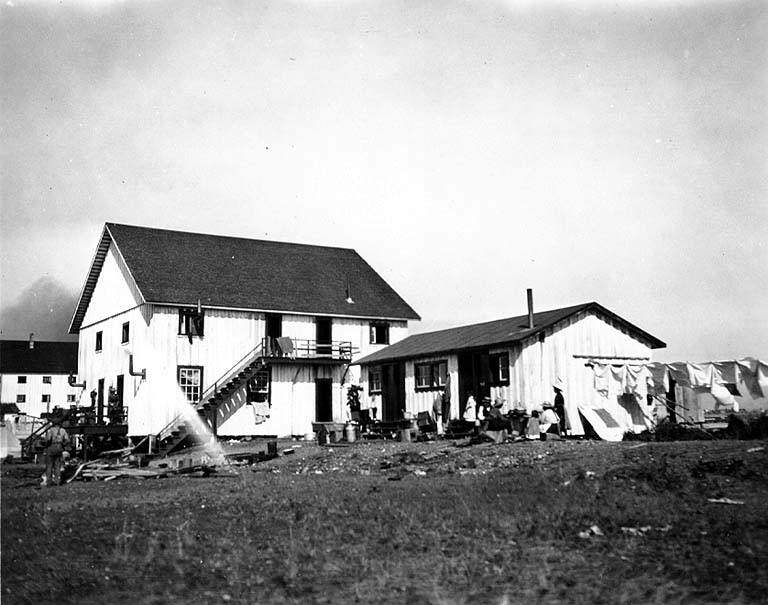
"Native quarters", Semiahmoo cannery

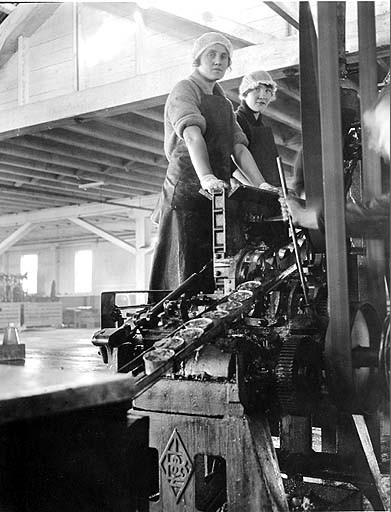
Semiahmoo cannery workers at a filling machine, August 1918

Because of its location, the spit provides access to countless resources that thrive in both the waters of Drayton Harbor, and the ocean currents through the Strait of Georgia. Historically, the Lummi people used the spit for its natural resources; a major village was built on the spit. Today, shell midden is clearly visible in many places, on either side of the spit, as wave action has cut away at the shore, revealing historic artifacts.

In 1858, prospectors came to the Semiahmoo area searching for the Fraser River. The spit seemed like a logical place to set up a post as a launching point for further exploration into the mainland. A trading post was soon established at the spit, and the owner drew up plans for Semiahmoo City. Semiahmoo was expected to become a migration boomtown, but it eventually developed into a fishing town, as the spit provided shelter for Drayton Harbor and an abundance of coastal resources.

In 1880, the Alaska Packers Association destroyed the Lummi village and usurped their village site for a salmon cannery on Semiahmoo Spit.

Whatcom County's first salmon cannery opened in 1881 in Semiahmoo; in 1891, the Alaska Packers Association was the largest salmon cannery in the world. Salmon canning was to be the main source of revenue in Semiahmoo until 1980, when the land was purchased by the land development corporation. Recently, a park with a small, seasonal interpretive center was built near the headland, and the Semiahmoo Resort and Golf Course was built near the spit.

The land at Semiahmoo Spit has been repeatedly used by the City of Blaine for an industrial site and dumping of waste, despite it being the location of an ancient Lummi village and burial ground. It is estimated that as many as 30 percent of the local Lummi people have relatives that were buried in the graveyard, which may date back 4500 years. The problem culminated in 1999, when a contractor hired by the city to build a sewage plant carted away tons of material containing bones and artifacts. Some of it was later found as far away as Colorado. As the restult of a federal lawsuit in 2004, the Lummi Nation received $3.5 million in compensation from the contractor as well as title to two acreas of land on the Semiahmoo Spit.
