= Semiahmoo Bay =

Bay in British Columbia, Canada and Washington, United States

Coordinates: 48°59′59″N 122°49′05″W

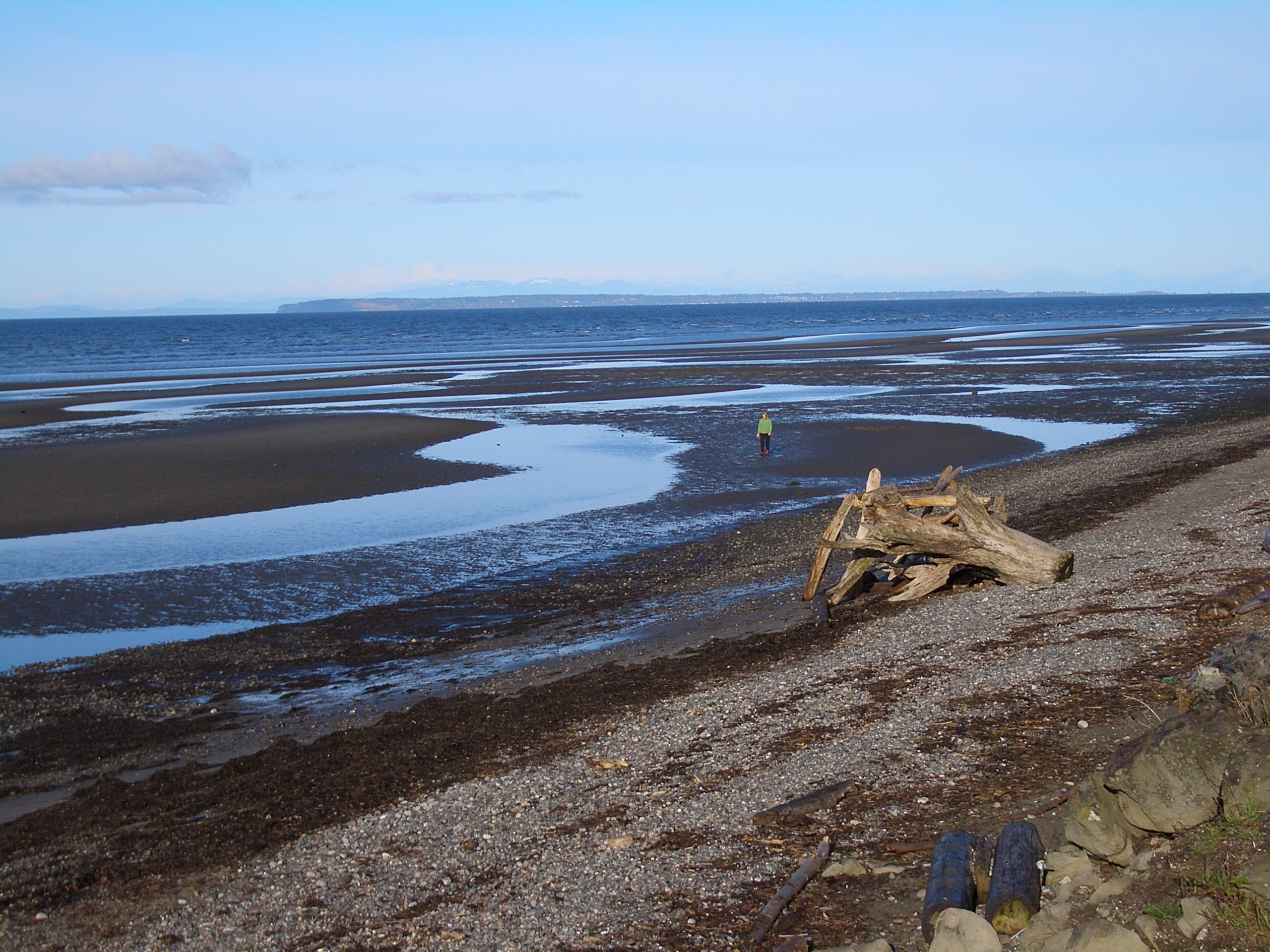
- Semiahmoo Bay, just south of White Rock. Point Roberts can be seen on the horizon
- Interactive map of Semiahmoo Bay
- Etymology: Semiahmoo First Nation
- Part of: Boundary Bay
- Settlements: Surrey, British Columbia White Rock, British Columbia Blaine, Washington

Semiahmoo Bay (/ˌsɛmiˈɑːmoʊ/ SEM-ee-AH-moh) is the southeastern section of Boundary Bay on the Pacific coast of North America in British Columbia, Canada. The bay is named for the Semiahmoo First Nation, who originally occupied the area. The Semiahmoo Peninsula borders the bay and was home to cannery operations. It is now home to the Semiahmoo Golf Resort.

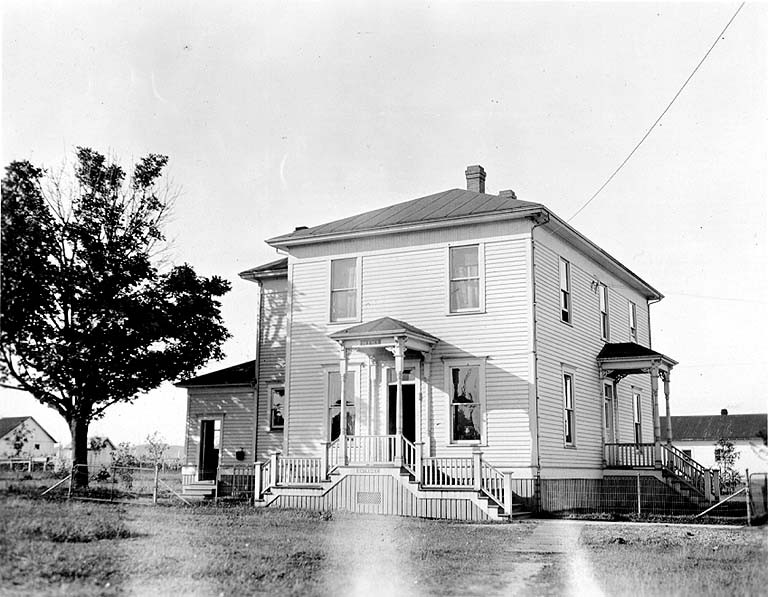
Semiahmoo cannery office along Semiahmoo Bay, August 1918

From the north to south, the following communities and places are located on its shore:

- North of the border, in British Columbia:
  - the Crescent Beach and Ocean Park neighbourhoods of the city of Surrey
  - the city of White Rock
  - the Semiahmoo Indian Reserve of the Semiahmoo First Nation
  - Peace Arch Provincial Park
- South of the border, in Washington State:
  - Peace Arch State Park
  - Blaine

Blaine's Drayton Harbor opens into Semiahmoo Bay; the harbor is separated from the main body of the bay by Semiahmoo Spit. The Semiahmoo Resort is located south of the spit.

The Washington State Department of Ecology classified the marine waters within Semiahmoo Bay, outside of Drayton Harbor, as extraordinary quality waters for (1) salmonid and other fish migration, rearing, and spawning; (2) clam, oyster, and mussel rearing and spawning; and (3) crustaceans and other shellfish (crabs, shrimp, crayfish, and scallops) rearing and spawning.

The Campbell River flows into Semiahmoo Bay on the Canadian side; California Creek and Dakota Creek flow into Drayton Harbor on the US side.
