= Birch Bay State Park =

State park in Washington

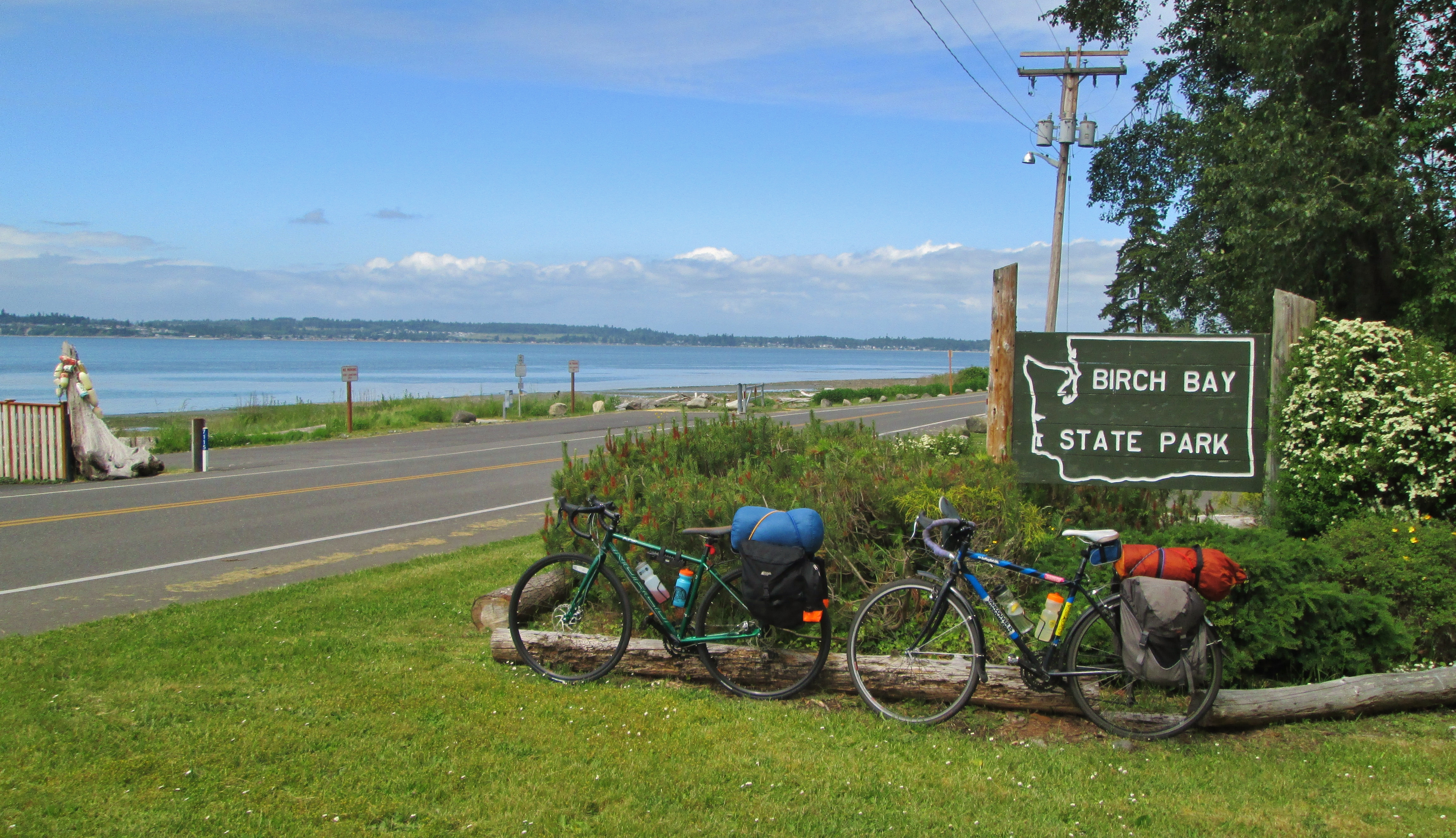
- Birch Bay State Park sign
- Interactive map of Birch Bay State Park
- Location: Whatcom County, Washington, United States
- Nearest city: Blaine, Washington
- Coordinates: 48°54′32″N 122°45′47″W
- Area: 225.1 acres (91.1 ha)
- Established: 1954
- Administrator: Washington State Parks and Recreation Commission
- Visitors: 792,002 (in 2025)
- Website: Official website

Birch Bay State Park is a 225.1-acre (91.1 ha) Washington state park located nine miles (14 km) south of Blaine in Whatcom County, within the town of Birch Bay. The park has 7,915 feet (2,412 m) of saltwater shoreline on Birch Bay and 15,000 feet (4,600 m) of freshwater shoreline along Terrell Creek. Recreational opportunities include camping, picnicking, fishing, hiking, crabbing, clamming, and boating.

An archeological site, 45-WH-9, or as it was called by the native peoples of the area, Strav-a-wa, is located within Birch Bay State Park. It is one of the largest sites in the area, and despite having been recorded since 1963, little archeological work has been done. Most work was done in 1975 and 1976, finding large amounts of Canis Lupus Familiaris bones.
