= Dakota Creek =

Location
- Country: United States
- State: Washington
- County: Whatcom

Physical characteristics
- Mouth: Drayton Harbor
  - location: Blaine, Washington
  - coordinates: 48°58′23″N 122°44′2″W
- Length: 11.3 mi (18.2 km) (including south fork); 5.3 mi (8.5 km) (mainstem)
- Basin size: 29.0 sq mi (75 km^{2})

Basin features
- Tributaries
  - right: North Fork Dakota Creek

Dakota Creek is a stream in northwestern Whatcom County, Washington, United States. The north fork originates in a series of small forested hills near the border with British Columbia, and flows southwest for about 5 miles (8.0 km). The south fork flows through agricultural countryside for about 6 miles (9.7 km), taking in various small unnamed tributaries, until it meets the north fork to form the mainstem Dakota Creek. The mainstem creek winds through farmland and forest, taking in various other small tributaries, before emptying into the Salish Sea at Drayton Harbor in the city of Blaine, Washington.

Various salmonids spawn in Dakota Creek, including Chinook salmon, coho salmon, chum salmon, and coastal cutthroat trout. The Dakota Creek watershed is within the traditional territory of the Semiahmoo people, who constructed a village south of the stream's mouth. The creek was named for a group of American homesteaders from the Dakotas who settled in the area during the early 1870s. After colonization, the old-growth forest which covered much of the watershed was cleared for agricultural purposes, especially dairy farming. Development has disrupted wetland habitat around the watershed, while agricultural runoff has led to poor water quality.

== Course ==
Dakota Creek originates from the confluence of its north and south forks, both originating in springs and surface runoff in a series of low hills near the city of Blaine, Washington. South Fork Dakota Creek originates 11 mi (18 km) to the southeast of Blaine, and flows northwest through rural agricultural land for about 6 miles (9.7 km) before it meets the north fork, taking in several small, unnamed tributary streams. North Fork Dakota Creek originates in forested hills near the border with the Canadian province of British Columbia and flows southwest for about 5 miles (8.0 km), also taking in several small tributaries.

The mainstem Dakota Creek takes a winding course northwest for 5.3 miles (8.5 km) from the confluence, through a mix of deciduous forest and farmland. It takes in two small ditches from the south and various larger tributaries from the north. A little over a mile from the confluence, it takes in an unnamed 3.4-mile (5.5 km) long tributary which originates in the hills near the Canadian border. It takes in another unnamed tributary, 3.3 miles (5.3 km) long, as it turns westward about 3.7 miles (6.0 km) from the confluence. After passing under the highway Interstate 5 a little over 4 miles (6.4 km) from the confluence, it passes through an urban residential area of the city of Blaine, Washington, and empties into the Salish Sea at Drayton Harbor.

== Hydrology ==
The watershed area of the mainstem Dakota Creek, including its forks and tributaries, totals to 29.0 square miles (75 km^{2}). The drainage basin of the south fork covers 8.25 square miles (21.4 km^{2}), while the north fork measures 7.92 square miles (20.5 km^{2}). About 0.41 square miles (1.1 km^{2}) of the north fork basin lie within British Columbia. Although much of the north fork basin remains as relatively untouched forestland, much of the main stem and south fork basins have been converted for agricultural use, including pastureland. Including the mudflats around the creek's mouth, about 21% of the Dakota Creek watershed is made up of wetlands.

Dakota Creek exhibits a pool and riffle sequence across much of its course, with some reaches relatively deep and slow-moving. The streambed substrate is largely gravel and sand, with larger rubble in some areas. The water level of the creek throughout the year reflects precipitation, reaching its lowest point in the late summer and early fall. Some smaller tributaries dry up in the summer. Storms in winter regularly flood the watershed, causing significant erosion along the riverbanks.

=== Water quality ===
Agricultural runoff has resulted in significant water contamination, with high levels of ammonia and fecal coliform bacteria recorded by surveys in the 1990s. Two fish kill events were recorded by the early 1990s due to overuse of pesticide by surrounding dairy farms. A high level of cadmium was reported in the stream in 1995, of unclear origin. By 2002, the riparian conditions of the creek were tentatively classified as poor, with excessively high water temperatures recorded, alongside significant modifications to the natural floodplain. By 2014, water quality concerns remained due to dissolved oxygen and pH levels, alongside high temperatures.

== Biology ==
Much of the shoreline of the lower portions of Dakota Creek is lined with wooded areas, with tree cover extending between 10 to 20 feet (3.0 to 6.1 m) from the stream in the thinnest areas, and beyond 200 feet (61 m) in the widest, especially upstream from the city limits of Blaine. The trees of these forested areas are largely conifers, although the watershed of the north fork, and some areas of the northern shore of the main stem, is primarily covered by deciduous trees. The creek's mouth is used by various shorebirds and dabbling ducks. Portions of the creek lie within the range of bald eagles.

Various species of salmonid spawn in Dakota Creek. Coho salmon spawn across all accessible areas of the creek, while a fall run of Chinook salmon are known to spawn in the north fork up to 3.4 miles (5.5 km) upstream from the confluence. Both resident and anadromous (migratory) coastal cutthroat trout spawn in the creek, with anadromous cutthroat trout generally entering from November to March, and spawning from January through April. A small winter run of steelhead trout was historically recorded in the creek, although its present status is unknown. Chum salmon also spawn in Dakota Creek, while char are thought to be present along the mouth of the creek and tributary streams.

== Human history ==
Prior to Euro-American colonization, the Semiahmoo, one of the Coast Salish peoples, occupied the Dakota Creek basin. A major Semiahmoo village was situated between the mouths of Dakota Creek and the nearby California Creek to the south. This area has produced several archaeological finds, including two shell middens, various stone tools, and artifacts from the early historical period such as nails and ceramics. Further upstream, past the present location of Interstate 5, the remains of an indigenous fishing weir have been found.

Dakota Creek was named for a group of homesteaders from the Dakota Territory who settled in the watershed around 1872. Much of the basin was historically covered by old-growth forest. Large portions of the basin were cleared for agricultural use; this likely increased water flow to the stream, as such forests can capture around 24–35% of rainfall. Water rights were distributed to landowners from the 1920s to 1950s for irrigation. Wetlands, especially within the mainstem and south fork watersheds, have been heavily affected by human development. Wetland area has been reduced by reclamation efforts and agriculture, alongside road and building construction.

A 2006 survey found relatively limited shoreline modifications along the lower 6.2 miles (10.0 km) of Dakota Creek and its south fork. No dikes or levees have been constructed, although a submerged dam and several small surface water diversions have been constructed. The watershed is dominated by dairy farming.
