= Semiahmoo Resort =

Resort and spa near Blaine, Washington

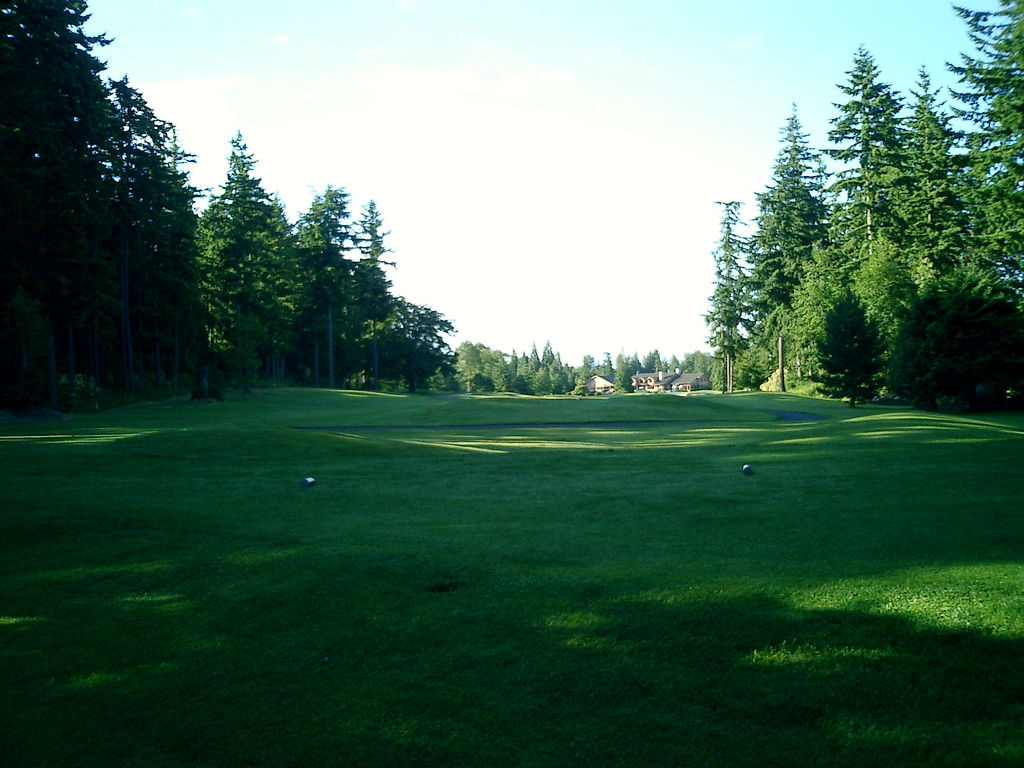

- Location within Washington (state)

General information
- Type: Golfing resort and spa
- Location: Blaine, Washington, United States
- Coordinates: 48°59′21″N 122°46′25″W

Website
- www.semiahmoo.com

Semiahmoo Resort is a golfing resort and spa overlooking Semiahmoo Bay, opposite Blaine, Washington, northwest of Bellingham in the northwestern coast of the United States. Set within 1,100 acres (450 ha), it lies on a long sandy spit in the northern part of Puget Sound near the Canada–US border. The name of the resort is from the Semiahmoo indigenous people in whose Salish language it is the word for "half moon" and describes the crescent shaped land the resort was built on.

Semiahmoo Resort opened in 1987 and is home to the Semiahmoo Golf and Country Club, set further south of the sandy spit along the coast. The Semiahmoo golf course was designed by Arnold Palmer and was voted the 6th best golf course in Washington state by Golfweek in 2011. The resort hosts the Jeff Coston Academy, a notable golf academy. The AAA four diamond hotel, located at Semiahmoo Point, has 198 deluxe guest rooms including 28 suites.

The resort has become a popular residence for Americans who work for Vancouver area companies who are willing to commute across an international border due to the extreme housing costs in Vancouver.

The hotel, restaurants and spa closed effective December 1, 2012. In June 2013, The Resort Semiahmoo LLC, a part of the Wright Hotels group of Seattle, Washington purchased the hotel for $19.5 million. With $6 million of planned renovations in place, the resort officially re-opened for limited operations on August 15, 2013.

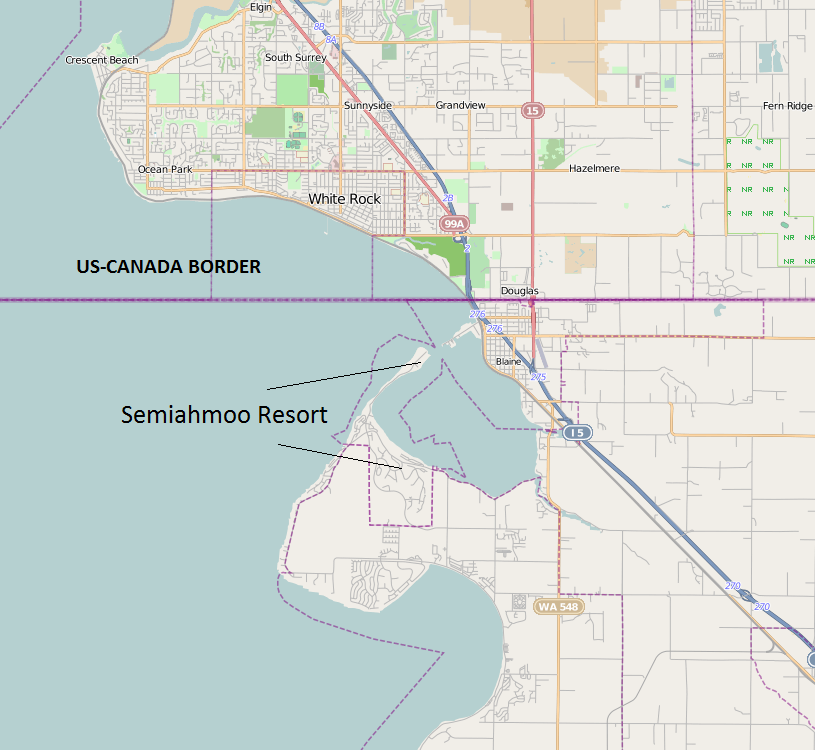
Location

In January, 2014, the Pacific Northwest Resort began a $9 million renovation project.

In the summer of 2016 the resort opened a beach activities center located in one of the existing cannery buildings. Operations are during summer months with hours from 11 am to 2 pm Monday through Thursday and from 10 am to 5 pm Friday to Sunday.

For years, the resort owned the Loomis Trail Golf Course, located approximately 4 miles east of the Semiahmoo Golf & Country Club. The Lummi Indian Business Council announced it had purchased the Loomis Trail Golf Course in October, 2018.
