= Riffle-pool sequence =

Hydrological flow structure

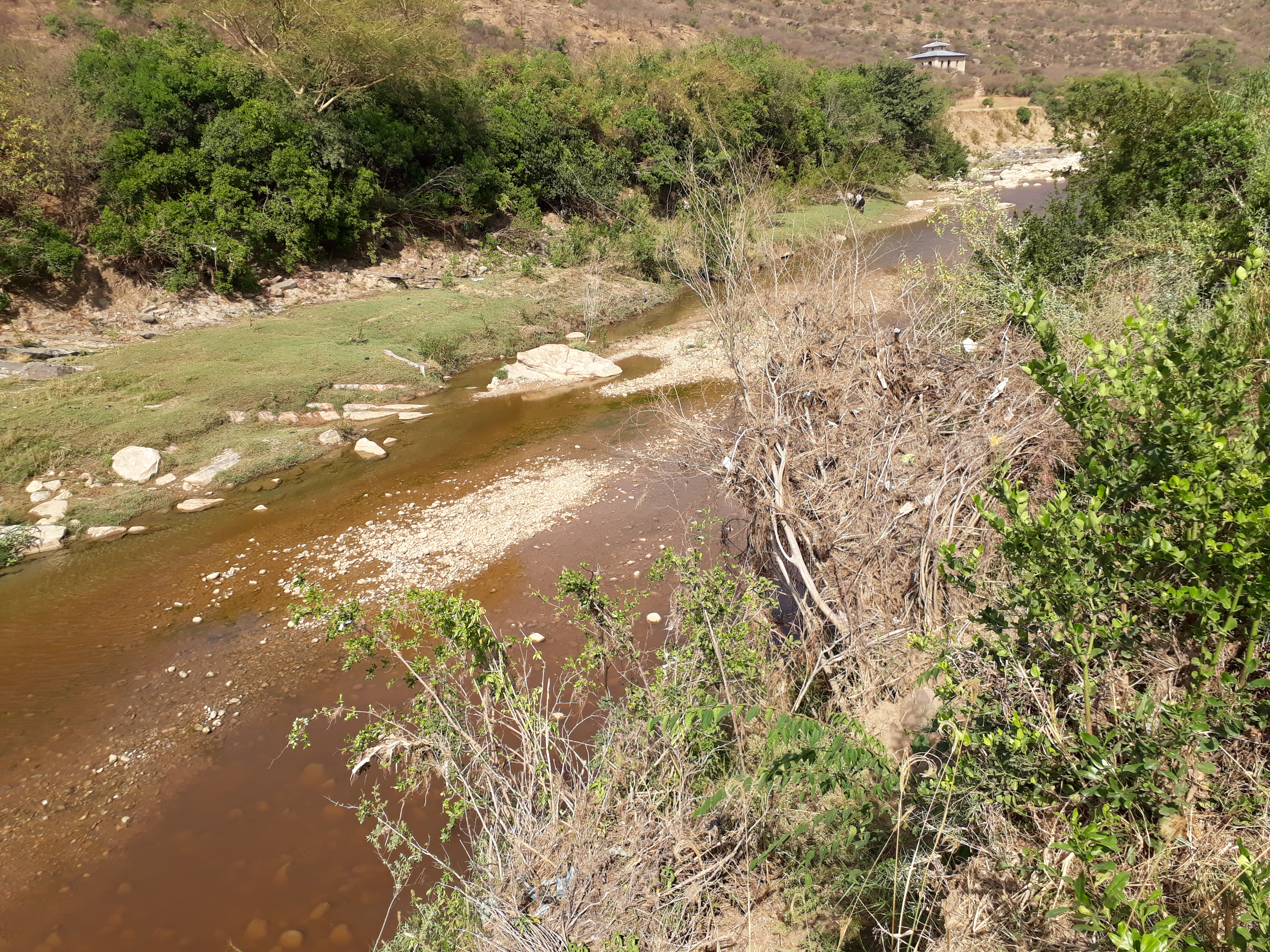
Two pools separated by a riffle in Giba river in Ethiopia

In a flowing stream, a riffle-pool sequence (also known as a pool-riffle sequence) develops as a stream's hydrological flow structure alternates between areas of relatively shallow and deeper water. This sequence is present only in streams carrying gravel or coarser sediments. Riffles are formed in shallow areas by coarser materials, such as gravel deposits, over which water flows. Pools are deeper, calmer areas whose bed load (in general) is made up of finer material such as silt. Streams with only sand or silt laden beds do not develop the feature. The sequence within a stream bed commonly occurs at intervals of from 5 to 7 stream widths. Meandering streams with relatively coarse bed load tend to develop a riffle-pool sequence with pools in the outsides of the bends and riffles in the crossovers between one meander to the next on the opposite margin of the stream. The pools are areas of active erosion and the material eroded tends to be deposited in the riffle areas between them.

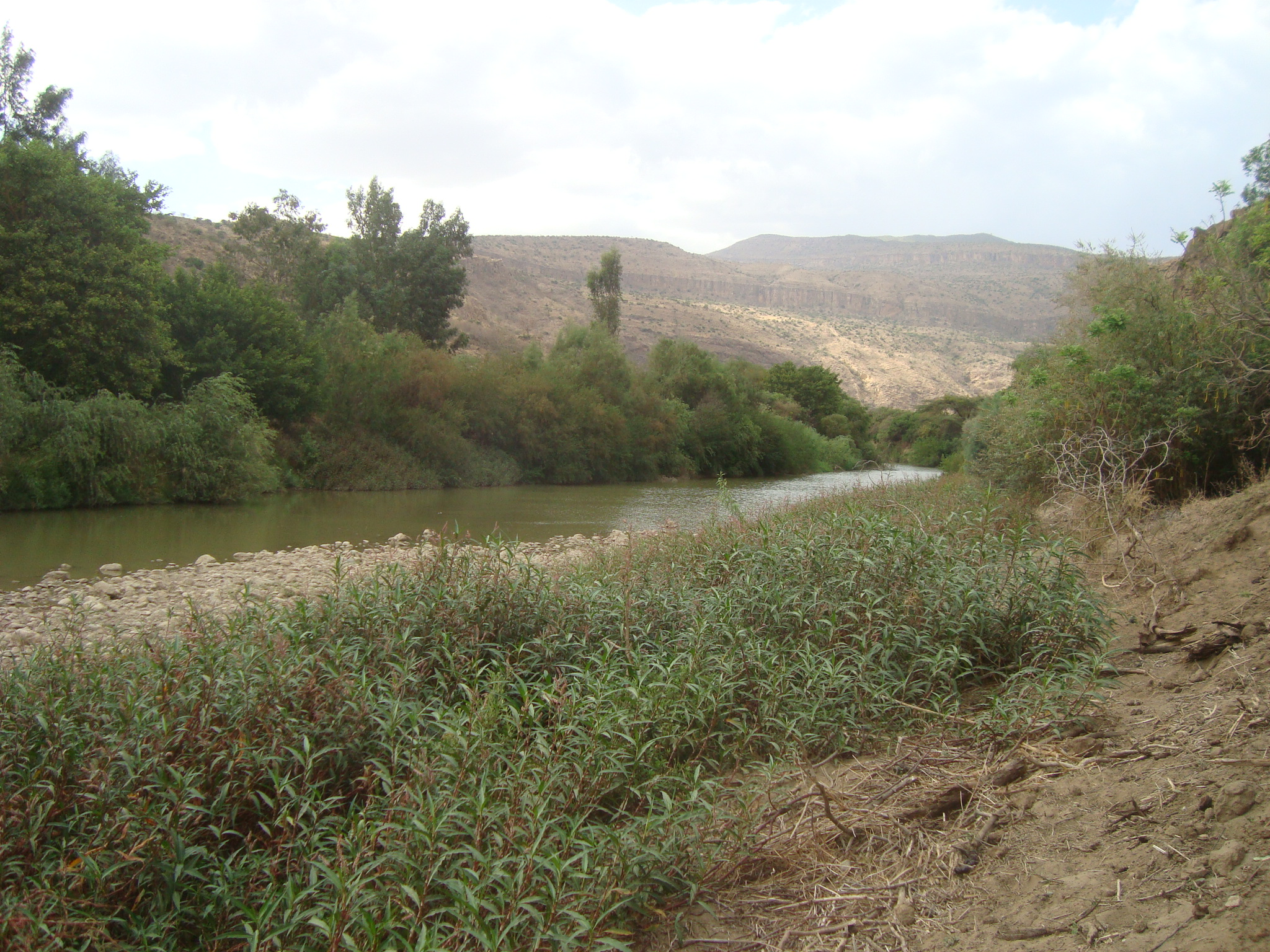
Pool in Giba River, Dogu'a Tembien, Ethiopia
