= Birch Bay, Washington =

- CDP
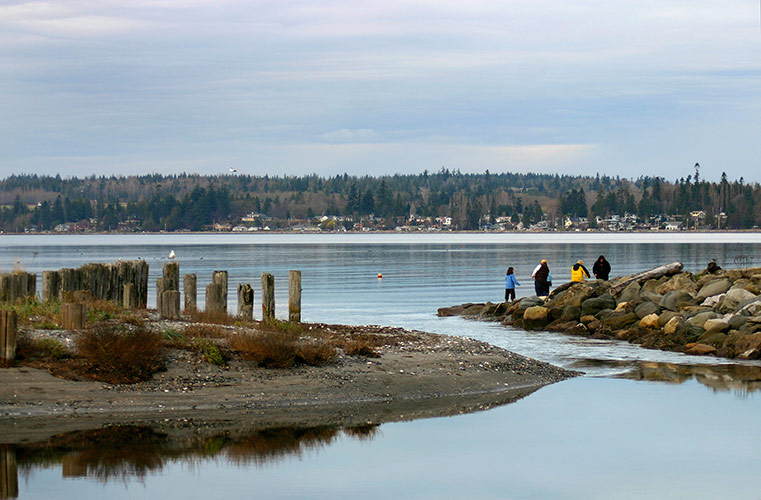
- Birch Bay in 2008

- Location of Birch Bay within Whatcom County, Washington
- Coordinates: 48°54′56″N 122°44′50″W
- Country: United States
- State: Washington
- County: Whatcom

Area
  - Total: 21.2 sq mi (54.9 km^{2})
  - Land: 15.8 sq mi (41.0 km^{2})
  - Water: 5.4 sq mi (14.0 km^{2})
- Elevation: 0 ft (0 m)

Population (2020)
  - Total: 10,115
  - Density: 639/sq mi (247/km^{2})
- Time zone: UTC-8 (Pacific (PST))
  - Summer (DST): UTC-7 (PDT)
- ZIP Code: 98230
- Area code: 360, 564
- FIPS code: 53-06190
- GNIS feature ID: 2407850

Birch Bay (Tsan-wuch, Say-wak) is a census-designated place (CDP) along the shore of the bay named Birch Bay in Whatcom County, Washington, United States. As of the 2020 census, the population was 10,115, a 20.2% increase from 8,413 total people in the 2010 census.

== History ==
Local indigenous communities named this place Say-wak, meaning "people saved from a flood by building a raft."

Captains of Spanish ships from Acapulco and San Blas (Spanish west coast ports in Mexico) were in this area in 1791 and 1792 and named it Puerto del Garzon in 1791 by captain Jose Maria Narvaez. It was then renamed Birch Bay in 1792 by Archibald Menzies, a member of the Vancouver Expedition. Vancouver's two ships used Birch Bay as an anchorage for several days. Menzies noted a number of species of birch and gave the name to the bay.

In the 2000s, the development of condominiums and vacation homes became more prominent in Birch Bay due to high demand from wealthier clientele in the United States and Canada. A proposal to incorporate the community as a city was announced in 2023 following earlier attempts and discussion. By 2020, Birch Bay had grown to approximately 10,000 people, making it larger than all but three cities in Whatcom County.

== Geography ==
Birch Bay is on the Salish Sea in northwestern Whatcom County, about 6 miles (9.7 km) south of the Canada–United States border and 37 miles (60 km) from Vancouver, British Columbia. The community that surrounds the bay is connected by State Route 548, a short highway that runs between two interchanges on Interstate 5 near Ferndale and in Blaine.

According to the United States Census Bureau, the CDP has a total area of 21.2 square miles (55 km^{2}), of which, 15.8 square miles (41 km^{2}) of it is land and 5.4 square miles (14 km^{2}) of it (25.45%) is water.

=== Geology ===
Birch Bay is a headland bay created by the refraction of incoming waves on the headlands that lie on either side of the bay. The headland to the north is Birch Point, and the one to the south is Point Whitehorn. The waves bend as they enter the bay and lose energy in the process. The result is a half-moon-shaped bay with a gentle sloping beach. The shoreline has been modified in past years by the implementation of perpendicular structures called groins, and riprap. Terrell Creek runs parallel along a section of the beach, eventually flowing into the bay.

== Demographics ==
Historical population
Census	Pop.	Note	%±
1990	2,656		—
2000	4,961		86.8%
2010	8,413		69.6%
2020	10,115		20.2%
U.S. Decennial Census; 1970 1980 1990; 2000 2010 2020

Birch Bay first appeared as a census-designated place in the 1990 U.S. census.

=== Racial and ethnic composition ===
Birch Bay CDP, Washington – Racial and ethnic composition Note: the US Census treats Hispanic/Latino as an ethnic category. This table excludes Latinos from the racial categories and assigns them to a separate category. Hispanics/Latinos may be of any race.
Race / Ethnicity (NH = Non-Hispanic)	Pop 2000	Pop 2010	Pop 2020	% 2000	% 2010	% 2020
White alone (NH)	4,475	7,139	7,932	90.20%	84.86%	78.42%
Black or African American alone (NH)	50	77	111	1.01%	0.92%	1.10%
Native American or Alaska Native alone (NH)	50	91	126	1.01%	1.08%	1.25%
Asian alone (NH)	61	270	344	1.23%	3.21%	3.40%
Native Hawaiian or Pacific Islander alone (NH)	7	28	26	0.14%	0.33%	0.26%
Other race alone (NH)	8	7	87	0.16%	0.08%	0.86%
Mixed race or Multiracial (NH)	89	280	644	1.79%	3.33%	6.37%
Hispanic or Latino (any race)	221	521	845	4.45%	6.19%	8.35%
Total	4,961	8,413	10,115	100.00%	100.00%	100.00%

=== 2020 census ===
As of the 2020 census, Birch Bay had a population of 10,115. The median age was 49.7 years. 18.4% of residents were under the age of 18 and 25.8% of residents were 65 years of age or older. For every 100 females there were 98.0 males, and for every 100 females age 18 and over there were 96.2 males age 18 and over.

92.1% of residents lived in urban areas, while 7.9% lived in rural areas.

There were 4,350 households in Birch Bay, of which 22.1% had children under the age of 18 living in them. Of all households, 52.8% were married-couple households, 16.9% were households with a male householder and no spouse or partner present, and 23.7% were households with a female householder and no spouse or partner present. About 27.4% of all households were made up of individuals and 14.4% had someone living alone who was 65 years of age or older.

There were 5,904 housing units, of which 26.3% were vacant. The homeowner vacancy rate was 1.6% and the rental vacancy rate was 6.6%.

Racial composition as of the 2020 census
Race	Number	Percent
White	8,179	80.9%
Black or African American	111	1.1%
American Indian and Alaska Native	147	1.5%
Asian	352	3.5%
Native Hawaiian and Other Pacific Islander	28	0.3%
Some other race	311	3.1%
Two or more races	987	9.8%

=== 2000 census ===
As of the census of 2000, there were 4,961 people, 2,125 households, and 1,417 families residing in the CDP. The population density was 313.7 people per square mile (121.1 people/km^{2}). There were 5,105 housing units at an average density of 322.8 units per square mile (124.6 units/km^{2}). The racial makeup of the CDP was 92.36% White, 1.23% Asian, 1.19% Native American, 1.05% African American, 0.14% Pacific Islander, 1.91% from other races, and 2.12% from two or more races. Hispanic or Latino of any race were 4.45% of the population.

There were 2,125 households, out of which 27.0% had children under the age of 18 living with them, 53.5% were married couples living together, 9.3% had a female householder with no husband present, and 33.3% were non-families. 26.4% of all households were made up of individuals, and 8.2% had someone living alone who was 65 years of age or older. The average household size was 2.33 and the average family size was 2.80.

In the CDP, the age distribution of the population shows 23.2% under the age of 18, 6.2% from 18 to 24, 27.0% from 25 to 44, 27.7% from 45 to 64, and 15.9% who were 65 years of age or older. The median age was 41 years. For every 100 females, there were 97.4 males. For every 100 females age 18 and over, there were 92.9 males.

The median income for a household in the CDP was $40,040, and the median income for a family was $44,280. Males had a median income of $41,198 versus $27,076 for females. The per capita income for the CDP was $21,204. About 6.7% of families and 9.4% of the population were below the poverty line, including 13.7% of those under age 18 and 0.9% of those age 65 or over.

== Education ==
The majority of the community is served by the Blaine School District. A piece in the east is in the Ferndale School District.

== See also ==
- Birch Bay State Park
- Cherry Point Refinery
- Birch Bay Waterslides
