= Campbell River (Semiahmoo Bay) =

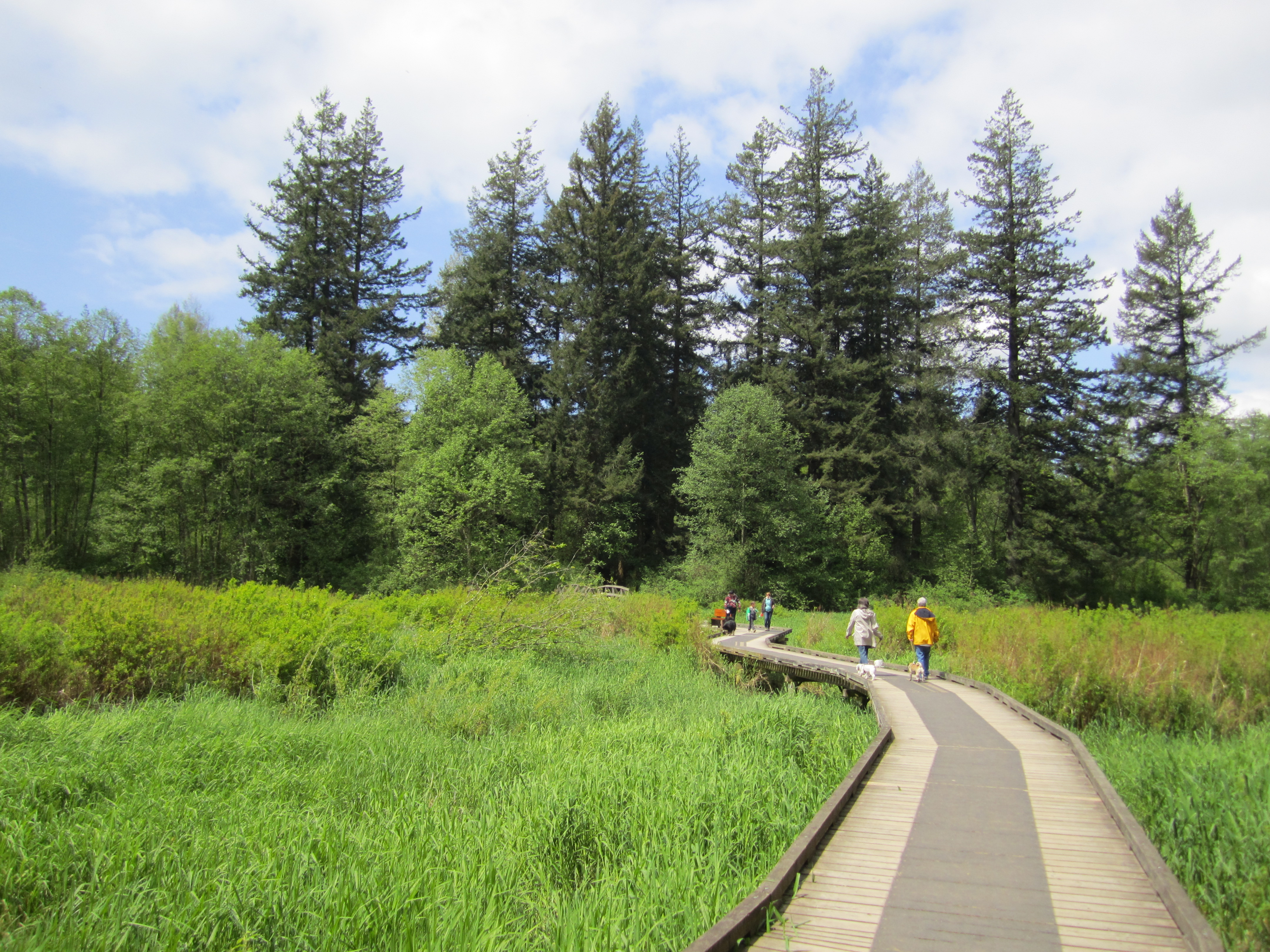
- Footbridge over the river, at Little Campbell River Park

Location
- Country: Canada
- Province: British Columbia
- District: New Westminster Land District

Physical characteristics
- Source
  - location: Lower Mainland
- Mouth: Semiahmoo Bay
  - location: Boundary Bay
  - coordinates: 49°0′45″N 122°46′41″W
  - elevation: 5 m (16 ft)

The Campbell River passes through Surrey and Langley, British Columbia, Canada, entering Semiahmoo Bay at the Semiahmoo Indian Reserve, which lies between the City of White Rock and Peace Arch Park on the international boundary.

Originally labelled Campbell Creek in 1917 by the Geographic Board of Canada, it was labelled Tahtaloo on International Boundary Survey sheet 2 (date not cited) (a toponym derived from Tah-tu-lo, the Semiahmoo endonym for their dialect of Straits Salish); variant spellings include Tahla too, Tah-la-loo, and Tah tu lo. It was probably named after Archibald Campbell, US commissioner in the joint negotiations to locate the international boundary 1857–1862, who had his camp at the mouth of the creek. It was identified in the field notes of Joseph Trutch's survey as Semiahmoo Creek in 1859. "Ta’talu" is the name used nowadays by the Semiahmoo First Nation residing in its vicinity.

== Tributaries (listed from the mouth up) ==
- Fergus Creek
- Sand Hill Creek

== See also ==
- List of rivers of British Columbia
- Serpentine River
- Nicomekl River
- Campbell Valley Regional Park
