= Semiahmoo First Nation =

First Nation in British Columbia, Canada

Coordinates: 49°00′40″N 122°45′55″W

- Band No. 569
- SEMYOME
- People: Semiahmoo people
- Headquarters: Surrey
- Province: British Columbia

Land
- Other reserve: Semiahmoo Indian Reserve
- Land area: 1.29 km^{2} (0.50 sq mi)

Population (2021)
- On reserve: 50
- Off reserve: 51
- Total population: 101

Government
- Chief: Harley Chappell
- Council: Joanne Charles; Jennine Cook

Website
- semiahmoofirstnation.ca

Semiahmoo First Nation (/ˌsɛmiˈɑːmuː/ SEM-ee-AH-moo) is the band government of the Semiahmoo people, a Coast Salish subgroup. The band's main community and offices are located on the 312 acres (1.3 km^{2}) Semiahmoo Indian Reserve which is sandwiched between the boundary of White Rock, British Columbia and the Canada–United States boundary and Peace Arch Provincial Park.

== Demographics ==
In 1790, Europeans estimated the Semiahmoo population at 300. By 1854, the band's numbers were reduced to 250 due to smallpox and warfare. In 1909 there were 38 band members in British Columbia. In 1963, the number had reached 28 and then just 25 by 1971. Between 1996 and 2001, the reserve population dropped 34.5 per cent, from 200 people to 131, and currently they have 98 registered members and 53 members who live on site

The Semiahmoo remain one of the smallest First Nations in the region with about 74 band members, of whom 40 live on Reserve. In fact, Semiahmoo has more non-Aboriginals living on its reserve than band members. As of 2003, the median age of the Semiahmoo population was 42.5 years: higher than the average for all people living on Indian Reserves in Greater Vancouver (which was 39.2 years).

== Reserve and governance ==
The Semiahmoo Reserve was established by the Canadian government in 1887. Haida artist Robert Davidson currently works from a studio on the reserve.

From 1942 to 1996, 172 acres (0.7 km^{2}) or more than half the reserve's area was leased by the band to the Municipality of Surrey for recreational "parkland" purposes. The City of White Rock and the City of Surrey both used the land, known as "Semiahmoo Park" for landfill and municipal infrastructure purposes. In 2014, the First Nation announced that it was endeavouring to remediate the soil which was contaminated by the municipalities' usage.

== Relations with federal government ==
In 2003/04, the Semiahmoo received $243,500 in federal funding.

In 2006, the Semiahmoo reserve was listed by Indian and Northern Affairs Canada as a high-priority community for drinking-water improvements. The Canadian government committed to assisting the Semiahmoo with its high-risk drinking water system.

In 2014, the First Nation criticized the federal government's new requirements for annual public transparency about the band's expenditures. Until the new regulations took effect, the most recent public financial documents were related to 2006 ($225,420 in federal funding). Although the band claimed to have mailed their report by the November 2014 deadline, the federal government had listed them among the 42 bands that had not submitted information. In August 2015, shortly after the start of the federal election campaign, the Semiahmoo First Nation's financial report received national attention due to the $267,309 tax-free remuneration in 2013/14 to Chief Willard Cook which may have represented the highest compensation to a politician in Canada.

== Treaty negotiations ==
A June 2003 report for the Greater Vancouver Regional District indicated that the Semiahmoo First Nation is not affiliated with any tribal council and is not involved in treaty negotiations.

However, a 2007 newspaper article said that the Semiahmoo First Nation and three other First Nations (Tsartlip, Tsawout and Pauquachin) make up the Sencot'en Alliance, which says their traditional territory stretches south to the northern end of Puget Sound, including both the San Juan Islands and the Gulf Islands, across southern Vancouver Island to include sites north of the Canada/U.S. border, on the lower Fraser River and on all adjacent land.

Members of the Sencot'en Alliance also indicate that they are signatories to the Douglas Treaties, taken with the British Crown from 1850 to 1854, and are not involved with the current B.C. Treaty Commission negotiations.

In 2007, the Semiahmoo publicly expressed strong opposition to the Tsawwassen First Nation treaty, stating the agreement with the Delta first nation could infringe on its territory and rights.

== Relations with Surrey, White Rock ==
School District 36 Surrey acknowledges that it operates in the Semiahmoo traditional territory.

The First Nation sponsors a powwow organized by students at Earl Marriott Secondary School in Surrey.

In 2009, the band removed a large and long-standing dog park located in an open park near the East beach area citing vandalism as the reason for removal. Removal of the remaining swings would follow soon after.

In 2010, the Semiahmoo First Nation erected a 6 foot high fence that extends east from the reservation and follows the length of their land to prohibit access by non-band members. In addition to restricting access to band land, this fence also prevents access to all East beach areas and certain areas of the Little Campbell River.

In 2013, the First Nation threatened legal action if the City of Surrey approved construction of a $100 million casino (a developer's proposal eventually refused by city council) near King George Boulevard a few kilometres away from the reserve. Concerns were that it might affect the First Nation's plans to build a five-star hotel, conference centre and gaming centre on the reserve near the US border.

In 2015, Semiahmoo appealed to the City of Surrey for connection to the Metro Vancouver water system after the City of White Rock announced future termination of their city's water system connection to the Indian Reserve.

In 2018, Semiahmoo struck a deal with the City of Surrey, which will provide water and sewage connection to Semiahmoo from 2019. Construction started soon after and was completed by early 2021. On March 31, 2021, the Boiled Water Advisory that was in effect since 2005 has been lifted.

=== Aboriginal policing ===
The Surrey detachment of the Royal Canadian Mounted Police provides policing service through the Surrey First Nation Policing Service to both the Semiahmoo First Nation and Tsawwassen First Nation under tripartite framework agreements.

The Provincial Auxiliary Constable Program has five Auxiliary Constables on the reserve.

The Semiahmoo First Nation uses an Apology Ceremony to deal with minor offences committed within the community. The offender must make an apology to the victim and those who have been affected. The offender provides a gift to the victims and prepares a meal. After the gift is presented a meal is provided that is prepared by the offender. The Chief and Council, Elders, and community members are involved in the ceremony.

== See also ==
- Coast Salish peoples
- Musqueam Indian Band
- Kwantlen First Nation
- Lummi
- Halkomelem (language)
- North Straits Salish (language)
- Sto:lo Nation
- Tsawwassen First Nation
