= Fish War =

2024 American documentary film

- Directed by: Charles Atkinson, Jeff Ostenson, and Skylar Wagner
- Produced by: Kari Neumeyer, Jeff Ostenson, Tiffany Royal
- Cinematography: Charles Atkinson
- Edited by: Skylar Wagner
- Music by: Black Belt Eagle Scout
- Release date: May 11, 2024 (Seattle)
- Running time: 79 minutes
- Country: United States
- Language: English

Fish War (stylized FISH WAR) is a 2024 American documentary film about a series of civil disobedience protests by tribes in the Pacific Northwest region of the United States during the 1960s and 1970s, called the Fish Wars. The film was produced by Northwest Treaty Tribes Media and North Forty Productions, and had its world premiere on May 11, 2024 at the Seattle International Film Festival. The filmmakers used archival footage for most of the film.

== Background ==
In 1974, the Boldt decision ruled that American Indian tribes had the right to fish on land ceded to the United States government in treaties made in the 1850s. Prior to this ruling, Native Americans were arrested for fishing on their native lands outside of reservations. To protest this, tribe members conducted civil disobedience demonstrations (fish-ins) in which they continued to fish on their ancestral lands.

== Reception ==
"Fish War is a progress report of sorts, and the news isn’t cheery.", wrote Richard Arlin Walker in Salish Current. Writing for The SunBreak, Josh stated: "Assembling many of the people who fought so heroically, Fish War also contextualizes the implications of their victory in terms of civil rights, environmental stewardship, and building networks of cooperation. An important telling of PNW history, it’s also a refreshing and inspiring reminder that occasionally laws have consequences and words have meaning."

The film was one of the five finalists nominated for the Seattle Film Critics Society PNW Awards but lost to Rainier: A Beer Odyssey.

== See also ==
- Indigenous land rights
- Indigenous peoples of the Pacific Northwest Coast
- United States v. Washington
