= S2S =

In mathematics, S2S is the monadic second order theory of the infinite complete binary tree.

S2S may also refer to:

- Server-to-server, protocol exchange between servers
- Site-to-site VPN
- S2S Pte Ltd, a Japanese record label
- Ski to Sea Race, a race in Whatcom County, Washington
- Sister2Sister, Christine and Sharon Muscat, Maltese-Australian singers
- Sales to Support, type of transfer on Call Center lines, Sales to Technical Support Transfer
- In woodworking or lumber terms S2S= surfaced two sides, while S3S = surfaced three sides and s4s = surfaced four sides
