= Anna Leader =

Luxembourgish English-language poet and novelist

Anna Justine Leader (born 1996) is a Luxembourgish poet and novelist who writes in English. She has won several awards including Luxembourg's national literary contest for young authors (Concours littéraire national, jeunes auteurs de 15-25 ans), first for her novel A Several World in 2014, then for her poetry collection A Lifetime Lies in 2015, and finally for her play Outlast in 2018.

== Biography ==
Born in Bellingham, Washington, on 19 October 1996, Anna Justine Leader is the daughter of American schoolteacher René Leader and the British writer and schoolteacher James Leader. After spending her first four years in the United States, she moved with her family to Luxembourg in 2000. She matriculated from the International School of Luxembourg in 2014, after which she embarked on a comparative literature course at Princeton University. Leader graduated in 2018.

Leader has won the Luxembourgish Concours littéraire national three times, in 2014, 2015, and 2018. Aged 16, she completed her first novel; Tentative tells the story of a teenage triad in Paris. In 2014, her first historical novel won the Luxembourg literary contest in the under-25 category. A Several World is based on a period when Trotsky, Freud, Klimt and the young Anna Freud were all living close to each other in Vienna at the time of World War I. Leader completed the manuscript of 140,000 words in just three months while taking her international baccalaureate examinations. In 2015, Leader won first place again for a collection of poems titled "A Lifetime Lies," and in 2018 the prize was awarded to her play Outlast, a queer environmental take on Luxembourg's founding myth.

When interviewed by Amanda Blanco at Princeton in March 2016, Leader said that she has been influenced by her literary father, publishing her first poem when she was five. She hopes to have a career in education, following in the footsteps of her parents and grandparents. Leader graduated from Princeton University in June 2018 and now works in education.

== Awards ==
In addition to her three national Luxembourg awards, Leader won first prize at the 'Concours Jeune Printemps' in 2012 with her poem "Elegy for Two" and second prize in 2014 with "The Museum". In 2013 and 2015, she was awarded joint first prize in the Guardian Stephen Spender Prize for literary translation (u-18), first with "The Approaching Winter" from Jules Laforgue's "L'hiver qui vient," and then with "Weeds", from German poet Jan Wagner's "Giersch". In 2016, Leader won first prize in the Princeton University Creative Reactions Contest with an untitled poem inspired by the Arcanto String Quartet's concert of 12 November 2015. She also won the 2017 Creative Reactions Contest with a poem titled "love songs between balconies" inspired by the mezzo-soprano Jamie Berton on 6 October 2016.
