= Northwest Film School =

Coordinates: 48°44′51″N 122°28′45″W

- Type: Private
- Established: September 30, 2004
- President: Glen Berry
- Academic staff: 4
- Undergraduates: 23
- Location: 1155 N. State Street Bellingham, WA 98225, Bellingham, WA, USA
- Nickname: NWFS

The Northwest Film School, in Bellingham, Washington, US, is a private, non-profit educational institution specializing in digital media production. The Northwest Film School operates in a partnership with Western Washington University to offer a one-year certificate in Video Production.

== History ==
The Northwest Film School (NWFS) was founded September 30, 2004 by Glen Berry. Its first class had one instructor and eight students.

In 2005, class offerings expanded to three courses and 32 students. The school grew into a larger, (1,000 square foot) space and the course offerings were structured into a two-year, sequential program.

NWFS began professional partnerships and internships with industry professionals in 2006.

In September 2007, Northwest Film School entered into a partnership with Western Washington to offer a one-year certificate program in Video Production. Glen Berry, director of Northwest Film School, also serves as director of the video production program. All curriculum, course materials and faculty are contributed by NWFS, WWU provides marketing and classroom space. All classes at NWFS are now taught at Western Washington University.

In August 2008, the first students of the certificate program complete the program and screen their thesis projects for the public.
