= AeTopus =

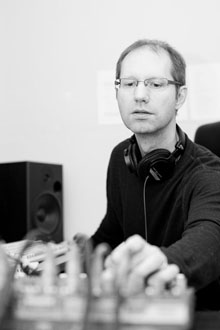
- Bryan Tewell Hughes of AeTopus

Background information
- Born: May 19, 1966 (age 60)
- Origin: Bellingham, Washington
- Genres: Electronic, new-age, dark ambient
- Years active: 2002–present
- Label: 12Ton Productions
- Website: www.aetopus.com

AeTopus is a progressive Electronic music project performed and produced by composer Bryan Tewell Hughes. The music has received critical acclaim within the new-age and electronic music genres, and the album Between Empires won the award of Best Electronic album in the 2012 Zone Music Reporter Awards. The album Tempula was nominated in the Best Electronic category in the 2006 NAR Lifestyle Music Awards. Other nominations for ZMR Best Electronic album include the 2013 Extended play (EP) release Angels and Machines, the 2015 CD When, and the 2018 CD Totem Totum. After having independently released seven albums and two EPs between 2002 and 2022, Hughes signed with the Spotted Peccary Music label for the release of the full-length album Cup in 2023.

== Biography ==
Bryan Tewell Hughes (May 19, 1966) was born in Quantico, Virginia. He began taking piano lessons at age 6, and took up playing bass guitar at age 17. He claims to have been introduced to Electronic and New Age music by his grandparents in the early 1980s, and cites Ray Lynch and Kitaro (notable pioneers in the genre) as two of his early influences.

Between 1987 and 1997, he played bass guitar in local Blues, Reggae, Funk, and Punk bands in Moscow, Idaho (where he earned a B.F.A. in Fine Arts/Painting at University of Idaho in 1989), Portland, Oregon, and his current home of Bellingham, Washington. After releasing a solo industrial CD, AnthroPile: Take (1999), he began an audio engineering internship at Binary Recording Studio in Bellingham.

Hughes has dedicated his musical energy to AeTopus since the release of the full-length CD Memories of the Elder in 2002. He is also a visual artist, and is credited with the art and graphic design of most of his CD liner notes.

In 2025, he released the album iota.

== Musical style ==
AeTopus' sound combines both synthesized and recorded elements, and often features sound bites or spoken human vocalizations that are used to solidify each album's theme. The music is reminiscent of early Electronic New Age in that it contains many common synthesizer sounds (such as arpeggio beeps and bass pads), yet has an exotic presence due to the use of orchestral and ethnic instruments (such as violins, pipe organs, and African percussion).

The music of AeTopus has generally been described as a blend of several Electronic music subgenres. Jim Brenholts of Ambient Visions referred to Memories of the Elder as a "hybrid", describing it as possessing "...elements of the Berlin school, pastoral new age, dark ambience and droning minimalism. At the same time, it is none of those styles. In a 2008 review of Tempula, Bill Binkelman of Zone Music Reporter noted that "...Hughes has fashioned a type of music that belongs to no country and yet also [sic] all countries."

Beginning with the 2020 EP Deep Variants, the AeTopus sound departed from its new-age and pastoral roots, taking on a more experimental, urban feel. The evolution included elements of intelligent dance music and glitch, while still including sweeping ambient passages, location audio, and an emphasis on thematic development.

== Discography ==
- 2002 - Memories of the Elder
- 2006 - Tempula
- 2012 - Between Empires
- 2013 - Angels and Machines (EP)
- 2015 - When
- 2018 - Totem Totum
- 2020 - Deep Variants (EP)
- 2020 - VARIANT
- 2022 - Urbus
- 2023 - Cup
- 2025 - iota
