= Cascadia Daily News =

Newspaper in Bellingham, Washington

- Type: Weekly newspaper
- Owner: David Syre
- Publisher: Cynthia Pope
- Managing editor: Rhonda Prast
- General manager: Staci Baird
- Founded: 2022
- Language: English
- Headquarters: Bellingham, Washington
- Website: cascadiadaily.com

Cascadia Daily News is a digital daily and print weekly newspaper published in Bellingham, Washington, United States. It was founded on January 24, 2022, as the successor to the Cascadia Weekly, and features daily news stories on its website. The newspaper is independent and locally owned, competing with the Bellingham Herald. It is a newspaper of record for Whatcom County. The paper employs 16 in its newsroom, and has yet to become profitable as of 2026.

== History ==
In 1997, Tim Johnson co-founded The Every Other Weekly, an alternative newspaper based in Bellingham, Washington. Its final issue was published on Nov. 27, 2002. Following the closure, Johnson entered into partnership with Douglas Tolchin to launch The Bellingham Weekly on April 24, 2003.

The two co-owned the paper's publisher, Atomic Telegraph, LLC, and constantly feuded as the business faced financial difficulties and failed to pay federal taxes. Tolchin fired Johnson on Dec. 13, 2005, alleging he was scheming to force the company into dissolution and liquidation as a means to become its sole owner. Tolchin laid off the entire staff and scrapped the paper's last issue. Johnson took him to court and was granted a temporary restraining order against Tolchin so he could print the paper's last edition. However, the judge required Johnson to post a $22,000 bond, which he declined.

Tolchin published a four-page issue on Jan. 6, 2006, announcing The Bellingham Weekly was going into "hibernation." This led Johnson to start a third altweekly on March 15, 2006, called the Cascadia Weekly. The paper garnered controversy in 2019 when in it was caught stealing movie reviews. The paper took articles and republished them without permission or compensating the authors. Johnson issued an apology and the practice stopped.

By 2020, businessman David Syre was the sole owner of the Cascadia Newspaper Company, which published the Cascadia Weekly. Syre commissioned a study to uncover ways to revive the paper amid the COVID-19 recession. One option was to shift coverage from arts and culture to hard news. So he hired former Seattle Times columnist Ron Judd to lead the paper, which was rebranded as Cascadia Daily News. The paper's website launched on Jan. 24, 2022, followed by its first print edition on March 2. Six months later after launching the paper added a paywall to its website.

In May 2026, the News launched a quarterly magazine called Cascadia Daily Life. Later that month Syre fired Judd, who led the newsroom as executive editor since launch. The termination largely stemmed from disagreements over the magazine.
