= KMRE =

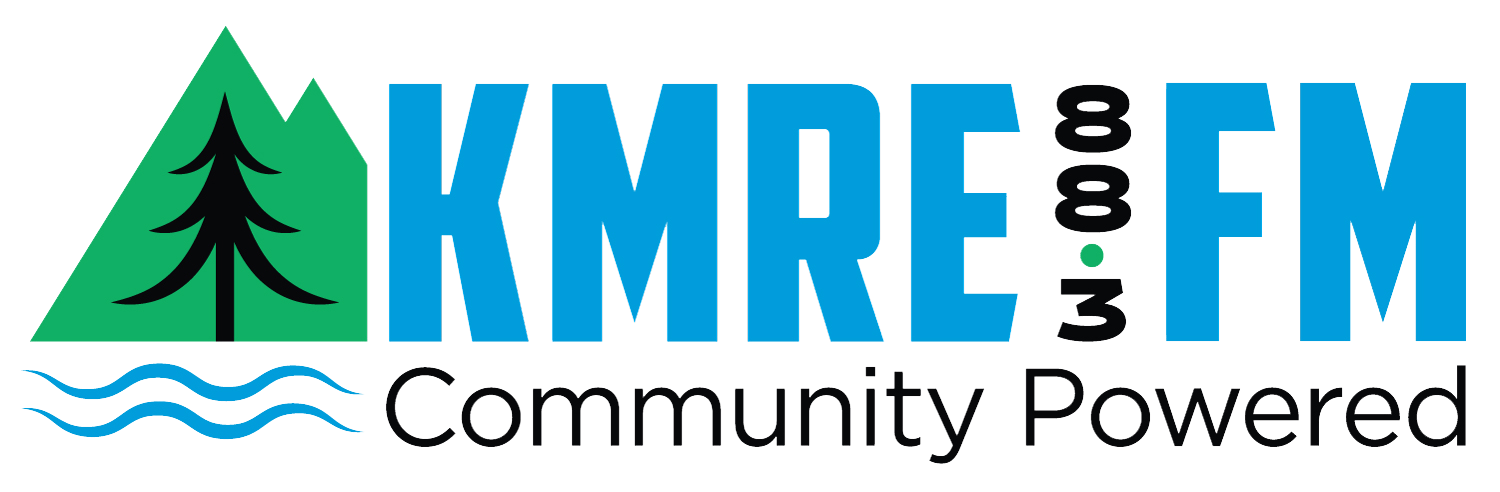
- Bellingham, Washington; United States
- Frequency: 88.3 MHz

Programming
- Format: Community radio
- Affiliations: Pacifica Radio Network

Ownership
- Owner: Kulshan Community Media

History
- First air date: March 1, 2005
- Former call signs: KMRE-LP
- Former frequencies: 102.3 MHz (2005–2023)
- Call sign meaning: (American) Museum of Radio and Electricity, founding owner

Technical information
- Licensing authority: FCC
- Facility ID: 762145
- Class: A
- ERP: 120 watts
- HAAT: 101 meters (331 ft)
- Transmitter coordinates: 48°48′3″N 122°27′45″W

Links
- Public license information: Public file; LMS
- Webcast: Listen live
- Website: kmre.org

KMRE (88.3 FM) is a radio station in Bellingham, Washington, United States. The station broadcasts local and regional news, information, educational, cultural and historic programming from its studio at Whatcom Community College and a transmitter on King Mountain.

KMRE began broadcasting on March 1, 2005, as a low-power FM station at 102.3 MHz. It was founded by the Museum of Radio and Electricity, now the SPARK Museum of Electrical Invention, and initially focused on reairing programming from the Golden Age of Radio and music from the 1920s to the 1940s before broadening its focus. In 2018, when the museum opted to discontinue station operations, Kulshan Community Media was formed to run KMRE. The station began airing Americana music and a daily newscast. Kulshan filed in 2019 to build a higher-power, full-service station on 88.3 MHz. The new facility came into use in 2023.

== History ==
In July 2004, the American Museum of Radio and Electricity (AMRE) received a construction permit from the Federal Communications Commission (FCC) to build a new low-power FM radio station in Bellingham. At the time, museum officials stated their goal for the station was to serve as an "exhibit which extends out beyond the [museum's] four walls", airing programming from the Golden Age of Radio and locally produced programming. 24-hour-a-day broadcasting from KMRE-LP began on March 1, 2005. Its music programming largely consisted of songs from the 1920s to 1940s, many of which were digitized by the museum.

In 2011, museum president John Jenkins announced he would no longer provide personal support as he had since the station started; in later years, he had sold pieces of the museum collection and donating to balance its finances. This required more underwriters to keep KMRE on the air. The museum was renamed in 2011 as the Spark Museum of Electrical Invention.

In the mid-2010s, the station broadened its focus to include more current music programming as well as local news and talk shows. In 2016, the KMRE-LP transmitter was moved to atop the Bellingham Herald Building, having previously been on the Faithlife building at Bay and Prospect streets.

In 2018, Kulshan Community Media was formed when the museum opted to cut ties with the station. That year, the station moved into the basement of the Bellingham National Bank Building, whose owner donated studio space. A new format of Americana music and talk programming accompanied the relaunch under Kulshan.

In 2023, KMRE moved from its low-power facility to a new, higher-power license at 88.3 MHz. Ahead of launching the new full-power license, the station partnered with Whatcom Community College to relocate its studios to the campus.

== See also ==
- List of community radio stations in the United States
