= Lake Padden =

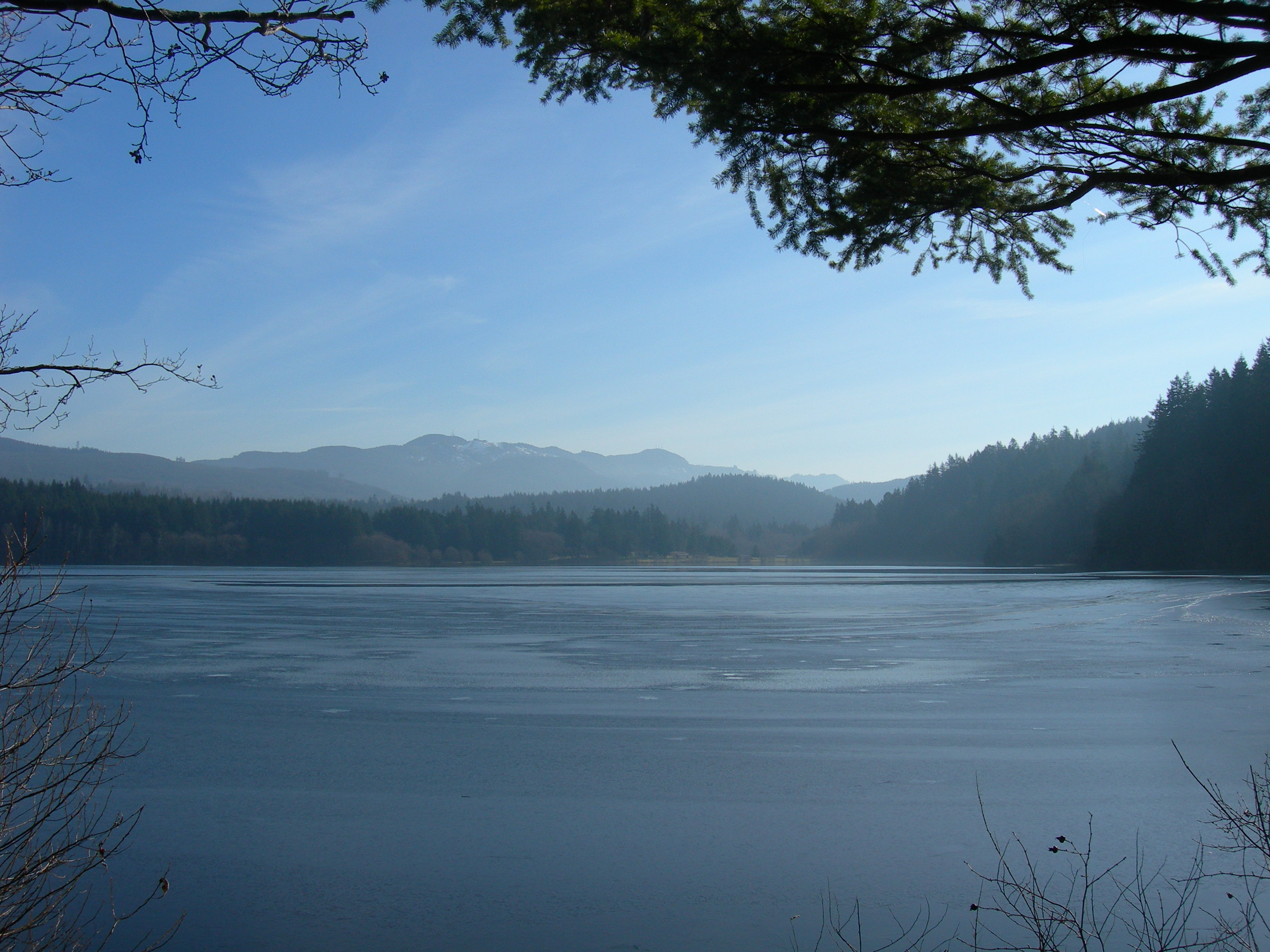
- Lake Padden

- Location within Washington (state) Location within the United States
- Location: Bellingham, Whatcom County, Washington
- Coordinates: 48°42′17″N 122°27′47″W
- Type: reservoir, natural lake
- Primary outflows: Padden Creek
- Catchment area: 2.63 sq mi (6.8 km^{2})
- Basin countries: United States
- Surface area: 160 acres (65 ha)
- Average depth: 27 ft (8.2 m)
- Max. depth: 59 ft (18 m)
- Water volume: 4,300 acre⋅ft (5,300,000 m^{3})
- Shore length^{1}: 2.3 sq mi (6.0 km^{2})
- Surface elevation: 447 ft (136 m)
- ^{1} Shore length is not a well-defined measure.

Lake Padden is a lake located in Bellingham, Washington, United States. It was named for a homesteader and coal miner in the area, Michael Padden, who purchased the land around the lake in 1873. The park is popular during the spring and summer, and features numerous picnic areas as well as playgrounds. There are also numerous trails located around the lake and throughout the surrounding forest that are used for hiking and biking. A public golf course is located along the eastern shore. A significant piece of geography besides the lake itself is a 1,000-foot (300 m) ridge that separates the lake from Interstate 5 to the south.

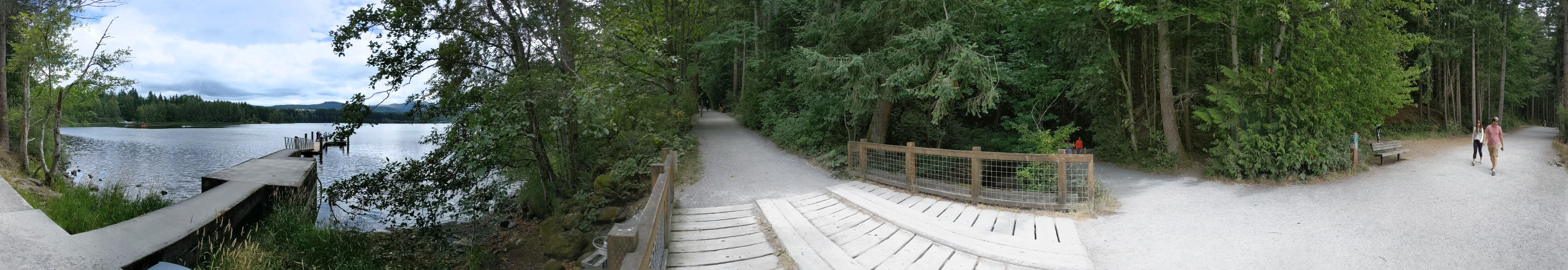
Lake Padden at Padden Creek outflow and Lake Padden Park hiking trails junction.
