= Bellingham, Washington =

City in Washington, United States

- City
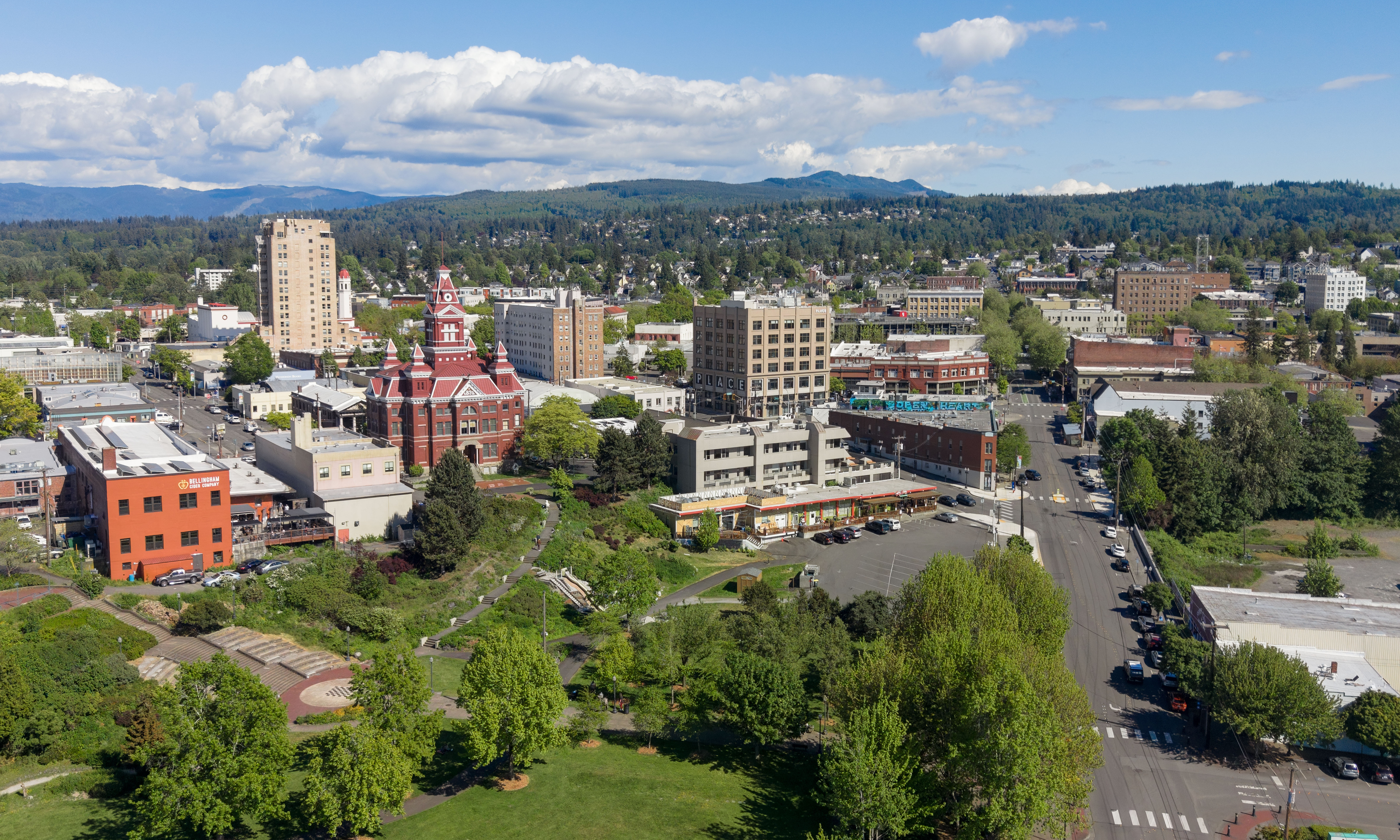
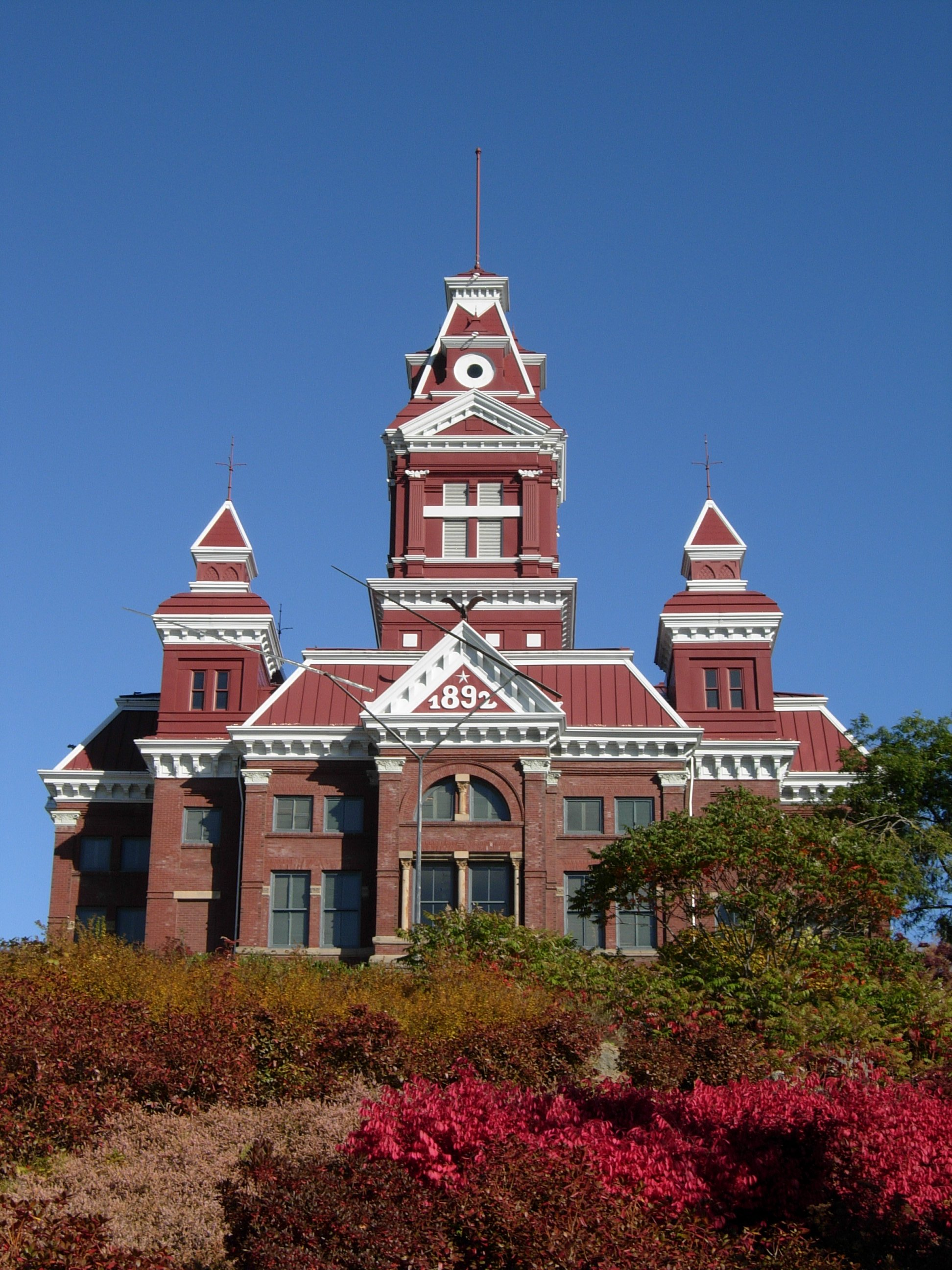
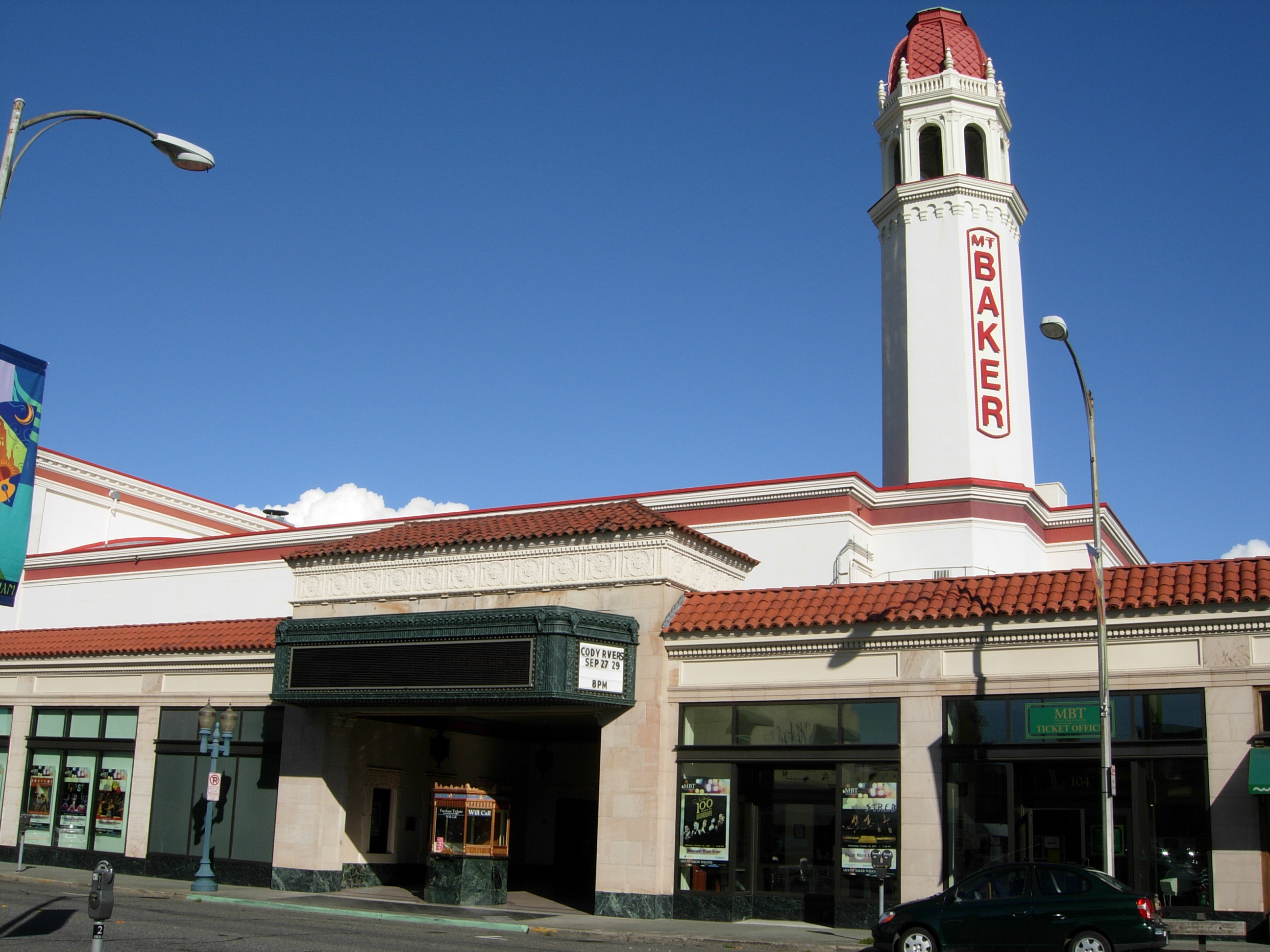
- Downtown Bellingham Whatcom Museum Mount Baker Theatre

- Flag Seal
- Nickname: City of Subdued Excitement
- Location in Whatcom County and the state of Washington

- Location in the United States
- Coordinates: 48°45′N 122°29′W
- Country: United States
- State: Washington
- County: Whatcom
- Incorporated: December 28, 1903
- Named for: Sir William Bellingham, 1st Baronet

Government
  - Type: Mayor–council
  - Mayor: Kim Lund

Area
  - City: 30.511 sq mi (79.023 km^{2})
  - Land: 28.198 sq mi (73.033 km^{2})
  - Water: 2.313 sq mi (5.991 km^{2})
- Elevation: 66 ft (20 m)

Population (2020)
  - City: 91,482
  - Estimate (2026): 99,030
  - Rank: US: 360th WA: 12th
  - Density: 3,330/sq mi (1,286/km^{2})
  - Urban: 128,979 (US: 259th)
  - Urban density: 2,573/sq mi (993.4/km^{2})
  - Metro: 234,954 (US: 204th)
  - Metro density: 109.4/sq mi (42.25/km^{2})
- Demonym: Bellinghamster

GDP
  - Bellingham (MSA): $19.6 billion (2022)
- Time zone: UTC–8 (Pacific (PST))
  - Summer (DST): UTC–7 (PDT)
- ZIP Codes: 98225, 98226, 98227, 98228, 98229
- Area codes: 360, 564
- FIPS code: 53-05280
- GNIS feature ID: 2409823
- Website: cob.org

Bellingham (/ˈbɛlɪŋhæm/ BEL-ing-ham) is a city in and the county seat of Whatcom County in the U.S. state of Washington. It lies 21 miles (34 km) south of the Canada–United States border, between Vancouver, British Columbia, 52 miles (84 km) to the northwest and Seattle 90 miles (140 km) to the south.

The population was 91,482 at the 2020 census, and estimated to be 99,030 in 2026. It is the site of Western Washington University, Bellingham International Airport, and the southern terminus of the Alaska Marine Highway. Bellingham is the northernmost city with a population of more than 90,000 people in the contiguous United States.

The area around Bellingham Bay, named in 1792 by George Vancouver, is the ancestral home of several Coast Salish groups. European settlement in modern-day Bellingham began in the 1850s and several coal mining towns grew in later years. The city of Bellingham was incorporated in 1903 through the consolidation of several settlements, among them Fairhaven. Local industries shifted away from coal in the mid-20th century; the industrial areas on the Bellingham waterfront have undergone redevelopment into a mixed-use neighborhood since the 2000s.

== History ==
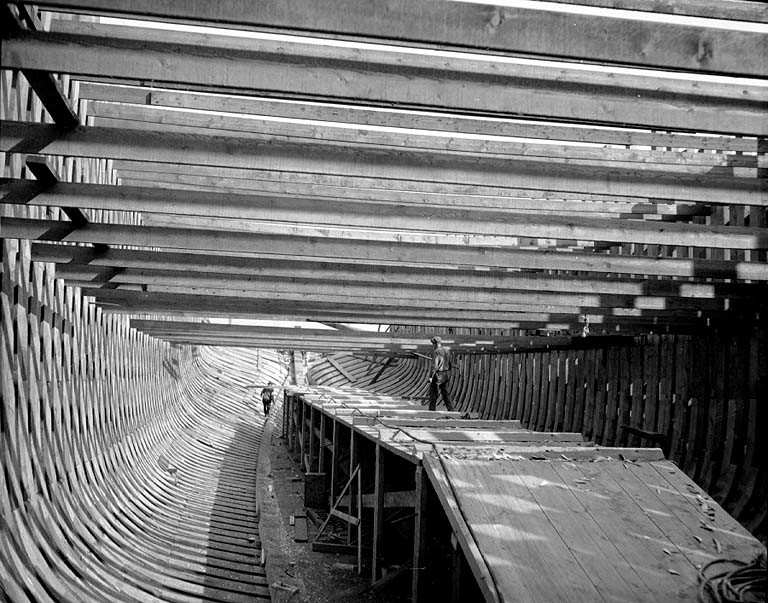
Boatbuilding at Pacific American Fisheries yard in Bellingham, 1916

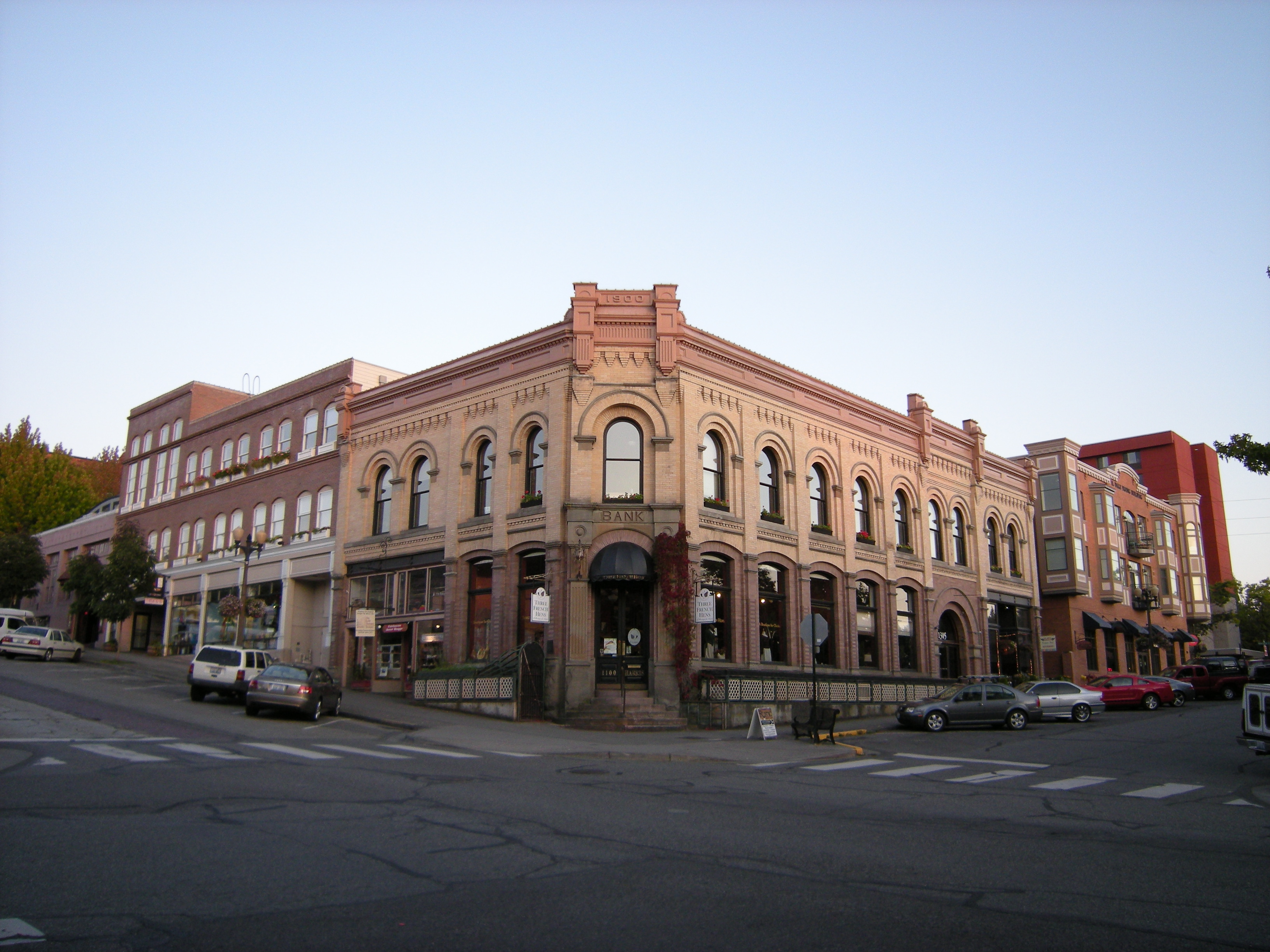
An old bank building, built in 1900 in the Fairhaven Historic District

Bellingham has been inhabited by Indigenous peoples for millennia. The city of Bellingham and its surrounding area is the intersection of the territories of many Coast Salishan peoples. The Lummi, Nooksack, Samish, and Nuwhaha in particular fished in Bellingham Bay and shared the hunting and gathering grounds in the nearby forests and prairies. Indigenous people continue to live in and around Bellingham, particularly the Lummi, who have a reservation directly west of the city.

The modern city of Bellingham, incorporated in 1903, consolidated four settlements: Bellingham, Whatcom, Fairhaven, and Sehome. It takes its name from Bellingham Bay, which George Vancouver named in 1792 for Sir William Bellingham.

The first European immigrants reached the area about 1852 when Henry Roeder and Russel Peabody set up a lumber mill at Whatcom, now the northern part of Bellingham. Lumber cutting and milling continues to the present in Whatcom county. At about the same time, Dan Harris arrived, claiming a homestead along Padden Creek, and after acquiring surrounding properties, platted the town of Fairhaven in 1883. In 1858, the Fraser Canyon Gold Rush caused a short lived population growth that established the community.

After the 1855 Treaty of Point Elliott, the Lummi Reservation was formed near Bellingham, and many Lummi moved to the reservation while working in Bellingham and the surrounding area. In the 1800s, Lummi workers ran river ferries and worked in the town industries of construction and logging. The Nooksack were also pressured to move to the Lummi Reservation but resisted several U.S. relocation attempts in the 1870s and remained in the Nooksack Valley.

Coal was mined in the Bellingham Bay area from the mid-19th to the mid-20th centuries starting when Henry Roeder's agents discovered coal south of Whatcom Creek, in an area called Sehome, now downtown Bellingham, in 1854. They sold the coal-bearing land to San Francisco investors who established the Bellingham Bay Coal Company, eventually a subsidiary of the Black Diamond Coal Mining Company. After a hundred years of extensive mining beneath present-day Bellingham, the last mine closed in 1955.

In the early 1890s, three railroad lines arrived, connecting the bay cities to a nationwide market of builders. In 1889, Pierre Cornwall and an association of investors formed the Bellingham Bay Improvement Company (BBIC). The BBIC invested in several diverse enterprises such as shipping, coal, mining, railroad construction, real estate sales and utilities. Even though their dreams of turning the cities by the bay into a Pacific Northwest metropolis never came to fruition, the BBIC made an immense contribution to the economic development of Bellingham.

BBIC was not the only outside firm with an interest in the bay area utilities. The General Electric Company of New York purchased the Fairhaven Line and New Whatcom street rail line in 1897. In 1898, the utility merged into the Northern Railway and Improvement Company which prompted the Electric Corporation of Boston to purchase a large block of shares.

In 1890, Fairhaven developers bought the tiny community of Bellingham. Whatcom and Sehome merged in 1891 to form New Whatcom (1903 act of the State legislature dropped "New" from the name.) At first, attempts to combine Fairhaven and Whatcom failed, and there was controversy over the name of the proposed new city. Whatcom citizens would not support a city named Fairhaven, and Fairhaven residents would not support a city named Whatcom. They eventually settled on the name Bellingham, which remains today. Voting a second time for a final merger of Fairhaven and Whatcom into a single city, the resolution passed with 2163 votes for and 596 against.

Bellingham was officially incorporated on December 28, 1903, as a result of the incremental consolidation of the four towns initially situated on the east of Bellingham Bay during the final decade of the 19th Century. Whatcom is today's "Old Town" area and was founded with Roeder's Mill in 1852. Sehome was an area of downtown founded with the Sehome Coal Mine in 1854. Bellingham was further south near Boulevard Park, founded in 1883 and purchased in 1890 by Fairhaven. Fairhaven was a large commercial district with its own harbor, founded in 1883, by Dan Harris, around his initial homestead on Padden Creek.

Bellingham was the site of the Bellingham riots against East Indian (Sikh) immigrant workers in 1907. A mob of 400–500 white men, predominantly members of the Asiatic Exclusion League, with intentions to exclude East Indian immigrants from the work force of the local lumber mills, attacked the homes of the South Asian Indians. The Indians were mostly Sikhs but were labeled as Hindus by much of the media of the day.

Bellingham's proximity to the Strait of Juan de Fuca and to the Inside Passage to Alaska helped to retain some cannery operations. Pacific American Fisheries (P.A.F.), for example, shipped empty cans to Alaska, where they were packed with fish and shipped back.

In 1911, President William Howard Taft visited Bellingham during a western tour, attending a breakfast at the Chamber of Commerce building on October 9 before delivering public remarks in the city.

In 1933, the New Whatcom Normal School, a teacher's training college in Bellingham, was accredited by the state so that it could give bachelor's degrees in education. After World War II, returning soldiers used the GI Bill to attend schools like this one, and it expanded in size and curriculum. By 1961, it was renamed Western Washington State College, and it became a university in 1977.

The Bellingham International Airport was built in 1941 but was not available for public use until after World War II ended. In the 1950s, many of the industries that had sustained Bellingham were on the decline, and by the 1970s, the Fairhaven neighborhood had many neglected historic buildings. In that decade, they were redeveloped by preservationists and people in the tourism industry to keep their historic facades while serving new purposes.

In the 1970s, Western Washington University hosted some of Bellingham's first Pride events, and the local YWCA partnered with other organizations to provide services to the lesbian community. Bellingham's first city Pride began in 1999.

Also in 1999, the Olympic Gas Pipeline exploded, flooding Whatcom Creek with gasoline and killing three people. The creek and area were restored over the following years, and Washington State passed the 2000 Washington Pipeline Safety Act in response.

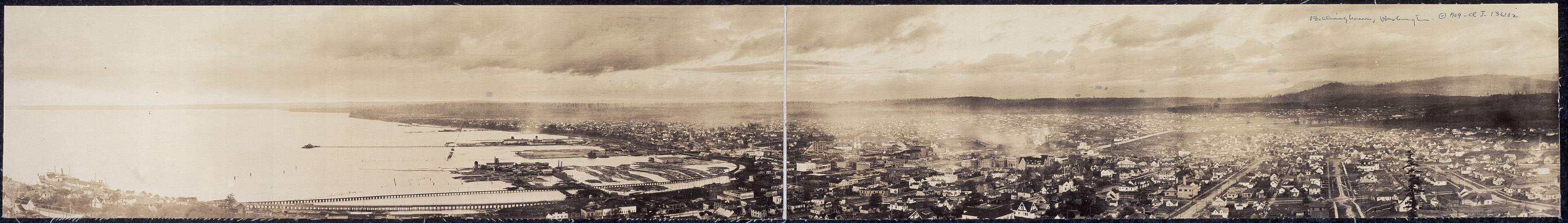
Bellingham c. 1909
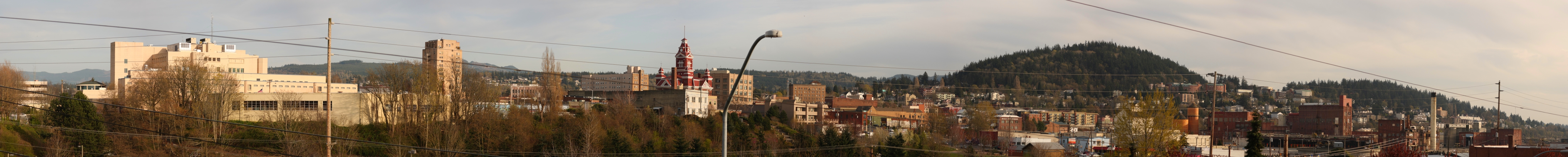
Bellingham, 2010

== Geography ==
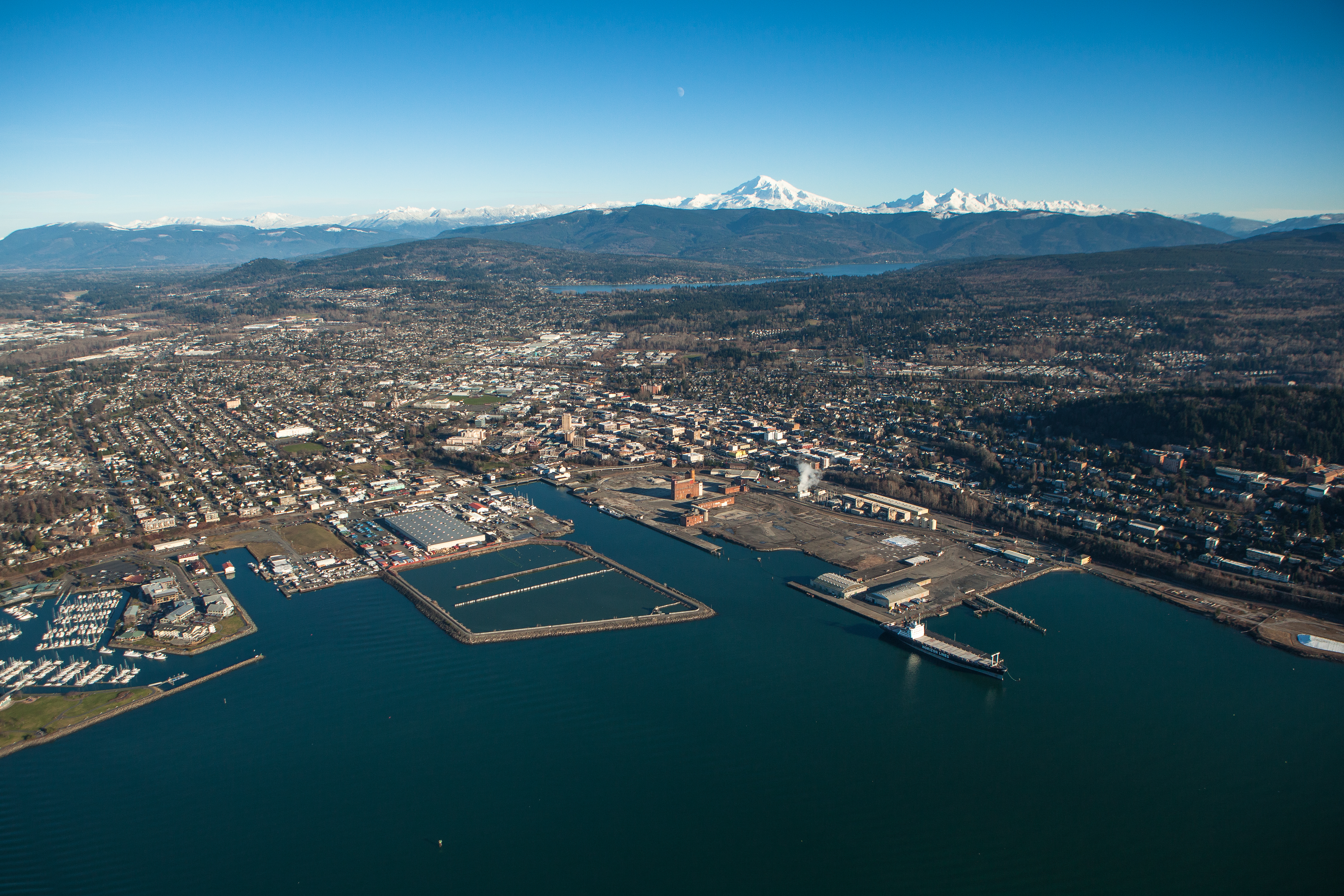
Aerial view of Bellingham

The city is situated on Bellingham Bay which is protected by Lummi Island, Portage Island, and the Lummi Peninsula, and opens onto the Strait of Georgia. It lies west of Mount Baker and Lake Whatcom (from which it gets its drinking water) and north of the Chuckanut Mountains and the Skagit Valley. Whatcom Creek runs through the center of the city. Bellingham is 18 miles (29 km) south of the US-Canada border and 50 miles (80 km) southeast of Vancouver.

According to the United States Census Bureau, the city has a total area of 30.511 square miles (79.02 km^{2}), of which, 28.198 square miles (73.03 km^{2}) is land and 2.313 square miles (5.99 km^{2}) is water. The lowest elevations are at sea level along the waterfront. Alabama Hill is one of the higher points in the city at about 500 feet (150 m). Elevations of 800 feet (240 m) are found near Yew Street Hill north of Lake Padden and near Galbraith Mountain. South and eastward of the city limits are taller foothills of the North Cascades mountains. Mount Baker is the largest peak in the local area, with a summit elevation of 10,778 feet (3,285 m) that is only 31 miles (50 km) from Bellingham Bay. Mount Baker is visible from many parts of the city and western Whatcom County. Lake Whatcom forms part of the eastern boundary of the city, while many smaller lakes and wetland areas are found around the region.

Situated at a latitude of 48.75 North, and thus north of the 48°34' parallel, Bellingham is one of only a few cities in the continental United States that experience astronomical twilight for the entire night. The phenomenon occurs every year between June 14 and 28.

Bellingham's neighborhoods are Alabama Hill, Barkley, Birchwood, Columbia, Cordata, Cornwall Park, Downtown Central Business District, Edgemoor, Fairhaven, Happy Valley, Irongate, King Mountain, Lettered Streets, Meridian, Puget, Roosevelt, Samish, Sehome, Silver Beach, South Hill, Sunnyland, Whatcom Falls, Western Washington University (WWU) (including the campus), and York.

=== Climate ===
Bellingham, Washington

Climate chart (precipitation, max. and min. temperature)
| J | F | M | A | M | J | J | A | S | O | N | D |
| 4.5 46 34 | 2.9 49 35 | 3.4 53 38 | 2.8 58 42 | 2.2 64 47 | 1.6 68 52 | 0.9 73 55 | 1.1 73 55 | 2 68 50 | 3.9 59 43 | 5.2 51 38 | 4.3 46 34 |
- █ Average max. and min. temperatures in °F
- █ Precipitation totals in inches
- Source: NOAA
Metric conversion
| J | F | M | A | M | J | J | A | S | O | N | D |
| 114 8 1 | 72 9 1 | 85 12 3 | 70 14 5 | 57 18 8 | 41 20 11 | 22 23 13 | 29 23 13 | 51 20 10 | 98 15 6 | 132 11 3 | 110 8 1 |
- █ Average max. and min. temperatures in °C
- █ Precipitation totals in mm

Bellingham's climate is generally mild and typical of the Puget Sound region; classified as warm-summer Mediterranean (Köppen: Csb) or oceanic (Trewartha: Do). The city is strongly influenced by the Cascade Range and Olympic Mountains. The Cascades to the east block continental influence, while the Olympics provide a rain shadow effect that buffers Bellingham from much of the rainfall approaching from the southwest.

Bellingham receives an average annual rainfall of 34.84 inches (885 mm), which is slightly less than nearby Seattle. November is typically the wettest month, with numerous frontal rainstorms. Still, precipitation is distributed throughout the rainy period extending from October through April.

Bellingham has the lowest average sunshine amount of any city in the US. Despite this, Bellingham has fewer overcast days on average than Seattle (SeaTac), Everett (Paine Field) and Olympia. The hottest summer days rarely exceed 90 °F (32 °C) and the warmest temperature on record is 100 °F (38 °C) on August 12, 2021. This is markedly cooler than the record high for Seattle (108 °F (42 °C)) and most other Washington locations. Drought is rare, although some summers are noticeably drier than others and some normally reliable wells have been known to run dry in August and September. Nevertheless, crops are more frequently ruined by too much rain rather than too little.

Bellingham's proximity to the Fraser River valley occasionally subjects it to a harsh winter weather pattern (termed a 'north-Easter') wherein an upper-level trough drives cold Arctic air from the Canadian interior southwesterly through the Fraser River Canyon. Such an event was recorded on November 28, 2006, when air temperatures of 12 °F (−11 °C) were accompanied by 30 to 48 miles per hour (48 to 77 km/h) winds. Wind chill values reached −10 °F (−23 °C) according to NOAA. Several days into this pattern, local ponds and smaller lakes freeze solidly enough to allow skating. These outflow winds also can collide with Gulf of Alaska moisture and create ice, snow, or heavy rains; the freezing rain can create a phenomenon referred to as a "silver thaw" that produces hazardous roads among other inconveniences.

Its reverse, the "Pineapple Express", refers to acutely mild autumn and winter spells – for most of such a spell, an unusually warm and steady wind comes out of the south. It will typically follow several days of Arctic northeast outflow winds, and it can melt significant snow accumulations quickly, pushing drainage systems to their limits.

Climate data for Bellingham, Washington (Bellingham International Airport) 1991–2020, (Note: Mean monthly maxima and minima (i.e. the highest and lowest temperature readings during an entire month or year) calculated based on data at said location from 1991 to 2020.) extremes 1949–present
| Month | Jan | Feb | Mar | Apr | May | Jun | Jul | Aug | Sep | Oct | Nov | Dec | Year |
|---|---|---|---|---|---|---|---|---|---|---|---|---|---|
| Record high °F (°C) | 65 (18) | 72 (22) | 76 (24) | 83 (28) | 90 (32) | 99 (37) | 96 (36) | 100 (38) | 89 (32) | 80 (27) | 73 (23) | 67 (19) | 100 (38) |
| Mean maximum °F (°C) | 57.3 (14.1) | 58.3 (14.6) | 64.0 (17.8) | 70.9 (21.6) | 77.2 (25.1) | 80.8 (27.1) | 84.8 (29.3) | 84.3 (29.1) | 79.2 (26.2) | 69.5 (20.8) | 61.4 (16.3) | 56.9 (13.8) | 87.7 (30.9) |
| Mean daily maximum °F (°C) | 46.3 (7.9) | 48.9 (9.4) | 52.8 (11.6) | 57.7 (14.3) | 63.9 (17.7) | 67.8 (19.9) | 72.7 (22.6) | 73.1 (22.8) | 68.1 (20.1) | 58.9 (14.9) | 51.0 (10.6) | 45.5 (7.5) | 58.9 (14.9) |
| Daily mean °F (°C) | 40.2 (4.6) | 41.7 (5.4) | 45.1 (7.3) | 49.6 (9.8) | 55.5 (13.1) | 59.8 (15.4) | 63.9 (17.7) | 63.9 (17.7) | 58.4 (14.7) | 51.1 (10.6) | 44.5 (6.9) | 39.8 (4.3) | 51.2 (10.7) |
| Mean daily minimum °F (°C) | 34.0 (1.1) | 34.5 (1.4) | 37.5 (3.1) | 41.6 (5.3) | 47.0 (8.3) | 51.8 (11.0) | 55.0 (12.8) | 54.7 (12.6) | 49.6 (9.8) | 43.2 (6.2) | 37.9 (3.3) | 34.1 (1.2) | 43.4 (6.3) |
| Mean minimum °F (°C) | 19.7 (−6.8) | 22.9 (−5.1) | 26.9 (−2.8) | 32.1 (0.1) | 36.4 (2.4) | 43.0 (6.1) | 46.8 (8.2) | 45.9 (7.7) | 38.8 (3.8) | 30.8 (−0.7) | 23.8 (−4.6) | 20.6 (−6.3) | 15.7 (−9.1) |
| Record low °F (°C) | −2 (−19) | −2 (−19) | 10 (−12) | 24 (−4) | 25 (−4) | 37 (3) | 40 (4) | 38 (3) | 28 (−2) | 20 (−7) | 3 (−16) | −1 (−18) | −2 (−19) |
| Average precipitation inches (mm) | 4.49 (114) | 2.85 (72) | 3.36 (85) | 2.77 (70) | 2.23 (57) | 1.61 (41) | 0.88 (22) | 1.13 (29) | 2.01 (51) | 3.85 (98) | 5.20 (132) | 4.33 (110) | 34.71 (882) |
| Average snowfall inches (cm) | 3.4 (8.6) | 2.4 (6.1) | 0.7 (1.8) | trace | 0.0 (0.0) | 0.0 (0.0) | 0.0 (0.0) | 0.0 (0.0) | 0.0 (0.0) | 0.1 (0.25) | 0.9 (2.3) | 2.9 (7.4) | 10.4 (26) |
| Average precipitation days (≥ 0.01 in) | 18.9 | 15.8 | 17.9 | 15.5 | 12.3 | 10.2 | 5.7 | 6.2 | 11.0 | 16.1 | 19.6 | 19.3 | 168.5 |
| Average snowy days (≥ 0.1 in) | 1.8 | 1.4 | 0.5 | 0.1 | 0.0 | 0.0 | 0.0 | 0.0 | 0.0 | 0.1 | 0.4 | 1.5 | 5.8 |
| Mean monthly sunshine hours | 62 | 84 | 124 | 180 | 217 | 240 | 279 | 248 | 186 | 124 | 60 | 62 | 1,866 |
Source 1: NOAA (snowfall 1981–2010)
Source 2: Weather-US

== Demographics ==
Historical population
| Census | Pop. | Note | %± |
|---|---|---|---|
| 1890 | 8,135 | | — |
| 1900 | 11,062 | | 36.0% |
| 1910 | 24,298 | | 119.7% |
| 1920 | 25,585 | | 5.3% |
| 1930 | 30,823 | | 20.5% |
| 1940 | 29,314 | | −4.9% |
| 1950 | 34,112 | | 16.4% |
| 1960 | 34,688 | | 1.7% |
| 1970 | 39,375 | | 13.5% |
| 1980 | 45,794 | | 16.3% |
| 1990 | 52,179 | | 13.9% |
| 2000 | 67,171 | | 28.7% |
| 2010 | 80,885 | | 20.4% |
| 2020 | 91,482 | | 13.1% |
| 2024 (est.) | 95,860 | | 4.8% |
U.S. Decennial Census; 2020 Census

=== Racial and ethnic composition ===
Bellingham, Washington – Racial and ethnic composition Note: the US Census treats Hispanic/Latino as an ethnic category. This table excludes Latinos from the racial categories and assigns them to a separate category. Hispanics/Latinos may be of any race.
| Race / Ethnicity (NH = Non-Hispanic) | Pop 2000 | Pop 2010 | Pop 2020 | % 2000 | % 2010 | % 2020 |
|---|---|---|---|---|---|---|
| White alone (NH) | 57,684 | 65,907 | 68,442 | 85.88% | 81.48% | 74.81% |
| Black or African American alone (NH) | 622 | 1,015 | 1,253 | 0.93% | 1.25% | 1.37% |
| Native American or Alaska Native alone (NH) | 899 | 964 | 812 | 1.34% | 1.19% | 0.89% |
| Asian alone (NH) | 2,832 | 4,086 | 5,425 | 4.22% | 5.05% | 5.93% |
| Pacific Islander alone (NH) | 106 | 201 | 280 | 0.16% | 0.25% | 0.31% |
| Other race alone (NH) | 176 | 177 | 537 | 0.26% | 0.22% | 0.59% |
| Mixed Race or Multi-Racial (NH) | 1,741 | 2,870 | 6,257 | 2.59% | 3.55% | 6.84% |
| Hispanic or Latino (any race) | 3,111 | 5,665 | 8,476 | 4.63% | 7.00% | 9.27% |
| Total | 67,171 | 80,885 | 91,482 | 100.00% | 100.00% | 100.00% |

=== 2020 census ===
As of the 2020 census, Bellingham had a population of 91,482; 39,236 households; and 18,252 families residing in the city.

The median age was 33.7 years; 14.9% of residents were under the age of 18 and 17.3% of residents were 65 years of age or older. For every 100 females there were 93.2 males, and for every 100 females age 18 and over there were 91.2 males age 18 and over.

99.8% of residents lived in urban areas, while 0.2% lived in rural areas.

Of those households, 19.8% had children under the age of 18 living in them. Of all households, 33.5% were married-couple households, 23.5% were households with a male householder and no spouse or partner present, and 32.6% were households with a female householder and no spouse or partner present. About 35.0% of all households were made up of individuals and 13.6% had someone living alone who was 65 years of age or older.

There were 41,267 housing units, of which 4.9% were vacant. The homeowner vacancy rate was 0.7% and the rental vacancy rate was 3.4%.

Racial composition as of the 2020 census
| Race | Number | Percent |
|---|---|---|
| White | 70,672 | 77.3% |
| Black or African American | 1,313 | 1.4% |
| American Indian and Alaska Native | 1,083 | 1.2% |
| Asian | 5,516 | 6.0% |
| Native Hawaiian and Other Pacific Islander | 317 | 0.3% |
| Some other race | 3,386 | 3.7% |
| Two or more races | 9,195 | 10.1% |
| Hispanic or Latino (of any race) | 8,476 | 9.3% |

=== 2010 census ===
As of the 2010 census, there were 80,885 people, 34,671 households, and 16,129 families residing in the city. The population density was 2,986.9 inhabitants per square mile (1,153.2/km^{2}). There were 36,760 housing units at an average density of 1,357.5 per square mile (524.1/km^{2}). The racial makeup of the city was 84.9% White, 1.3% African American, 1.3% Native American, 5.1% Asian, 0.3% Pacific Islander, 2.8% from other races, and 4.3% from two or more races. Hispanic or Latino of any race were 7.0% of the population.

There were 34,671 households, of which 21.1% had children under the age of 18 living with them, 34.2% were married couples living together, 8.9% had a female householder with no husband present, 3.5% had a male householder with no wife present, and 53.5% were non-families. 35.3% of all households were made up of individuals, and 10.8% had someone living alone who was 65 years of age or older. The average household size was 2.18 and the average family size was 2.79.

The median age in the city was 31.3 years. 15.6% of residents were under the age of 18; 23.5% were between the ages of 18 and 24; 25.9% were from 25 to 44; 22% were from 45 to 64; and 12.8% were 65 years of age or older. The gender makeup of the city was 48.8% male and 51.2% female.

=== 2000 census ===
As of 2000, the median income for a household in the city was $32,530, and the median income for a family was $47,196. Males had a median income of $35,288 versus $25,971 for females. The per capita income for the city was $19,483. About 9.4% of families and 20.6% of the population were below the poverty line, including 17.2% of those under age 18 and 9.0% of those aged 65 or over.

== Economy ==
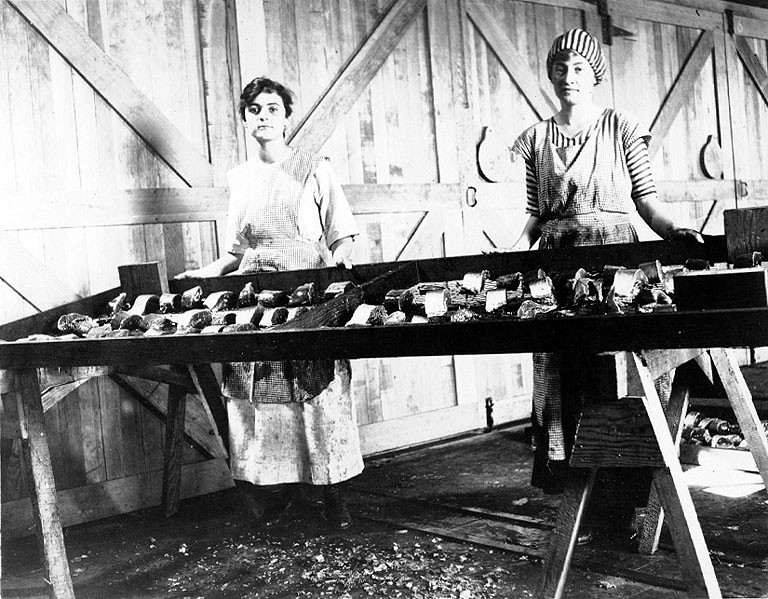
Workers with cut salmon on smoking trays at Whatcom Fish Products in Bellingham, 1916. Photo by John Nathan Cobb.

As of 2024, the mean annual salary of a wage earner in Bellingham is $69,097, which is slightly above the Washington State average of $67,932.

In the first quarter of 2017, Bellingham's median home sale was $382,763, compared to the Whatcom County median of $322,779. Strong job and income growth, along with low inventory of homes for sale, have contributed to a median monthly rental payment in February 2017 of $1,526.

=== Largest employers ===
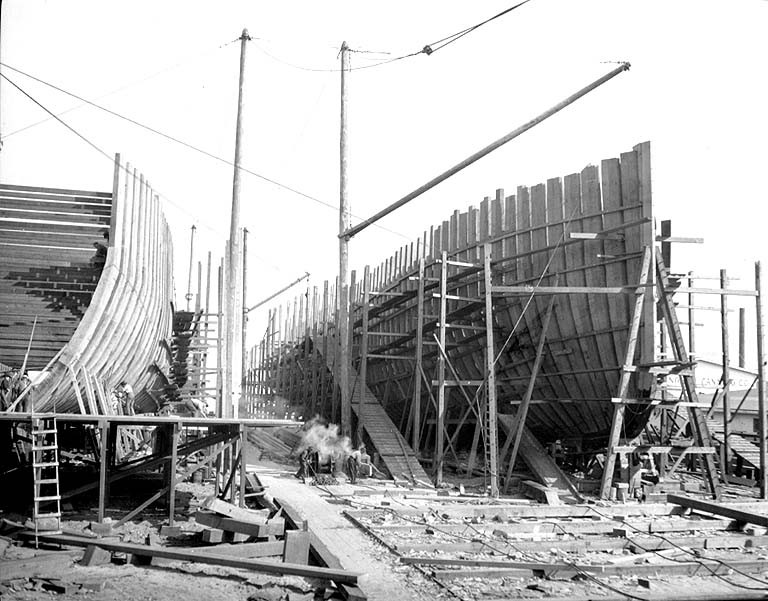
Boats being built at the Pacific American Fisheries yard in Bellingham, September 1916

According to the city's 2021 Comprehensive Annual Financial Report, the largest employers in the city are:

| # | Employer | Type of Business | # of Employees | Percentage |
|---|---|---|---|---|
| 1 | PeaceHealth St. Joseph Medical Center | Health Care | 3,116 | 2.79% |
| 2 | Lummi | Corporation | 2,083 | 1.87% |
| 3 | Western Washington University | University | 2,060 | 1.84% |
| 4 | Bellingham School District No. 501 | Education | 1,423 | 1.27% |
| 5 | BP Cherry Point Refinery | Oil and Gas | 975 | 0.87% |
| 6 | City of Bellingham | Government | 936 | 0.84% |
| 7 | Whatcom County | Government | 918 | 0.82% |
| 8 | Matrix Service | Petroleum | 870 | 0.78% |
| 9 | Ferndale School District No. 502 | Education | 847 | 0.76% |
| 10 | LTI, Inc. | Transport of liquid- and dry-bulk commodities | 557 | 0.50% |
| — | Total employers | — | 13,785 | 12.34% |

== Arts and culture ==
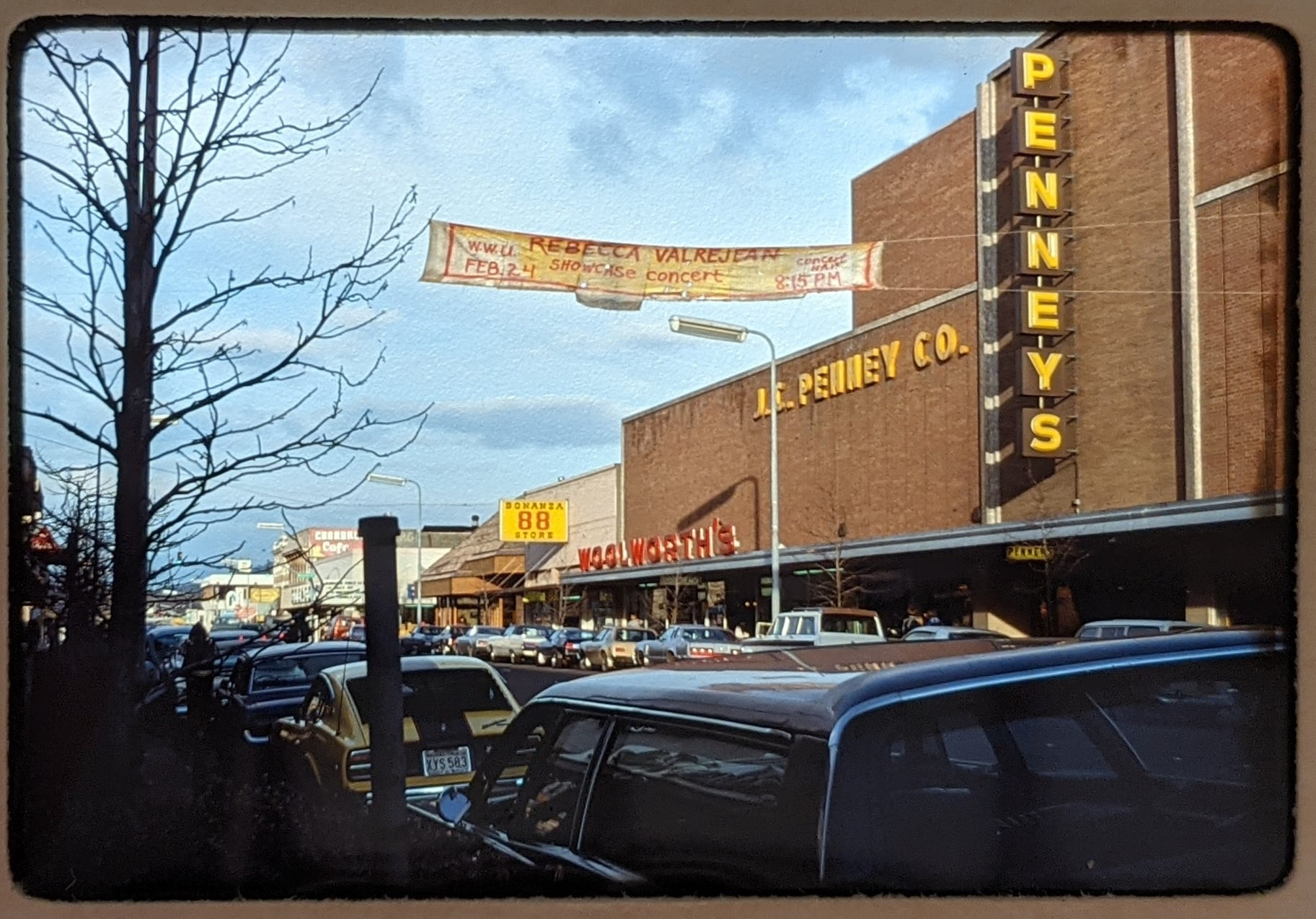
Cornwall Avenue in downtown Bellingham, 1978

=== Events ===
- The Ski to Sea Race is a team relay race made up of seven legs: cross country skiing, downhill skiing (or snowboarding), running, road biking, canoeing (2 person), cyclocross biking, and kayaking. The racers begin at the Mount Baker Ski Area and make their way down to the finish line on Bellingham Bay. Organized by the nonprofit Whatcom Events, the event was first held in 1973 and traces its roots to the 1911 Mt. Baker Marathon.
- The Bellingham Bay Marathon, Half Marathon, 10K & 5K is held annually on the last Sunday in September, attracting approximately 2,500 runners and walkers each year. The Boston-qualifier marathon starts near Gooseberry Point on Lummi Nation and circumnavigates Bellingham Bay to finish in downtown Bellingham. The half marathon, 10K, and 5K races all start and end at Depot Market Square.
- The Whatcom Artist Studio Tour is an annual event featuring local artists working in a variety of media. On the first two weekends in October, artists open their studios up to the public.
- The Bellingham Highland Games & Scottish Festival is held every year at Ferndale's Hovander Park the first full weekend in June. The outdoor event celebrates Scottish culture and heritage, with two days of games, spectator sports, dancing, music and food.
- LinuxFest Northwest is a free conference dedicated to discussion and development of the Linux operating system and other open-source and free-software projects. It is a weekend event held at Bellingham Technical College in late April or early May which draws more than a thousand enthusiasts.
- The annual International Day of Peace is celebrated in Bellingham on September 21. The holiday was instituted by the United Nations as a 24-hour global cease-fire. The Bellingham-based Whatcom Peace & Justice Center publishes a calendar of upcoming activist events with a theme of non-violence, community dissent, and worldwide peace.
- The Bellingham Festival of Music is an annual celebration of orchestral and chamber concerts, held in July, hosting musicians from North American orchestral ensembles.
- Bellingham Pride is a gay pride parade and festival held in July each year to celebrate LGBT people and history. The parade passes through the downtown and ends in the public market area.

=== Beer ===
Craft beer is a major emerging industry in Bellingham. As of 2020, there are at least 15 breweries within Bellingham city limits and three additional breweries in greater Whatcom County. In 2022, these breweries combined won 23 medals at seven national and international brewery competitions.

Most of Bellingham's breweries are located within a couple miles of each other in the downtown core. Some are in very close proximity.

Distilling has also emerged as a component of Bellingham’s craft beverage industry, with locally produced spirits gaining recognition in national and international competitions. A Bellingham-based distillery has been named Washington State Distillery of the Year at the New York International Spirits Competition and has expanded its presence through downtown hospitality venues and a waterfront location at the Portal Container Village.

=== Downtown ===
The Bellingham Farmers Market is open on Saturdays from early April to late December. Originally opened in 1993, the Farmers Market now features more than 50 vendors, music and community events. The association also operates a weekly Wednesday market in nearby Fairhaven.

Wednesday nights in the summer see Downtown Sounds, a family-friendly concert series featuring food booths and a beer garden with local breweries held on Bay Street.

From May to September, the Downtown Bellingham Partnership runs the Commercial Street Night Market, with local food, artisan vendors, live music and performances.

=== Local attractions ===
The Whatcom Museum of History and Art sponsors exhibits of painting, sculpture, local history, and is an active participant in the city's monthly Gallery Walks which are pedestrian tours of the historic buildings of the city, offering history and art lessons for local schools and adult groups, and historic cruises on Bellingham Bay.

The SPARK Museum of Electrical Invention, formerly known as the American Museum of Radio and Electricity, has a collection of rare artifacts from 1580 into the 1950s, providing educational resources about the history of electronics and radio broadcasting. The Spark Museum had founded KMRE FM KMRE-LP 102.3 FM, a low-power FM radio station which broadcast a number of old shows popular many decades ago, as well as programming of general interest to the community. KMRE was housed at the museum in the beginning, but moved to The Bellingham National Bank Building, a few blocks from the museum because they needed more space. The station's license was cancelled on June 20, 2023.

Mindport was a privately funded arts and science museum until its closure in 2024.

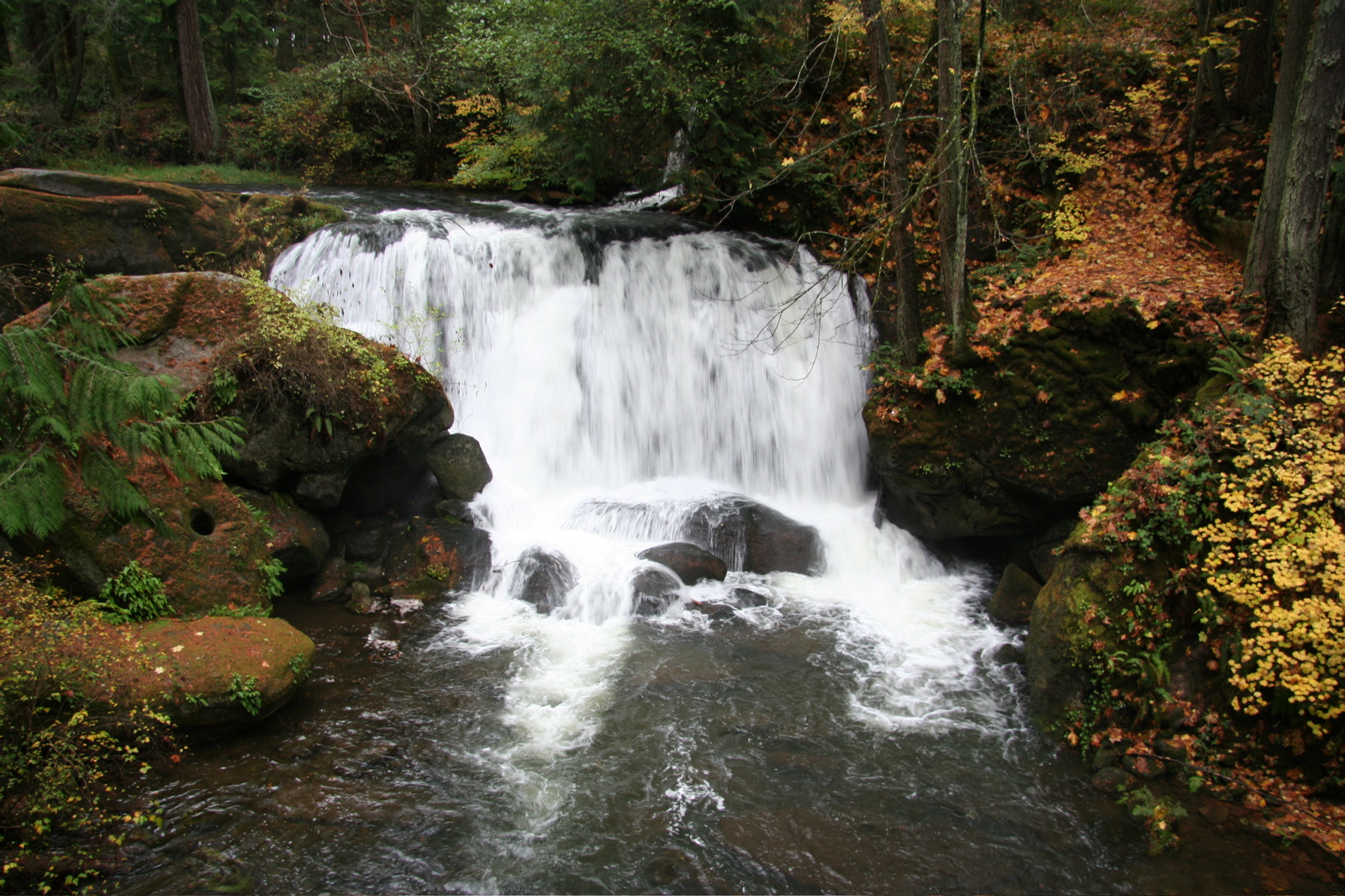
Upper Falls in Whatcom Falls Park

Whatcom Falls Park is a 241-acre (98 ha) public park encompassing the Whatcom Creek gorge, running directly through the heart of the city. It has four sets of waterfalls and several miles of walking trails. Popular activities during warmer weather include swimming, fishing, and strolling along the numerous walking trails. On June 10, 1999, the Olympic pipeline explosion occurred in Whatcom Falls Park, killing three boys who were playing in the vicinity. Operated by Olympic Pipe Line Company, the pipeline that crossed Whatcom and Hanna Creeks leaked gasoline that turned the creeks pink, and then exploded into flames.

To the east of the city lies Lake Whatcom, which provides the local public water supply and is the source of Whatcom Creek.

Bellis Fair Mall, the city's main shopping mall, opened in 1988.

=== Music scene ===
Bellingham's location between two major cities, universities, record labels, and music magazines have all contributed to making Bellingham a desirable and recognized local music scene. The presence of a large university-age population has helped Bellingham become home to a number of regionally and nationally noted musical acts such as Death Cab for Cutie, Odesza, The Posies, Crayon, Idiot Pilot, Mono Men, No-Fi Soul Rebellion, Sculptured, Federation X, The Trucks, Black Eyes & Neckties, Black Breath, The High Mountain String Band, Shimmertraps, Dizzy Spins, and Shook Ones. Local independent record labels include Estrus Records and Clickpop Records. The city was also home to What's Up! Magazine which covered the local music scene for 22 years ending in March 2020, and Lemonade Magazine, devoted to music and entertainment of all kinds.

Bellingham is also the home of an active classical music scene which includes the Bellingham Symphony Orchestra (formerly the Whatcom Symphony Orchestra), North Sound Youth Symphony, numerous community music groups and choirs, and the internationally recognized Bellingham Festival of Music.

=== Literary scene ===
Bellingham is home to an active writers community at the local universities and independent of them. Western Washington University's English Department publishes the Bellingham Review. In 2011, the city hosted the first annual Chuckanut Writers Conference, run by Whatcom Community College and Village Books, a local bookstore. Clover, A Literary Rag, a publication of the Independent Writers' Studio, has produced nine volumes since 2010. The city is home to writers including Steve Martini and George Dyson. The Bellingham Public Library provides free library services at the Central Library, Barkley Branch and Fairhaven Branch.

=== Local theater ===
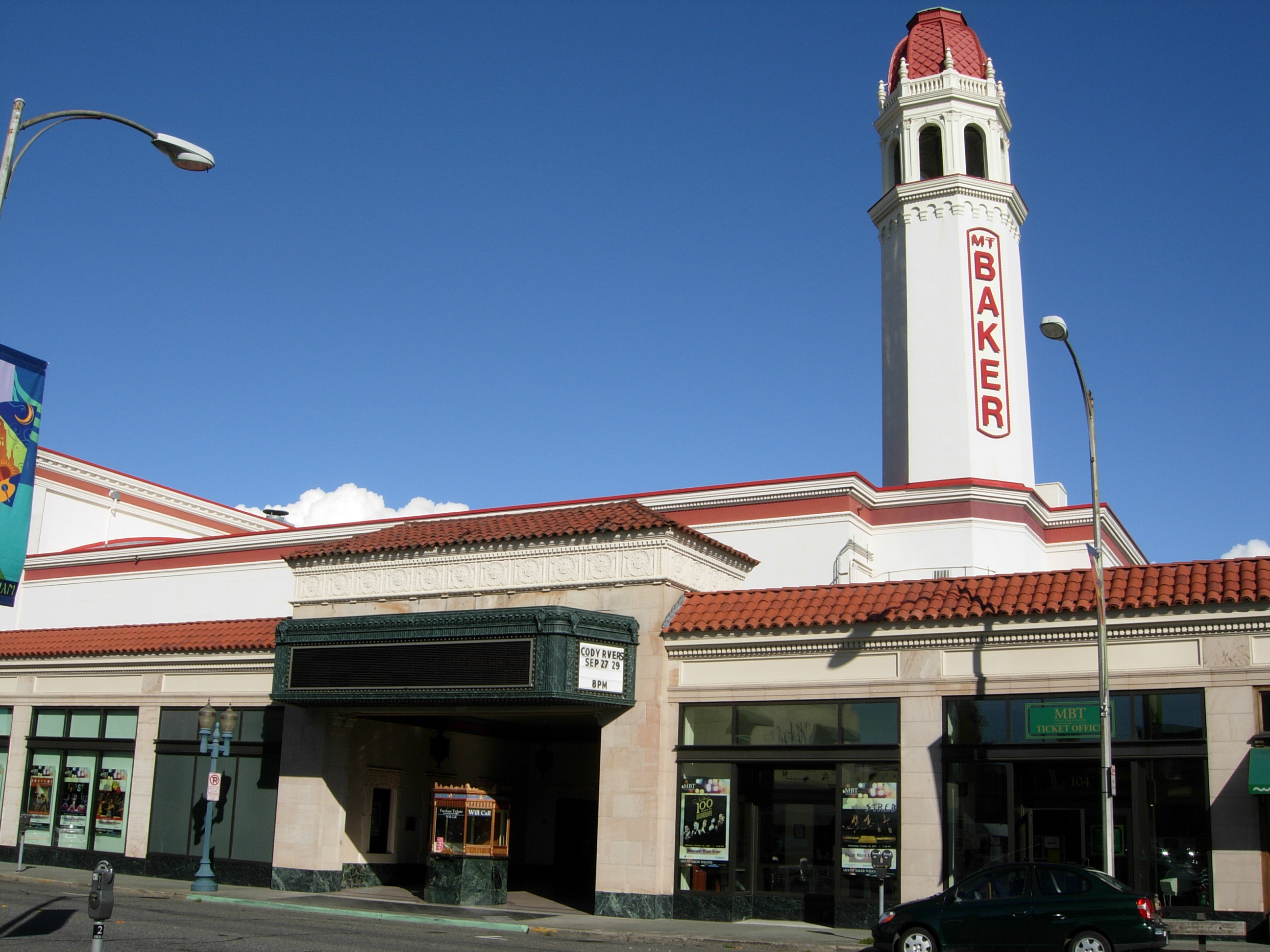
Mount Baker Theatre

Bellingham's theater culture is boosted by the performing arts department at Western Washington University. There are several theaters and productions in Bellingham:

- Bellingham Theatre Guild, a non-profit community theater was founded in 1929. Hilary Swank performed here before moving to Los Angeles to pursue her career in acting.
- Mount Baker Theatre is the largest performing arts facility north of Seattle and is listed on the register of National Historic Places. The theater is an example of Moorish architecture, with several sections of the 1927 theater having been restored over the past two decades.
- Upfront Theatre, an improv comedy venue established by Bellingham resident Ryan Stiles of Whose Line Is It Anyway? fame.
- Northwest Ballet, a regional ballet company, performs classical ballets.
- iDiOM Theater, a non-profit regional theater: almost every show is new, locally written work.
- Firehouse Performing Arts Center, a Fairhaven firehouse converted into a dance classroom and theater.

=== Activism ===
The Whatcom Peace & Justice Center was founded in 2002 by local activists, and has been one of the most active such centers in the nation.

In October 2006, the Bellingham City Council passed a Troops Home! resolution, making Bellingham the first city in the state of Washington to pass the resolution. Two years later, the City Council passed a resolution urging elected representatives and the federal government to avoid war with Iran, becoming the first city in the state to do so. In 2012, the City Council unanimously passed a resolution calling upon the federal government to overturn the Supreme Court's decision in the case of FEC v. Citizens United by declaring that U.S. Constitutional rights apply to natural persons and not to corporations. In 2014, coinciding with Columbus Day that celebrates the arrival of European explorers, the City Council officially established Coast Salish Day to celebrate the Native American peoples who continue to call the geographic region their home.

In 2015, the Seattle Arctic drilling protests spread to Bellingham when a protester chained herself to the anchor chain of a Royal Dutch Shell ship for 63 hours.

In May 2024, students at Western Washington University formed a pro-Palestine encampment outside of Old Main for two weeks. It disbanded on May 30 after negotiating with the university.

=== Future development ===
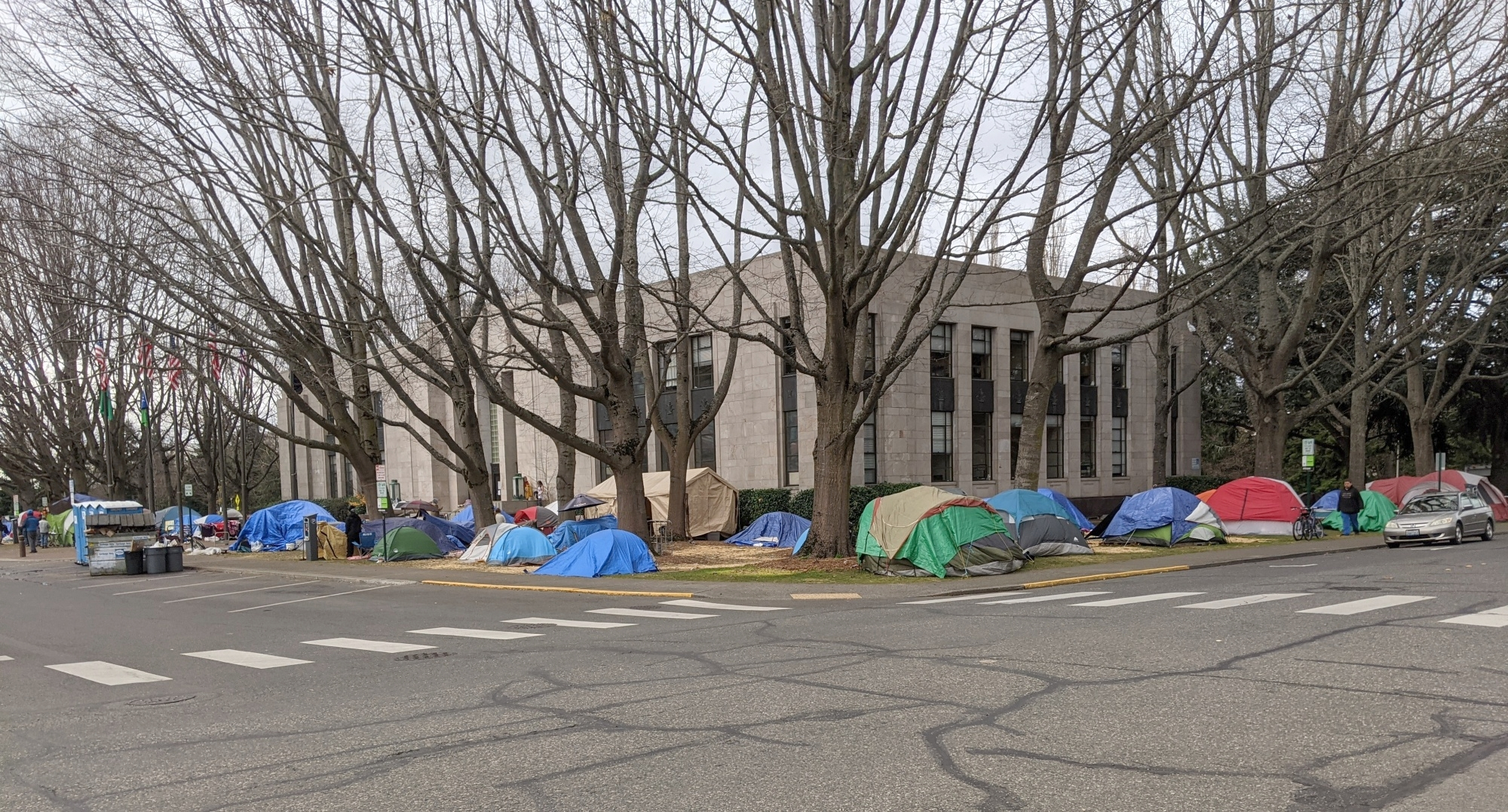
Homeless encampment around Bellingham City Hall, 2020

Bellingham saw apartment vacancy hit 0.6% in 2016, and plans to use multi-family housing to accommodate more than 50% of the projected growth in housing units (16,525 units by 2036). According to Aaron Terrazas, senior economist at Zillow, "Given the area's pace of growth, it would require very aggressive building to keep rent affordability in check."

The city has resisted expanding the Urban Growth Area for many years, and hopes to fit both multi-family and single-family growth within the city limits. Builders counter that even City planners acknowledge that the city is "largely built out" and that the remaining land is difficult or expensive to build on. Attempts to increase density, ease restrictions on 'accessory dwelling units', or even to develop land already zoned residential, are regularly met with fierce neighborhood opposition: Padden Trails was opposed by the Samish Neighborhood Association; a dense development at the Sunnyland D.O.T. site was scaled-down; Fairhaven neighbors led the effort to prevent the development of Fairhaven Highlands, (now Chuckanut Ridge), which the City ended up purchasing for $8.2 million, preventing more than 700 new housing units; neighborhood groups pressured the City Council to go against staff recommendation to rezone Squalicum Lofts for residential development.

In 2017, the Bellingham City Council began acknowledging housing affordability as a critical issue, and hosted a town hall meeting on housing affordability and homelessness.

=== Waterfront redevelopment ===
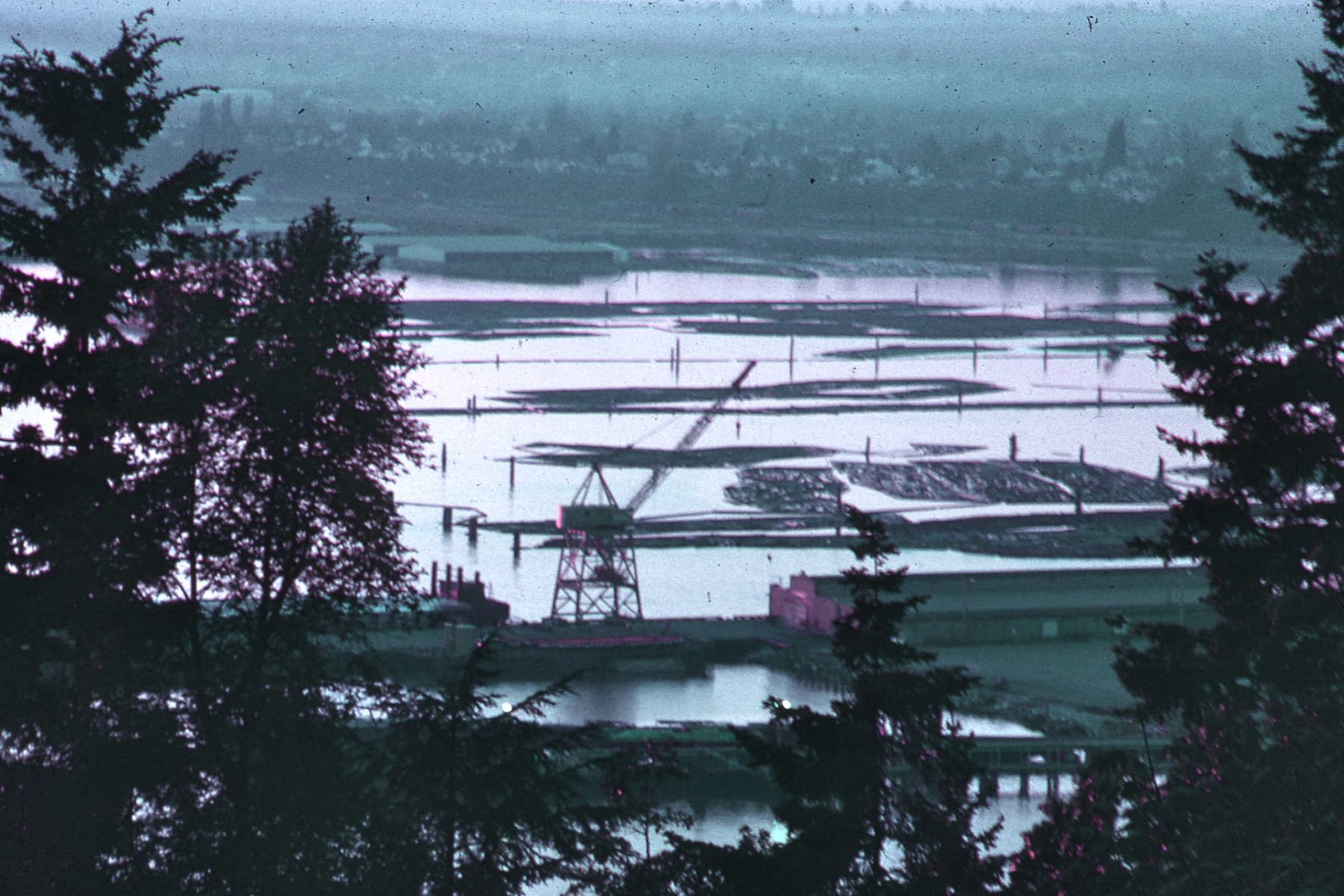
The harbor of Bellingham, Washington, filled with logs, 1972

The Bellingham waterfront has served as an industrial center for more than a century, starting with the arrival of Henry Roeder and Russell Peabody in the mid-1800s.

Georgia-Pacific (G-P) purchased the Puget Sound Pulp and Timber Company in 1963 and operated a pulp mill on the central downtown waterfront until 2001. In 1965, G-P built a chlor-alkali facility, which became a source of mercury contamination in the Whatcom Waterway and on the uplands of the site for decades. The documentary film, "Smells Like Money – The Story of Bellingham's Georgia Pacific Plant" tells the story of the site, which has since been purchased by the Port of Bellingham chiefly to create a marina in the 37-acre (15 ha) wastewater lagoon. The Port of Bellingham purchased the G-P site for $10 with the understanding that the port would assume liability for the contamination. The City of Bellingham and the Port of Bellingham entered into several interlocal agreements in which the City agreed to pay for all infrastructure costs, and the Port would create a marina, clean up the site, and retain all zoning.

The cleanup site (approximately 74 acres (30 ha)) was divided into two areas: pulp and tissue mill area and the chlor-alkali area. Contaminated soils and building materials were removed in 2011 and 2013; the Department of Ecology finalized the Interim Cleanup Work Plan in January 2017, and that work was completed in April 2017 when 31 acres were capped with a protective barrier. Work continues on evaluating cleanup alternatives for the entire chlor-alkali area of the site.

The City and Port have entered into a partnership to redevelop the property, and in 2013 contracted with Harcourt Developments to develop 19 acres (7.7 ha). The Granary Building remodel will be completed in 2017; Harcourt has submitted plans for two waterfront condo buildings in 2018 and 2019; the city planned to construct two main roads through the side in 2017.

== Sports ==
| Club | Sport | League | Stadium |
|---|---|---|---|
| Bellingham Bells | Baseball | West Coast Collegiate Baseball League | Joe Martin Stadium |
| Bellingham Slam | Basketball | International Basketball League, West Conference | Whatcom Pavilion |
| Bellingham Hockey Club | Ice hockey | JPHL | Bellingham Sportsplex |
| Bellingham Roller Betties | Roller derby | WFTDA | Whatcom Pavilion |
| Bellingham United FC | Soccer | EPLWA | Civic Stadium |
| Chuckanut Bay Geoducks | Rugby union | Pacific Northwest Rugby Football Union | Bellingham Rugby & Polo Fields |
| Bellingham Figure Skating Club | Figure skating | USFSA Recreational and Competitive Club | Bellingham Sportsplex |
| Bellingham United FC (indoor soccer) | Indoor soccer | WISL | Bellingham Sportsplex |

Bellingham has been the home of several minor league sports teams that competed in regional competitions. The Northwest League, a short-season baseball league, awarded an expansion franchise to the city in 1973. The team was known as the Bellingham Dodgers for four seasons until they became affiliated with the Seattle Mariners and were renamed to the Bellingham Mariners. They were briefly renamed to the Bellingham Giants from 1995 to 1996 and relocated to Keizer, Oregon, due to the lack of a suitable stadium. Future Hall of Famer Ken Griffey Jr. began his professional career with Bellingham Mariners in 1987. A collegiate baseball team, the Bellingham Bells, were founded in 1999 and play in the West Coast League.

The city's first minor league football team was the Bellingham Buttercups, who played for two seasons from 1930 to 1931. The Bellingham Bulldogs were established in 2008 and played for several years in various leagues until they suspended operations in 2017. The Whatcom County Vikings, named for the defunct college football program at WWU, began play in 2025.

Bellingham is located near the Mount Baker Ski Area, which offers skiing and snowboarding in the winter and kayaking and cycling in the summer. The ski area claims a world record for seasonal snowfall, with 1,140 inches (29,000 mm) recorded in the 1998–1999 season.

Western Washington University is home to NCAA Division II National Women's Rowing Champions. The Lady Vikings became Western's first NCAA champion team in 2005 and won again in 2006, 2007, 2008, 2009, 2010, 2011, 2017, and 2024, as well as winning two national championship titles at the National Collegiate Rowing Championships in 1984 and 1996 before the NCAA began holding women's rowing championships in 2002. The 2011-2012 Western Men's Basketball team won the NCAA Division II National Championship. In 2016, the nationally ranked Western Women's Soccer Team won the NCAA Division II National Championship. Western Washington University also operates a collegiate road cycling program that took top-5 positions nationwide at the 2006 nationals.

== Government ==
The City of Bellingham has a non-partisan strong-mayor, weak-council form of government. The directly elected mayor serves a four-year term. Six of the seven city council members are elected by ward for staggered four-year terms. The seventh council member is elected at-large every two years.

A municipal court judge is also elected for four-year terms.

=== Crime ===
Bellingham
- Crime rates* (2022)

Violent crimes
- Homicide: 2
- Rape: 22
- Robbery: 135
- Aggravated assault: 221
- Total violent crime: 380

Property crimes
- Burglary: 804
- Larceny-theft: 5,193
- Motor vehicle theft: 500
- Arson: 20
- Total property crime: 6,517
- Note: Reported crimes per 100,000 population Source: 2022 FBI UCR Data

The city maintains Bellingham Police Department and fire department and operates the countywide Medic One medical emergency response service through an agreement with Whatcom County. According to Uniform Crime Report statistics compiled by the Federal Bureau of Investigation (FBI) in 2022, there were 2 murders, 380 violent crimes and 6,517 property crimes per 100,000 residents. Of these, the violent crimes consisted of 22 forcible rapes, 135 robberies and 221 aggravated assaults, while 804 burglaries, 5,193 larceny-thefts, 500 motor vehicle thefts and 20 arson defined the property offenses.

== Education ==
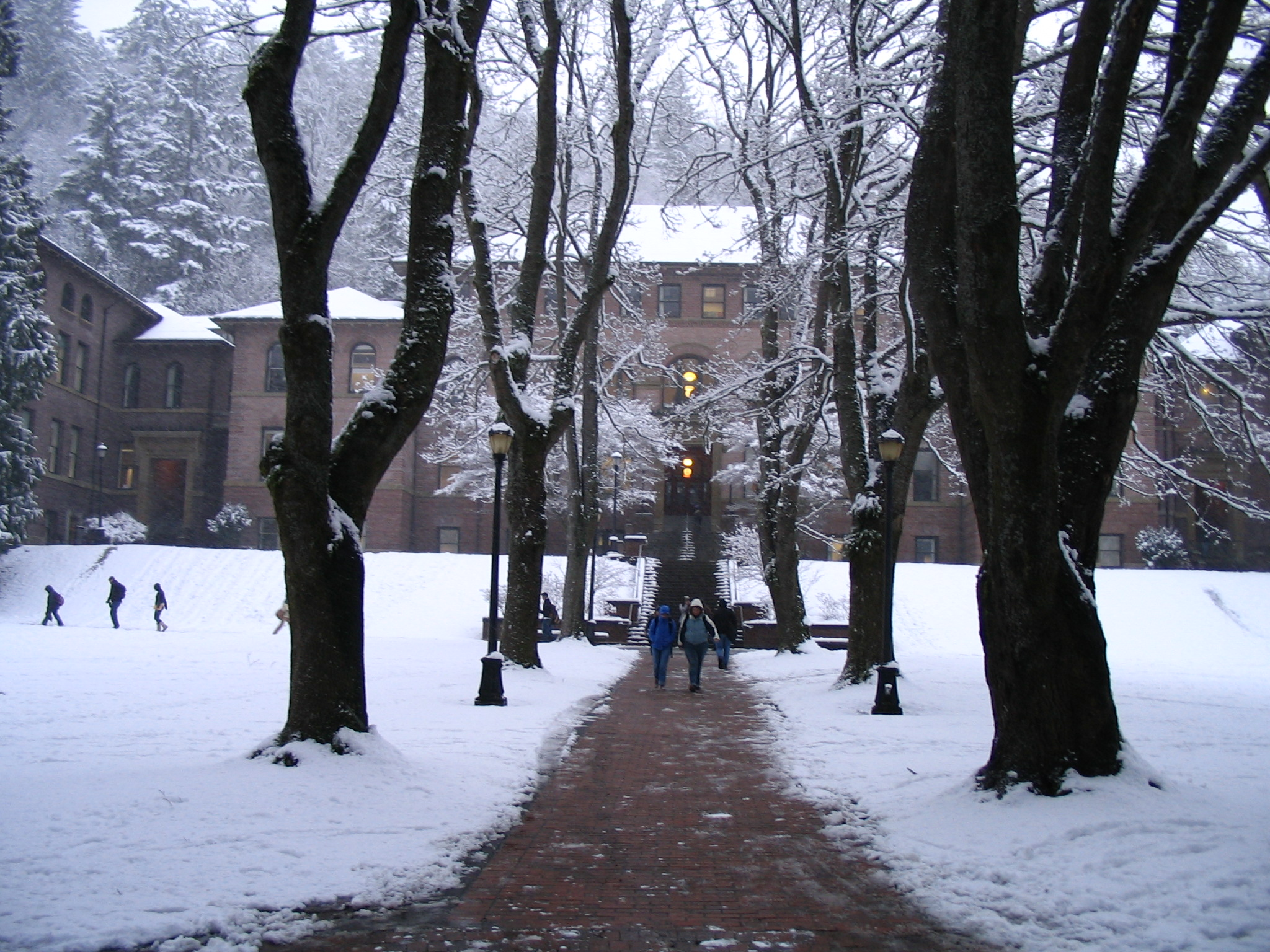
Old Main, Western Washington University in winter

Bellingham School District is the local school district for the vast majority of the municipality. There are four public high schools in Bellingham: Bellingham High School, Options High School, Sehome High School, and Squalicum High School. Bellingham has four public middle schools: Kulshan Middle School, Shuksan Middle School, Fairhaven Middle School, and Whatcom Middle School which was rebuilt after extensive fire damage in 2009.

A small portion of the city limits to the north is within the Meridian School District.

Private schools in Bellingham include Whatcom Hills Waldorf School (Prekindergarten through 8th grade), Whatcom Day Academy (Prekindergarten to 8th grade), St. Paul's Academy (Prekindergarten to 12th grade), Assumption Catholic School (Prekindergarten to 8th grade), and The Franklin Academy (Preschool to 8th grade).

Western Washington University is located in Bellingham. It has more than 16,000 students. The Northwest Film School is a private, non-profit educational institution specializing in digital media production. It operates in a partnership with Western Washington University to offer a one-year certificate in Video Production.

Bellingham has two community colleges:

- Whatcom Community College
- Bellingham Technical College

Northwest Indian College is an accredited four-year college located on the Lummi Indian Reservation near Bellingham.

Lummi Nation School has a Bellingham postal address but it is away from the city limits in an unincorporated area on the Lummi reservation.

== Media ==
=== Newspapers ===
The Bellingham Herald is published daily in Bellingham. Other newspapers include Whatcom Watch and The Front (formerly Western Front), which covers largely affairs of Western Washington University. In 2020, the Salish Current was founded as an online, nonprofit option for regional news. The Bellingham Business Journal, also known online as BBJ Today, ceased publication in 2020. Cascadia Daily News debuted on January 24, 2022, as a daily online publication and weekly print publication, replacing Cascadia Weekly, which was available until 2021.

=== Television ===
Bellingham and Whatcom County are part of the Seattle television market. The area has had exceptionally early and strong penetration of cable television since the 1950s, and there have never been any local translators of the major Seattle TV stations.

Stations in Vancouver, British Columbia, Canada, can be viewed over the air with suitable antennae, but those in Seattle are too distant to receive in most locations in the county. Whatcom County residents can also receive CBC and CTV stations via cable service. KVOS-TV, an affiliate of the Spanish-language network Univision, is available in most parts of Bellingham with an antenna as well.

The City of Bellingham also operates BTV, a public access channel available on YouTube or Xfinity channel 10.

=== Magazines ===
- Bellingham on Tap is a monthly nightlife magazine featuring complete happy hour and bar special listings, reviews, events, local interest articles, and columns including sex advice, rants, and astrology.
- Bellingham Alive Magazine is a bi-monthly lifestyle magazine focusing on life in Whatcom, Skagit, San Juan and Island counties.
- Frequency: The Snowboarder's Journal is an independent snowboarding magazine based in Bellingham, published quarterly.
- What's Up! is a monthly music magazine focused on local music. It covers live shows, band bios and new artist releases.
- Business Pulse has been covering Bellingham and Whatcom County business news and business profiles since 1975.
- Southside Living is mailed directly to residents of Bellingham's Chuckanut Drive, Edgemoor, Fairhaven, and South Hill neighborhoods.
- Trails Magazine is an independent backpacking and hiking magazine based in Bellingham and published quarterly.

=== AM radio ===
| Frequency (kHz) | Call Sign | kW (day) | kW (night) | Owner |
|---|---|---|---|---|
| 790 | KGMI | 5 | 1 | Saga Communications |
| 1170 | KPUG | 10 | 5 | Saga Communications |

=== FM radio ===
| Frequency (mHz) | Call Sign | kW | Owner |
|---|---|---|---|
| 89.3 | KUGS | 0.1 | Western Washington University |
| 91.7 | KZAZ | 0.12 | Washington State University |
| 92.9 | KISM | 50 | Saga Communications |
| 102.3 | KMRE-LP | 0.1 | American Museum of Radio and Electricity |
| 104.1 | KAFE | 60 | Saga Communications |
| 106.5 | KWPZ | 63 | Crista Ministries |

== Infrastructure ==
=== Transportation ===
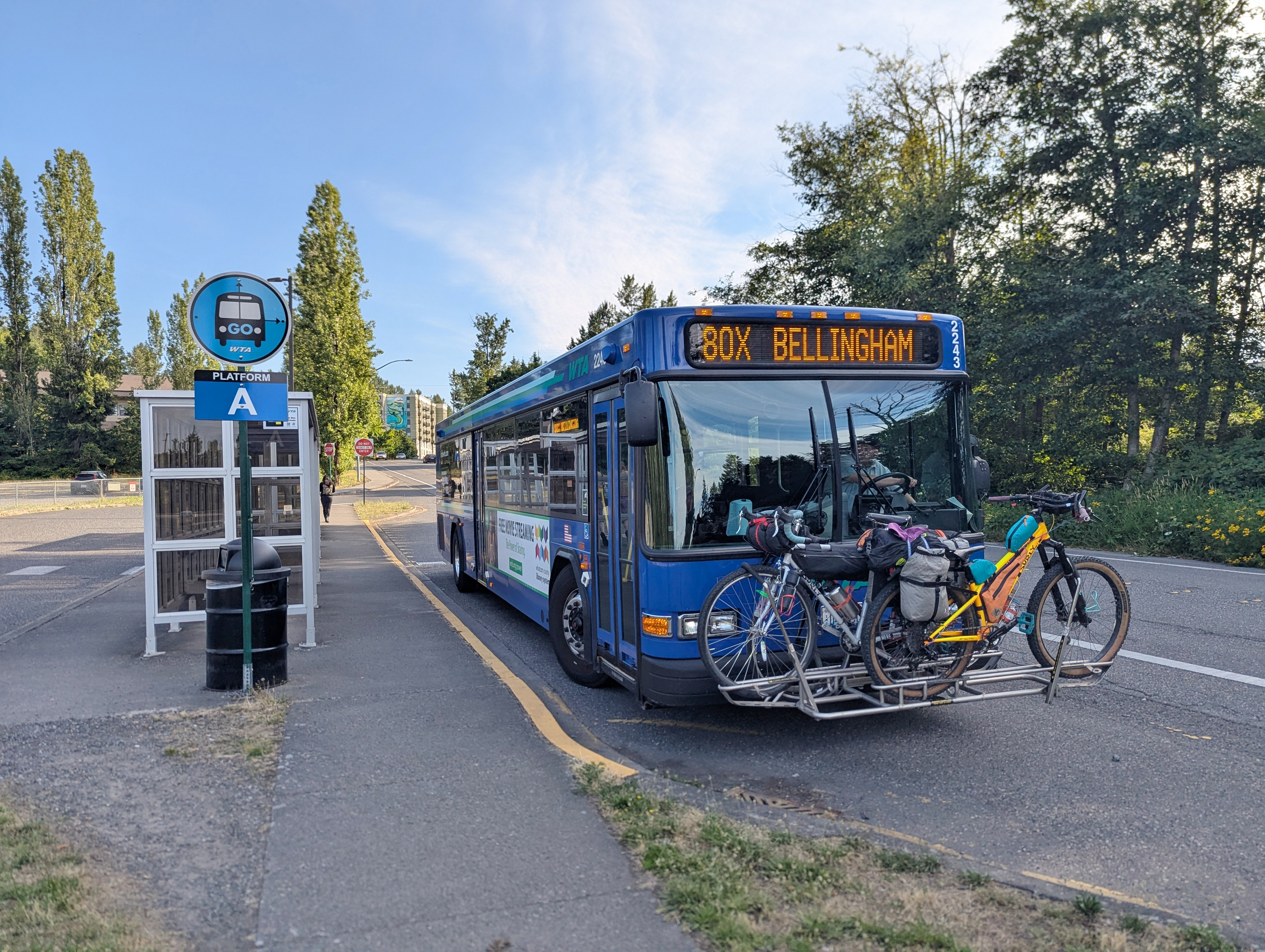
A local bus operated by the Whatcom Transportation Authority

Bellingham is bisected by Interstate 5 (I-5), which connects it to Seattle, Vancouver, and Portland, Oregon. The city also has three state highways: State Route 11, a scenic byway through the Chuckanut Mountains; State Route 539, which connects to Lynden and the Canadian border; and State Route 542, which travels east to the Mount Baker Ski Area. The city's streets were originally named in alphabetical order from the waterfront's never-built Army Street, increasing by one letter per block; several name changes in the early 20th century broke the naming scheme's order.

The Bellingham International Airport offers scheduled commuter flights to and from Seattle and Friday Harbor, Washington, and regularly scheduled jet service to various West Coast airports via Alaska Airlines, Allegiant Air, and San Juan Airlines, and it was formerly served by Southwest Airlines. Alaska Airlines and Allegiant Air used to fly to Hawaii from Bellingham, serving Honolulu, Kahului, and Kona at various times, but this service ceased by 2019. The airport is home of the first Air and Marine Operations Center, to assist the US Department of Homeland Security with border surveillance.

The Port of Bellingham is a government agency, created in 1920, which operates two marinas, port facilities, and the Bellingham International Airport, as well as other facilities around Whatcom County. The Port operates 1,663 acres (673 ha) of port land, and owns 90 buildings.

The Whatcom Transportation Authority (WTA) is the county's public transit agency and operates fixed bus service within Bellingham and its neighboring cities. The agency has several hubs, including the downtown station, the Western Washington University campus, and Cordata Station near Bellis Fair Mall, which is served by BoltBus intercity express buses to Seattle and Vancouver. Several corridors have frequent service that is branded as "Go Lines", with service every 15 minutes. WTA also offers intercity service to Mount Vernon, connecting with Skagit Transit for onward service to Everett.

The city's main train station, Fairhaven Station, is served by scheduled Amtrak Cascades service to Vancouver and Seattle twice a day. Amtrak also operates one Thruway bus trip to supplement its train service on the corridor. The Bellingham Cruise Terminal is adjacent to the Amtrak station and serves as the southern terminus of the Alaska Marine Highway, a state-run ferry for passengers and vehicles. The ferries provide service to Ketchikan, Juneau, Prince Rupert, and Haines. The terminal is also served by San Juan Cruises, which provides seasonal passenger ferry service to the San Juan Islands and Friday Harbor.

== Notable people ==
- AeTopus (Bryan Tewell Hughes) – electronic music composer and producer
- Bob Arbogast – radio-television host and voice actor
- Jon Auer – vocalist, guitarist, songwriter, founding member of the Posies
- Steve Baker – professional motorcycle racer
- Carlos Becerra – TV presenter
- Billy Burke – television and film actor
- Brett Cooper - political commentator and actress
- Ramsey Denison – documentary filmmaker, editor
- J. J. Donovan – Washington state businessman and politician
- Raymond Evans - USCG and Recipient of the Navy Cross
- Ben Gibbard – lead singer for Death Cab for Cutie
- Ryan Hietala – professional golfer
- Yolanda Hughes-Heying – IFBB professional bodybuilder
- Paul Jessup – world record holder for discus
- Oscar Jimenez – soccer player for Louisville City FC
- Anna Leader – poet and novelist
- Jake Locker – quarterback for University of Washington and NFL's Tennessee Titans
- Dana Lyons – folk and alternative rock musician, author, environmentalist
- Cuddles Marshall – major league baseball player for the New York Yankees and St. Louis Browns
- Philip McCracken – artist, sculptor, activist
- Jason McGerr – drummer for Death Cab for Cutie
- Finn McKenty - American Internet Personality, Music & Entertainment Journalist
- Tommy Noonan – Actor, He played in Gentlemen Prefer Blondes
- Stephen Oswald – former pilot and NASA astronaut
- Doug Pederson – former head coach of the Jacksonville Jaguars of the National Football League
- Alfred Pettibone (1835–1914) – Washington state pioneer, one of the first residents of Bellingham
- Jeff Ragsdale – author, activist, national game show champion
- Taylor Rapp – NFL safety for the Buffalo Bills
- Roger Repoz – major league baseball player
- Charles Roehl (1857–1927) – Bellingham pioneer and businessman
- William Roehl (1890–1968) – Bellingham pioneer and businessman
- Jim Sterk - former athletic director for Missouri
- Ryan Stiles – comedian on Whose Line Is It Anyway?
- Ken Stringfellow – vocalist, guitarist, founding member of the Posies
- Hilary Swank – actress
- Al Swift, former member of the United States House of Representatives.
- Phoebe Wahl – artist and author
- Don Warren - NFL tight end and executive
- Ben Weber – film and television actor
- Christopher Wise – author

== Sister cities ==
Bellingham maintains sister city relationships with five Pacific Rim port cities and Vaasa, Finland.

| City | State / Prefecture / Region | Country | Year |
|---|---|---|---|
| Tateyama | Chiba | Japan | 1958 |
| Port Stephens | New South Wales | Australia | 1982 |
| Nakhodka | Primorsky Krai | Russia | 1989 |
| Punta Arenas | Magallanes | Chile | 1996 |
| Cheongju | Chungcheongbuk-do | South Korea | 2008 |
| Vaasa | Ostrobothnia | Finland | 2009 |
| Tsetserleg | Arkhangai | Mongolia | 2011 |

Tateyama and Port Stephens are also sister cities with each other.

Bellingham Sister Cities Association promotes Bellingham's sister city relationships. The relationship with Tateyama is the most active and includes regular events such as an annual city hall staff exchange and community cultural visits. Tateyama frequently fields a team for the annual Ski to Sea Race, or at minimum has representation in the Ski to Sea parade.

== See also ==
- Fairhaven
- New Whatcom
- Olympic pipeline explosion
