= Bellingham waterfront =

Coordinates: 48.7505°N 122.4848°W

The Bellingham Waterfront consists of the land along Bellingham Bay in Whatcom County, Washington, United States. It is mostly in Bellingham, Washington and other surrounding neighborhoods and cities. Various Bellingham neighborhoods are along the waterfront including is shared with Fairhaven.

Neighboring bodies of water include Lummi Bay, Samish Bay, Padilla Bay, Skagit Bay, Boundary Bay and others.

The area was historically an industrial center with lumber processing, salmon canning and other businesses, and is being redeveloped with housing, shopping, activities and conference space.

== History ==
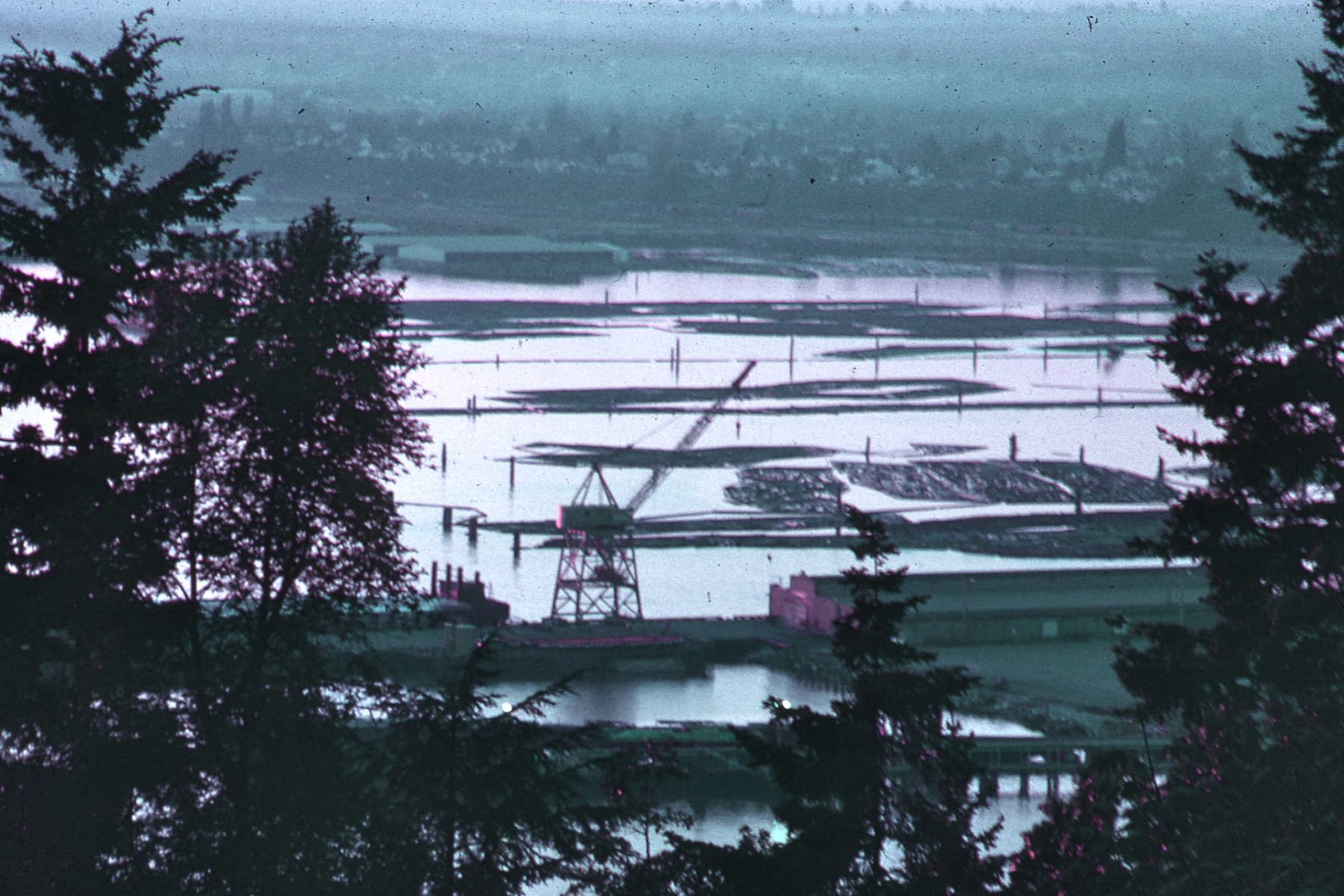
The harbor of Bellingham, Washington, filled with logs, 1972

The waterfront of Bellingham, Washington is dominated by the 137-acre (0.55 km^{2}) site of Georgia Pacific's former pulp, chemical plant and tissue mill, the latter slated to cease operations in December 2007. Controversy surrounds the current efforts to redevelop the site, particularly the issue of the disposal of mercury-contaminated sediments and soils.

The property consists of two main portions: the plant site itself and the so-called Aerated Stabilization Basin (ASB), part of the plant's wastewater treatment system. The ASB is a large lagoon enclosed by an earthen breakwater built atop former tidelands across the Whatcom waterway from the plant site.

The waterfront has served as an industrial center since the late nineteenth century. In the areas currently slated for redevelopment, salmon canning gave way to pulp and paper production in the early twentieth century. In 1963 the Georgia Pacific company purchased the Puget Sound Pulp and Timber Company and operated a pulp mill on the central downtown waterfront until 2001. In 1965 Georgia Pacific built a Chlor-Alkali facility that operated until 1999. A tissue mill existed on the same site from 1926 and ceased operations December 21, 2007. While the siting of an industrial and chemical operation on the waterfront fell increasingly out of favor over the years, the plant was a significant source of family-wage employment for residents of the city.

Portions of the waterfront are heavily contaminated due to the area's historical industrial uses. The environmental problems stem primarily from G-P's operation of the chlor-alkali plant to manufacture chlorine and other chemicals. The process released many tons of mercury into the Whatcom Creek waterway. Some areas of the upland portions of the site are also contaminated with significant concentrations of mercury. By contrast, the ASB—the only area scheduled for the removal of toxins—is clean.

Other areas of the waterfront are contaminated as a result of the historic use as a municipal waste landfill, which served as a disposal ground for the waste while creating additional dry land.

== Redevelopment ==
In June 2006, Georgia Pacific sold the property (valued at US$37 million) to the Port of Bellingham for $10 in exchange for assuming responsibility for the environmental cleanup of the property. The company retained a lease on the portion of the property occupied by the tissue mill operation until it closed down.

The city and port have entered into a partnership to jointly clean up and redevelop the property, which is to be branded "The Waterfront District." A general plan for the city's waterfront was developed several years ago by the Waterfront Futures Group, and the new Waterfront Advisory Group has been convening to develop a more detailed plan focused on this particular site.

There are currently plans for a "Container Village" for food and retail at WayPoint Park at the Bellingham Waterfront. Bellingham is undergoing redevelopment on more than 100 acres (40 ha) of former industrial land in its Waterfront District, with a hotel, conference center, condos, retirement living, retail and commercial development planned for the site.

=== Marina controversy ===
One source of controversy is the conflict between the port's long-standing plans to convert the ASB into a pleasure-boat marina and advocacy groups' interest in using the ASB to facilitate a more comprehensive cleanup of the contaminated sediments in the waterway. Several citizens watchdog groups have formed in response to this controversy, including the Bellingham Bay Foundation in 2005. ReSources is another organization in Bellingham that has focused on the cleanup of Bellingham Bay in general and has advocated for the full removal of all mercury contamination present in the nearshore areas of Bellingham Bay.

During the summer of 2006, the Bellingham Bay Foundation formed People for a Healthy Bay over a concern that many of the areas slated for development contained high mercury levels (as high as 12,500ppm) in the soil under the former Chlor-Alkali facility. People for a Healthy Bay launched an initiative that would have required the City of Bellingham to advocate for removal of mercury to the highest practical level. Despite 6400 signatures gathered in 20 days and overwhelming public support for the initiative, the City successfully sued to keep the initiative off the ballot. The initiative reflected polling data performed by the Foundation that the citizens of Bellingham care most that their waterfront is clean and safe.

Meanwhile, the port has continued to move forward with plan incorporating a marina in the ASB.

== Current status ==
The Consent Decree for the Whatcom Waterway and ASB has been signed by the Washington State Department of Ecology, The Department of Natural Resources, the City of Bellingham, the Port of Bellingham, and many other agencies. The City of Bellingham and Port of Bellingham were scheduled to develop the final EIS and Master Plan for the upland, but citing objections to the City of Bellingham's street grid, the city's reluctance to sign a Planned Action Ordinance, among many other issues, the Port has retreated from the process. The City remains hopeful that the Port will return to the process. The City of Bellingham issues the permit for the marina.
