= Flag of Bellingham, Washington =

Bellingham, Washington

The flag of Bellingham, Washington, in the United States, is resembled by stars, wavy lines, and a half circle on the side of the flag. The center and right sides of the flag have an alternating striped pattern, changing from light green to dark green. Brad Lockhart designed the flag, and it was considered official on April 24, 2017, but it was previously known to be unofficial.

== Design ==
Brad Lockhart designed the flag after listening to a TED talk given by Roman Mars. The blue half-circle represents the Bay to the west, the stars representing indigenous tribes such as the Lummi Nation and Nooksack Indian Tribe. The three wavy lines represent noisy waters and rivers, and the stripes symbolize the four cities that merged to become the city of Bellingham.

== History ==
The flag was considered official on April 24, 2017, and was shown to the City Council on August 29, 2016.
