= Frequency: The Snowboarder's Journal =

- Editor: Jeff Galbraith
- Publisher: Funny Feelings (LLC)
- Founded: 2001
- Country: USA
- Based in: Mount Baker (Bellingham, WA)
- Website: www.frqncy.com

The Snowboarder's Journal is published quarterly by Funny Feelings (LLC). Originally frequency: The Snowboarder's Journal, the publication rebranded in 2016, simplifying the name to The Snowboarder's Journal. Four coffee-table journals with high production quality and limited advertising are produced yearly in limited editions featuring the personalities and places that make up snowboard culture worldwide. Founded 2001 in Seattle, WA and relocated to Mount Baker (Bellingham, WA) in 2002, The Snowboarder's Journal has been headed from the start by longtime snowboard editor Jeff Galbraith. Features editorial from around the world and interviews and travel pieces with young Olympians and backwoods icons.

== Awards ==
- Winner of the 2006 Maggie Award for Best Quarterly
