= Ski to Sea Race =

Multi-sport race in Whatcom County, Washington, US

The Ski to Sea Race (S2S), widely known as the Ski to Sea, is a seven-legged, 93-mile (150 km) long, multi-event competition held on the Sunday of Memorial Day weekend in Whatcom County. The race starts on the ski slopes of Mount Baker Ski Area, and ends at Marine Park in Fairhaven, on the shore of Bellingham Bay. The seven legs of the race are cross-country skiing, downhill skiing or snowboarding, running, road biking, canoeing, cyclo-cross biking, and kayaking. The Ski to Sea Race is managed by Whatcom Events, with a race committee that includes a race director, an operations assistant, one or two chairmen to oversee each event, a volunteer coordinator along with nearly 900 volunteers.

== History ==
The Ski to Sea has its origins in the Mount Baker Marathons of 1911–1913. The early races ran from the city of Bellingham to the top of Mount Baker and back. Racers could pick between two routes to Mt. Baker, the Glacier trail or the Deming route. If choosing Glacier, a special train transported racers to that location. If choosing Deming, racers would drive to Heisler's ranch. Once at either of these two destinations, racers continued on to the Mt. Baker summit by foot. The event was canceled after a runner fell into a crevasse. The Ski to Sea would be a toned-down version of those races where people race from the ski slopes of Mount Baker to Bellingham Bay.

The race was first proposed in a letter written in 1966 from Bob Stephens, Fred Elsethagen, and Franz Gabl to Bill Herb, the president of the Bellingham Chamber of Commerce. The name of the race came from the Bellingham slogan of "Sea to Ski in Sixty Minutes", referring to the proximity of Mount Baker's ski slopes to Bellingham, which sits on a bay of the Strait of Georgia.

The first official Ski to Sea race premiered 1973 as a side event to "Blossom Time". The first race had 177 people racing in a total of fifty teams. During the first four years, the legs of the race were run separately, and their times added up to produce a total team time; this left racers and spectators waiting several hours after the race concluded to find out who had won. Since 1977 the race has been a continuous event, with the exception of 2008 when the canoe leg was cancelled because of unsafe river conditions.

By 1977, the Ski to Sea Race had become so popular that the entire Blossom Time festival was renamed Blossom Time Ski to Sea. Six years later, "Blossom Time" was removed and the event became known simply as the Ski to Sea. Even the parade was renamed the Ski to Sea Parade. Today, the Ski to Sea is considered an entire weekend-long event that is centered on the race. More than 300 teams with over two thousand racers participate in the race. Tens of thousands of spectators gather along the sidelines to watch and participate in events throughout Bellingham, Ferndale, and Fairhaven, near the finish line at Marine Park.

== Legs ==
The original letter written by Fred Elsethagen recommended nine events: skiing, mountaineering, canoeing, kayaking, horseback riding, water skiing, running, fishing boat and sailboat. Over the years all but four (mountaineering, horse back riding, fishing boat, waterskiing) of these events have been used, and only one not recommended (bicycling) has been added.

When the Ski to Sea debuted in 1973, the race covered 35 miles (56 km) in three legs: downhill skiing, bicycling, and canoeing or kayaking the Nooksack River. Over the next twenty years, the Ski to Sea would grow to seven legs covering 94 miles (151 km). It has also become a continuous event, with a token (wrist-band or timing chip) passed from one teammate to the other at the end of each leg. Though the race has kept the various legs in the same order, over the years most legs had been modified in one form or another. Some legs have changed the methods used to complete them, and most have adjusted their lengths on at least one occasion. The bicycling leg has changed length a total of nine times with the shortest distance being 20 miles (32 km) and the longest being 42 miles (68 km).

As of 2018, racers have been permitted to participate in up to three legs for one or multiple teams, meaning teams can be composed of as few as three racers.

In 2015, low snowpack forced the replacement of the ski legs with new alpine running and mountain biking legs, for a total of two running and three cycling legs. The new running leg was added at the beginning of the race, before the established road running leg, and the new mountain bike leg was added at the end, after the kayak leg. The standard format was resumed the following year.

=== Cross country skiing ===
Cross country skiing, added in 1979, kicks off the Race. This leg consists of two figure-eight loops, beginning and ending at the upper Mount Baker Ski area. It has been extended from one mile in the first three years to four miles at present.

=== Downhill skiing/snowboarding ===
Downhill skiing is one of the original components of the race. Skiers hike uphill for approximately 1.5 miles, ascending nearly a thousand feet of elevation, and then ski back to near their starting point.

=== Running ===
Added in 1975, the third stage of the race is an 8 mi (13 km) foot race down the Mount Baker Highway, from the upper Mount Baker ski area to the Shuksan Department of Transportation station. The runners drop over two thousand feet in elevation. To further the difficulties, the racers are running on hard asphalt. The running leg has been the most unchanged of the events. The first two years' running leg was 5 miles (8 km) long. The third year running was 7 miles (11 km). The fourth year, in 1979, the running leg was extended to 8 mi (13 km) and has remained unchanged since that time.

=== Road biking ===
Bicycling, the longest leg of the race by distance, was one of the original components of the 1973 event. The road bicycle leg passes through the towns of Glacier and Maple Falls, and leaves the Mount Baker Highway for Silver Lake Road. The road bicycle leg finishes on the banks of the Nooksack River in the town of Everson. The leg has changed distance on eight different occasions. It debuted at 22 miles (35 km), and would later grow to a maximum distance of 42 miles (68 km). Starting in 1987, the bicycling leg was 36 miles (58 km) long. Since 2010, the distance has again been roughly 42 miles (68 km) as the bikes go north from Maple Falls on Silver Lake Road, though some small changes in the race course have occurred.

=== Canoeing ===
Canoeing was one of the original events from the 1973 race. The canoe leg is the second longest by distance, covering 18.5 miles (29.8 km), but typically is the longest leg by duration. When first introduced in 1973, this leg allowed both two-man canoes and one-man kayaks. After sea kayaks were made the only mode of transportation for the final leg of the race, they were eliminated as an option for the Nooksack River leg of the race. This leg of the race is the only leg with two racers, and starts in Everson and ends at Hovander Park in Ferndale.

The canoe leg was canceled in 2008 (and almost canceled in 1997) because of the unsafe level of the Nooksack River.

This is possibly the most dangerous part of the race. Lorri Rasmussen of Bellingham was killed in 2002 while training for the race. Her canoe tipped and she was swept up in a log jam.

=== Cyclocross biking ===
Added in 1990, the Cyclocross bike leg stretches from the banks of the Nooksack River in Hovander Park to Squalicum Harbor on Bellingham Bay.

The course is often updated, most recently in 2023, when the course was updated to be approximately 11 miles (18 km) long.

=== Kayaking ===
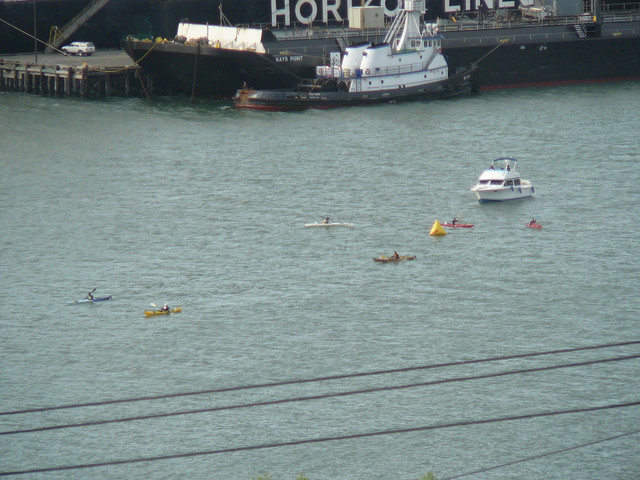
Kayakers in 2007.

The Bellingham Bay leg was added in 1980, and it was made exclusively a kayaking event in 1992. The final leg of the event that stretched across Bellingham Bay was added to tie in the Ski to Sea name and to add a more exciting finish to the race. Originally this leg used Hobie cats, though sailboats were allowed in 1981. In 1990 the choice of sailboats or sea kayaks was added for this leg of the Ski to Sea Race. Two years later, the leg was restricted to kayaks, because wind to move sailboats is unreliable on Bellingham Bay.

Today, kayakers paddle 5 miles (8 km) across Bellingham Bay from Squalicum Harbor on the north side of Bellingham to Marine Park in Fairhaven on the south side of Bellingham, then beach their kayaks and run across land to ring a bell at the finish line.

== The baton ==
The first several races used an actual baton. Later, necklace medallions were added and racers had to place the medallion over around the neck of their teammate as they tagged off to the next event. For many years, a sweatband, worn on the wrist, took the place of the medallion. Racers would pass the sweatband to their teammate racing the next leg at the transition points.

In recent years, the race has used transponder timing, and teams have carried an electronic timing chip. The chip was originally attached to a lanyard and was updated to a neoprene wristband in 2011. The timing chip tracks the team time as well as the length of each leg by being "swiped", or passed in front of a panel, at a timing tent located at the start and end of each leg. The chip has to be swiped at the end of the race by the kayaker before ringing a ceremonial bell.

== Divisions ==
Although everyone races in the same Ski to Sea Race, teams register in nine divisions: Competitive, Recreational, Corporate, Veterans, High School, Whatcom County, Car Free, Masters, and Family. Three of the divisions—Competitive, Recreational, and Whatcom County—have additional sub-divisions of "Open" (three or fewer females), "Mixed" (four or more females), and "Female" (women only). Typically almost half of the teams register in the Recreational divisions, and about a quarter in the Competitive divisions. Since the divisions were established, almost every winning team has come from the Competitive Open division, with winning teams from 1987 and 2016 coming from the Whatcom County Open division.

In the past, when different types of boats were allowed in the water events, further subdivisions existed accordingly.

== 2020 and 2021 Cancellations ==
On March 23, 2020, the organization responsible for organizing the Ski to Sea race announced that the race scheduled for May 24, 2020, would be cancelled due to the COVID-19 outbreak. On February 16, 2021, the organizers cancelled the 2021 race due to ongoing pandemic concerns. These were the only years that the race was cancelled since its inception in 1973.
