= Salish Current =

News website in Washington, U.S.

- Type: Online newspaper
- Publisher: Amy Nelson
- Managing editor: Mike Sato
- Founded: 2020
- Headquarters: Bellingham, Washington
- Website: salish-current.org

The Salish Current is a nonprofit news website serving Whatcom, Skagit and San Juan counties in northwestern Washington state in the United States. Founded in 2020 to address a gap in local news coverage, its articles are free to read and is supported through reader donations. It covers topics such as local government, environmental issues, public health, and social justice. The Salish Current is a member of the Institute for Nonprofit News.

The Salish Current has republishing agreements with other nonprofit newsrooms including KNKX and ICT.

== See also ==
- Media in Bellingham, Washington
