= Windward High School =

Location
- 5275 Northwest Drive; Bellingham, WA 98226; United States; 48.835265°N 122.568143°W

Information
- Type: Public high school
- Motto: An Academic Adventure
- Established: 2004
- School district: Ferndale School District
- Principal: Kimberly Hawes
- Faculty: 17
- Grades: 9-12
- Education system: Small schools movement
- Team name: Wolves
- Newspaper: Howler
- Yearbook: Navigator
- Feeder schools: Horizon Middle School; Vista Middle School
- Grants received: Bill and Melinda Gates Foundation; Connecting School and Community
- Telephone: (360) 383-9150
- Mailing Address: PO Box 428; Ferndale, WA 98248
- Website: official website

Windward High School is the newer of two public high schools of the Ferndale School District (district 502), in Bellingham, Washington. Windward is part of the Small Schools Project, funded in part by a grant from the Gates Foundation, which seeks to establish small intimate learning environments within communities.

Windward offers courses in Science, Math, English, Social Studies, Spanish, Japanese, Technology, Fine Arts, Performing Arts and Physical Education. With a very low student-to-teacher ratio, and a project-based education model, each course emphasizes collaboration among students and with faculty in a team-approach. The school does not offer sports or many after-school extra-curricular activities; instead its students frequently participate in these functions at the nearby affiliated Ferndale High School. There are several after-school clubs run by teachers, including a Tech Club which fixes and donates old computers.

Due to financial reasons, the district shut down Windward High school at the end of the 2017–2018 school year. The last day was June 15, 2018.

== See also ==
- Small schools movement
