= Whatcom Educational Credit Union =

Credit union in Bellingham, Washington, U.S.

WECU
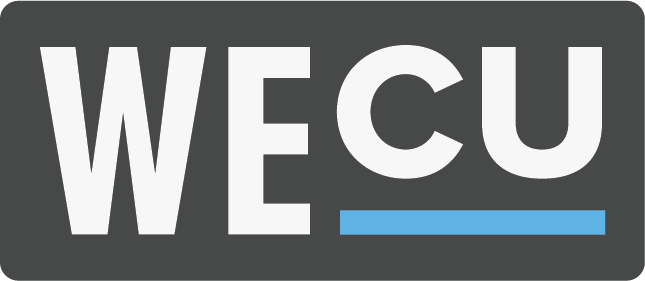
- Logo of WECU since 2018
- Formerly: Bellingham Teachers Credit Union (1936–1975)
- Type: Private
- Founded: 1936; 90 years ago in Bellingham, Washington, U.S.
- Area served: Washington
- Key people: Jennifer Kutcher (president and CEO)
- Website: wecu.com

Whatcom Educational Credit Union (branded as WECU) is a credit union serving Whatcom County and the U.S. state of Washington. WECU is a not-for-profit credit union insured by the NCUA.

== History ==
The Bellingham Teachers Credit Union (BTCU) was established in 1936, and membership was opened to faculty and staff of what is now Western Washington University. In 1972, BTCU opened to faculty and staff of Whatcom County Community College (now Whatcom Community College). Bellingham Teachers Credit Union was renamed Whatcom Educational Credit Union in 1975.

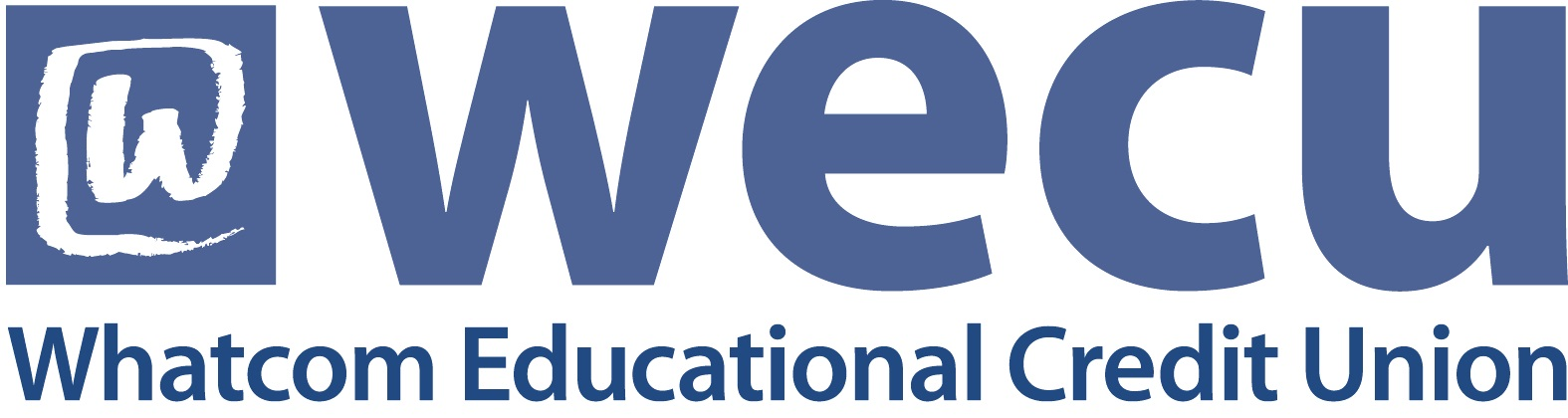
Former WECU logo, the "flying W"

At the end of 2015, WECU broke $1 billion in total deposits. With growth continuing, in 2018, WECU underwent a major rebranding. In this rebrand, WECU began primarily using the acronym form of their name to emphasize WE. The logo was changed during the rebrand, replacing the former "flying W" logo which had been used for roughly 50 years. In an effort to give back to their community, WECU donated $25,000 towards early childhood education during the rebrand.

WECU's mobile banking was revamped in 2018, but satisfaction in the app was low. In 2023, American Banker reported that WECU had improved their app experience, which raised customer satisfaction levels, resulting in a higher loan volume and an increase in WECU's net promoter score.

WECU has continued their commitment to community throughout their existence. For example, WECU partnered with Bellingham Public Schools in 2023 by providing learning spaces for students within their branch locations. In 2024, WECU expanded their existing partnerships with Bellingham-based sports franchises by sponsoring the Western Washington Vikings and the Bellingham Bells.

== Governance ==
As a credit union, WECU is nonprofit and member-owned, serving as a financial cooperative. WECU uses board governance, including a board of directors and a supervisory committee. Since 2014, Jennifer Kutcher has been President & Chief Executive Officer of WECU, the highest position in the institution.
