= Squalicum High School =

Coordinates: 48°47′03″N 122°25′22″W

- 3773 East McLeod Road; Bellingham, Washington, United States

Information
- Type: Public
- Motto: Storm Pride State Wide!
- Established: 1998
- School district: Bellingham School District
- Dean: Katie Ruthford
- Principal: Laurel Peak
- Staff: 62.36 (FTE)
- Grades: 9-12
- Enrollment: 1,241 (2023-2024)
- Student to teacher ratio: 19.90
- Colors: Navy & Silver
- Athletics conference: Northwest Conference 2A
- Mascot: Storm
- Rival: Sehome High School; Bellingham High School
- Website: squalicum.bellinghamschools.org

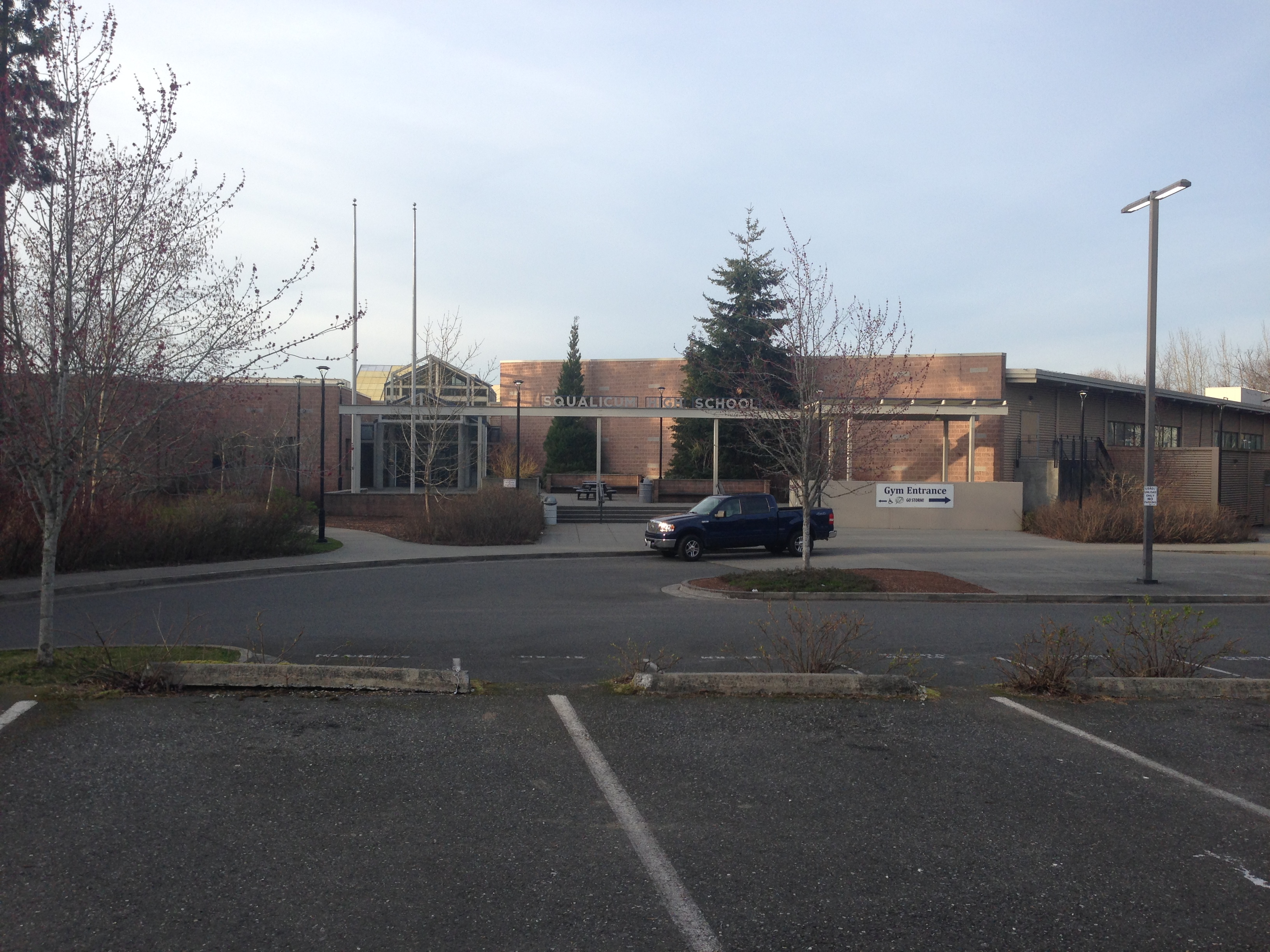
Squalicum High School entry

Squalicum High School (SqHS or SQHS) is a public school in Bellingham, Washington, United States, and is part of the Bellingham School District. The school serves the northeast population of Bellingham, including the area surrounding Lake Whatcom. Squalicum takes students from Shuksan Middle School and Whatcom Middle School.

== History ==
Squalicum opened in September, 1998 as part of a project titled "High Schools of the Future." The school was designed with three administrative "houses" - Mountain, Bay and Sky - which have views of Mount Baker, Bellingham Bay and open scenery, respectively. Built on a wetland, the building had to deal with a number of environmental concerns.

Squalicum absorbed the students of Bellingham High School for two years while the latter was being remodeled.

Squalicum High School's mission statement is to promote the intellectual, physical, social and emotional development of its students which, in turn, will allow them to be successful in a diverse and changing world. With Squalicum´s extended number of clubs and resources, the goal can be further achieved.

== Athletics ==
The most notable of the eighteen varsity sports teams at Squalicum is the girls' cross country team, who won state championships in 2003, 2004 and 2006, and finished in the top three in state every year from 2002-2008. The boys' basketball team finished third in state in 2008. Also in 2008, the boys' and girls' cross country teams each finished third in state. In 2009, the boys' varsity basketball team took first place overall in the 2A section and repeated as state champions again in 2010. Squalicum Storm boys' soccer won the state championship for 2A boys' soccer in Washington state. Squalicum Girls' soccer team had numerous state visits, beginning in 2012]. In 2021 the boys’ cross country team were the district 2A and state champions.

== Activities ==
Squalicum boasts over 25 different clubs in various areas.

=== Academic ===
AVID, Bridge Building, Culinary, Debate, Drama, FBLA, Honor Society, Prevention, Rotary Interact, Yearbook

=== Performing arts ===
Band, Choir (mixed, concert, and chamber), Orchestra (nova, concert, and chamber), Drama, Washington State Thespian troupe #7611

=== Service ===
Rotary Interact, Key, Mentors

=== Social ===
360 Breakers, Cheerleading, Chamber Orchestra (formerly a class, currently a club), Guitar, Hiking, Mariachi (Discontinued), Mecha, United Diversity, Zodiac
