= Wickersham, Washington =

Unincorporated community in Washington, US

- Unincorporated community
- Interactive map of Wickersham, Washington
- Coordinates: 48°39′18.40″N 122°12′46.57″W
- Country: United States
- State: Washington
- County: Whatcom

Government
  - Type: Unincorporated community
  - Body: Whatcom County
- Elevation: 335 ft (102 m)
- Time zone: UTC–8 (Pacific (PST))
  - Summer (DST): UTC–7 (PDT)
- Area codes: 360, 564
- GNIS feature ID: 1528113

Wickersham is an unincorporated community in south-western Whatcom County south of Acme along Washington State Route 9, just north of the border of Skagit County. Wickersham was a center of commerce in the South Fork Valley during the late 1800s and early 1900s, being between Park and the rest of the communities in the valley.

== History ==
The first settler in Wickersham was Noah V. Wickersham from Kansas, who arrived in Whatcom County in 1884. He sailed from Geneva to Park on Lake Whatcom in 1885, and was later joined by his brother, William. The town was named after the brothers.

In 1890, William Wickersham donated 40 acres (16 ha) to Virginia Land & Townsite Company for a railroad right-of-way. The Seattle, Lake Shore & Eastern Railway was built there, and in an agreement with William Wickersham, a station was built there, to be maintained for 20 years.

The Wickersham Post Office was established in 1891 with William Wickersham as its first postmaster, and operated until October 4, 1957. On the post office's application form the population in 1891 was listed at 100. William Wickersham was the first to open a general store in the town. The townsite was platted in April 1892 and put on the market.

Before they had their own school, children went to school in Acme, but in 1893 a school was built, just south of the county border in Skagit County. A larger two-room school was built in 1908, closer to the town, and in 1917 the building was expanded. The building ceased use in 1938 with the construction of the elementary school in Acme.

By 1901 the railway in Wickersham was connected west to Park. Wickersham, like many other communities in the area, had an economy mainly focused on logging and shingles, and the town's population waned as the lumber industry in the area did. Wickersham had two hotels, but both were burnt and not rebuilt.

Due to disagreements about rights-of-way in the 1980s, the start of the Lake Whatcom Railway, a recreational passenger steam train line, was moved to Wickersham.

== See also ==
- Park, Washington
- Acme, Washington
- List of unincorporated communities in Washington
