= Galbraith Mountain =

Mountain in Washington (state), United States

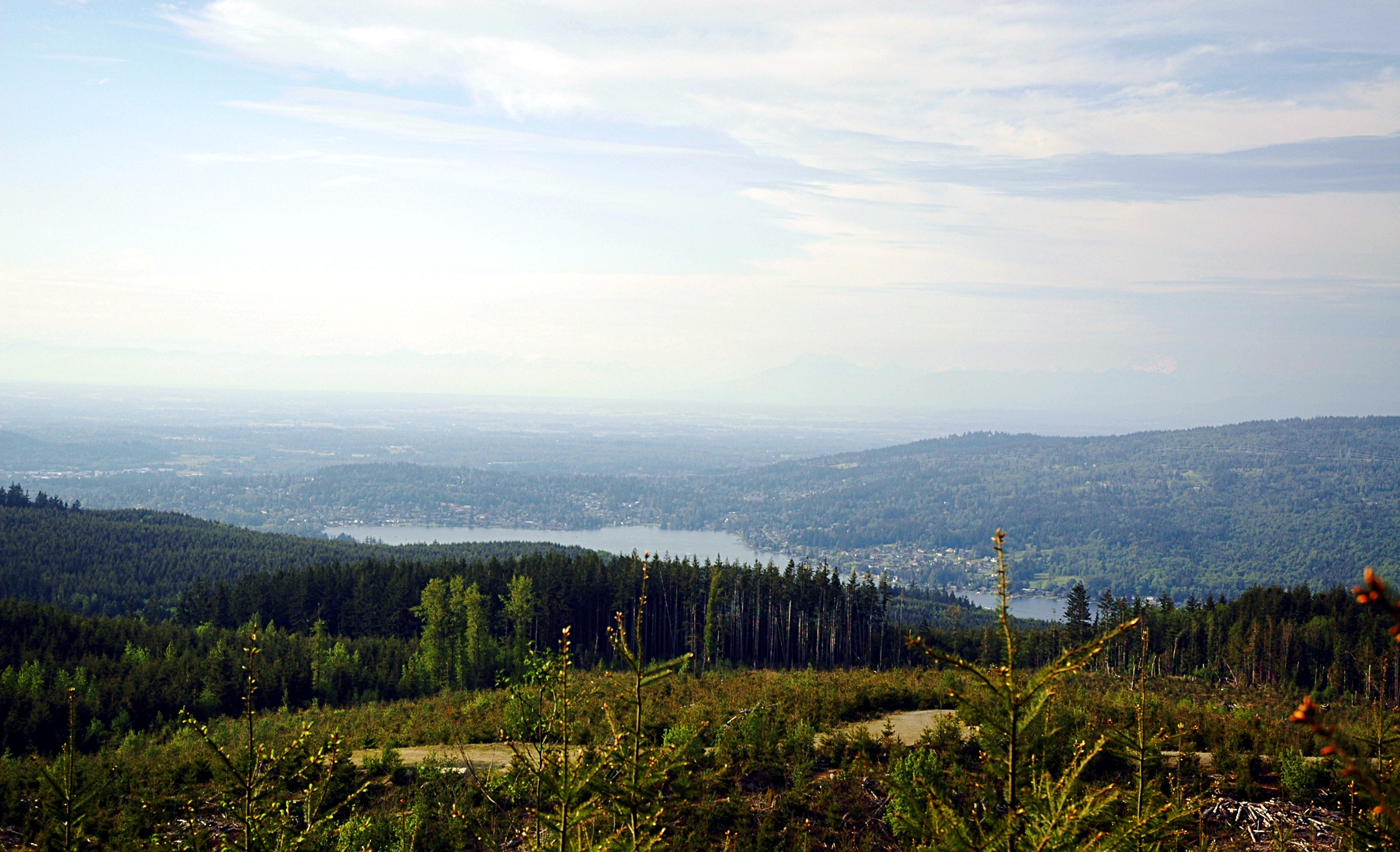
- View from Galbraith Mountain

Highest point
- Elevation: 1,785 ft (544 m)
- Coordinates: 48°42′29.6″N 122°23′34.6″W

Geography
- Location: Whatcom County, Washington, United States

Galbraith Mountain is the common name for North Lookout Mountain, located between the communities of Sudden Valley and Bellingham, Washington. It has been rated the best mountain bike trail system in the state of Washington. Galbraith Mountain is located between Lake Padden and Lake Whatcom.

Over 65 miles of singletrack winds through 3,000 acres overlooking the city of Bellingham and Bellingham Bay. The mountain is accessible to all non-motorized use; all of the trails are built and maintained by the WMBC.

== Property History ==
A 3,125-acre (12.65 km^{2}) area was owned by the Trillium Corporation until April 1, 2010, when the company surrendered the property to Polygon Financial Partners instead of defaulting on the loan held by Polygon. Galbraith Mountain has two main summits, which are 1,365 ft (416 m) and 1,785 ft (544 m) high. Though they are not either of the highest points on Lookout mountain, they are prominent from all over Western Whatcom County. The Whatcom Independent Mountain Pedalers (WHIMPs) created and maintained a large trail system under a 2005 contract with Trillium. The mountain has many access points; the two most popular are from Birch Street, off of Lakeway Drive, and Galbraith Lane, off of Samish Way.

Galbraith Mountain is home to four radio towers, three of which are on the summit, and one about 100 ft (30 m) below. There is active logging on the flanks of the mountain, which has opened clear sight lines from the trails which criss-cross the area. Numerous kiosks and outdoor art were placed throughout the mountain by Trillium and the WMBC, including a bike maintenance station.

In 2018, the city of Bellingham, Whatcom Land Trust, and Galbraith Tree Farm LLC entered into a purchase and sale agreement that secures the public's recreational use of up to 65 miles of trails on Galbraith Mountain. Bellingham City Council voted to approve the agreement, protecting the mountain from future development.
