= Park, Washington =

Ghost town in Washington (state)

- Ghost town
- Interactive map of Park, Washington
- Coordinates: 48°40′31″N 122°15′59″W
- Country: United States
- State: Washington
- County: Whatcom
- Established: 1884
- Time zone: UTC-8 (Pacific (PST))
  - Summer (DST): UTC-7 (PDT)
- GNIS feature ID: 1507296

Park is a ghost town in south-western Whatcom County, located at the south-eastern end of Lake Whatcom.

The town was established in 1884, and grew with the discovery of coal in Blue Canyon and with the growing logging industry in the area.

== History ==
Before white settlers arrived in the area, the south-eastern end of Lake Whatcom was a popular fishing camp, called Kaw-tchaa-ha-muk, used by Nooksack and Lummi people, who had a longhouse and a drying rack for fish there.

One of the first settlers in Park was Michael Anderson, a Norwegian-born Civil War veteran who moved from Minnesota, who established Anderson's Landing in 1883. By May 1884 Anderson was the route agent for the post office there. The original post office was named "Edmunds", but Anderson changed it to "Park" in honor of his friend, Charles M. Park, a homesteader in the area and former government surveyor.

The Park post office was established on August 14, 1884, with Anderson's son, Alexander A. Anderson, as its first postmaster. On its post office application in May 1884, the population was listed as 150, and a second application in July of the same year listed it at 200. The post office ran until 1892, when post was routed through Blue Canyon instead. Post in Park resumed in 1905, and ran until 1925 when post was moved to Wickersham.

Michael Anderson ran a general store and an inn in Park, serving people who had sailed down the lake from Geneva, which, at the time, was a popular way of getting to the South Fork Valley. Anderson had a warehouse in Geneva, where he stocked goods brought in from the nearby town of Whatcom. Anderson ferried goods, and sometimes incoming settlers, from Geneva to Park. Anderson charged 25 cents (equivalent to $9 in 2025) per passenger.

In February 1887, Anderson closed his store, presumably to pursue politics, as he became a member of the Washington State Second House of Representatives from 1891 to 1893. Two months later, a Swiss settler named Fred Zobrist started building a new store and inn at Park. Zobrist also had his own boat, which he used for ferrying as well.

A paddle steamer was moved from the Nooksack River into Lake Whatcom in 1890. The boat was named Edith, and had to be rolled from Bellingham Bay to the lake, which took 50 days. By 1892 there were several small steamers.

In September 1891, Zobrist got a permit to maintain a wharf for five years and charge rates on inbound freight. The wharf was located at the end of Road No. 64, which was a public highway at the time.

In 1893, Anderson returned to Park, and by April of that year he had a new shop open. He also opened up a lumber camp.

Work started in 1891 on Bellingham Bay and Eastern Railroad leading into Blue Canyon, as coal mining had started there a few years prior, and by 1901 the rails connected to the Seattle, Lake Shore and Eastern Railway in Wickersham. Park, being close to Blue Canyon, benefited from the discovery of coal there. The growing town and mines needed lumber, so logging camps were established in the area. As logging moved away from the lake, so did the population of Park and its importance in the area.

The nearest school had originally been in Blue Canyon, but due to waning population and low public funds, the school was moved to Park in 1906. Park consolidated with Acme in 1937, and later became part of the Mount Baker School District.

Park used to be the start of the Lake Whatcom Railway, a recreational passenger steam train line, but due to disagreements about rights-of-way in the 1980s, the start of the line was moved to Wickersham.

== See also ==
- Blue Canyon, Washington
- Wickersham, Washington
- List of ghost towns in Washington
