= Marietta-Alderwood, Washington =

- Neighborhood of Bellingham, Washington
- Location of Marietta-Alderwood, Washington
- Coordinates: 48°47′17″N 122°33′16″W
- Country: United States
- State: Washington
- County: Whatcom

Area
  - Total: 7.4 sq mi (19.2 km^{2})
  - Land: 6.0 sq mi (15.5 km^{2})
  - Water: 1.4 sq mi (3.7 km^{2})
- Elevation: 125 ft (38 m)

Population (2010)
  - Total: 3,906
  - Density: 602/sq mi (232.3/km^{2})
- Time zone: UTC-8 (Pacific (PST))
  - Summer (DST): UTC-7 (PDT)
- FIPS code: 53-43491
- GNIS feature ID: 2408178

Marietta-Alderwood is a census-designated place (CDP) in Whatcom County, Washington, United States. As of the 2020 census, Marietta-Alderwood had a population of 4,015. Parts of Marietta-Alderwood were annexed into Bellingham in 2019, while the rest remains an unincorporated area.

== Geography ==
According to the United States Census Bureau, the CDP has a total area of 7.4 square miles (19 km^{2}), of which, 6.0 square miles (16 km^{2}) of it is land and 1.5 square miles (3.9 km^{2}) of it (19.54%) is water.

=== Climate ===
This region experiences warm (but not hot) and dry summers, with no average monthly temperatures above 71.6 °F. According to the Köppen Climate Classification system, Marietta-Alderwood has a warm-summer Mediterranean climate, abbreviated "Csb" on climate maps.

Climate data for Marietta
Month	Jan	Feb	Mar	Apr	May	Jun	Jul	Aug	Sep	Oct	Nov	Dec	Year
Record high °F (°C)	66 (19)	68 (20)	78 (26)	83 (28)	86 (30)	101 (38)	99 (37)	98 (37)	91 (33)	83 (28)	67 (19)	67 (19)	112 (44)
Mean daily maximum °F (°C)	43.5 (6.4)	47.7 (8.7)	52.7 (11.5)	59.5 (15.3)	65.7 (18.7)	70.1 (21.2)	73.9 (23.3)	73.9 (23.3)	68.7 (20.4)	60.2 (15.7)	51.4 (10.8)	45.9 (7.7)	59.4 (15.2)
Mean daily minimum °F (°C)	30.5 (−0.8)	32.4 (0.2)	35.1 (1.7)	38.8 (3.8)	43.6 (6.4)	48.7 (9.3)	50.9 (10.5)	50.3 (10.2)	45.6 (7.6)	41 (5)	35.8 (2.1)	32.9 (0.5)	40.5 (4.7)
Record low °F (°C)	−1 (−18)	0 (−18)	11 (−12)	23 (−5)	26 (−3)	33 (1)	36 (2)	33 (1)	27 (−3)	22 (−6)	6 (−14)	6 (−14)	−1 (−18)
Average precipitation inches (mm)	4.24 (108)	2.98 (76)	2.95 (75)	2.1 (53)	1.49 (38)	1.55 (39)	0.9 (23)	0.94 (24)	1.86 (47)	3.4 (86)	4.3 (110)	4.81 (122)	31.53 (801)
Average snowfall inches (cm)	3.3 (8.4)	2.6 (6.6)	1.5 (3.8)	0.1 (0.25)	0 (0)	0 (0)	0 (0)	0 (0)	0 (0)	0 (0)	0.3 (0.76)	2.7 (6.9)	10.5 (27)
Average precipitation days	17	14	14	11	9	8	4	5	8	12	16	17	135

== Demographics ==
Historical population
Census	Pop.	Note	%±
1980	2,324		—
1990	2,766		19.0%
2000	3,594		29.9%
2020	4,015		—
U.S. Decennial Census; 1970 1980 1990; 2000 2010

As of the census of 2000, there were 3,594 people, 1,517 households, and 929 families residing in the CDP. The population density was 601.6 people per square mile (232.3 people/km^{2}). There were 1,606 housing units at an average density of 268.8 per square mile (103.8/km^{2}). The racial makeup of the CDP was 84.20% White, 1.11% African American, 3.84% Native American, 5.04% Asian, 0.39% Pacific Islander, 2.84% from other races, and 2.59% from two or more races. Hispanic or Latino of any race were 5.98% of the population.

There were 1,517 households, out of which 28.7% had children under the age of 18 living with them, 45.5% were married couples living together, 11.6% had a female householder with no husband present, and 38.7% were non-families. 27.4% of all households were made up of individuals, and 6.8% had someone living alone who was 65 years of age or older. The average household size was 2.37 and the average family size was 2.90.

In the CDP, the age distribution of the population shows 23.0% under the age of 18, 12.2% from 18 to 24, 30.2% from 25 to 44, 23.8% from 45 to 64, and 10.8% who were 65 years of age or older. The median age was 35 years. For every 100 females, there were 101.1 males. For every 100 females age 18 and over, there were 97.9 males.

The median income for a household in the CDP was $39,902, and the median income for a family was $43,194. Males had a median income of $35,875 versus $27,167 for females. The per capita income for the CDP was $21,322. About 11.3% of families and 15.6% of the population were below the poverty line, including 25.5% of those under age 18 and 8.2% of those age 65 or over.

== Education ==
Most of the community is in the Bellingham School District, while a portion is in the Ferndale School District.

Within the CDP, the Bellingham SD portion is zoned to Alderwood Elementary School, Shuksan Middle School, and Squalicum High School.
