= Blue Canyon, Washington =

Unincorporated community in Washington, US

- Unincorporated community
- Location within Washington (state)
- Coordinates: 48°40′56″N 122°16′39″W
- Country: United States
- State: Washington
- County: Whatcom
- Established: 1891

Area
  - Total: 74.8 acres (30.29 ha)
- Elevation: 338 ft (103 m)
- Time zone: UTC-8 (Pacific (PST))
  - Summer (DST): UTC-7 (PDT)
- Area code(s): 360, 564
- GNIS feature ID: 1510828

Blue Canyon is an unincorporated community in Whatcom County, in the U.S. state of Washington, located at the south-eastern end of Lake Whatcom.

The town grew with the discovery of coal at the Blue Canyon Mine, and waned as the coal ran out.

== History ==
=== Blue Canyon Mine ===
In 1883 a government surveyor, Oliver B. Iverson, recorded the existence of coal in the hills northwest of the nearby settlement of Park. Geologist Wayne S. Moen, with the Washington Department of Natural Resources Division of Mines and Geology, claims the seam was found in 1887.

Work on the mines began in November 1890, with James F. Wardner, an associate and business partner of Julius Bloedel. A firm was created, consisting of Wardner, Bloedel, and others, which Wardner sold his interest in the mines to. Bloedel became the secretary of the firm. Wardner was the one who named the mine and town, during an inspection of the property.

The first coal mined from Blue Canyon was transported in March 1891, and samples were left in several businesses. J. J. Donovan became the general superintendent for the mine, and by October 1891, about fifty short tons (45 t) of coal was being mined. Due to lower productivity than expected, the first mine shaft, about one-half mile (0.80 km) above the lake at an altitude of 1,122 feet (342 m), was abandoned in favor of a new shaft at a lower elevation about one-third mile (0.54 km) west.

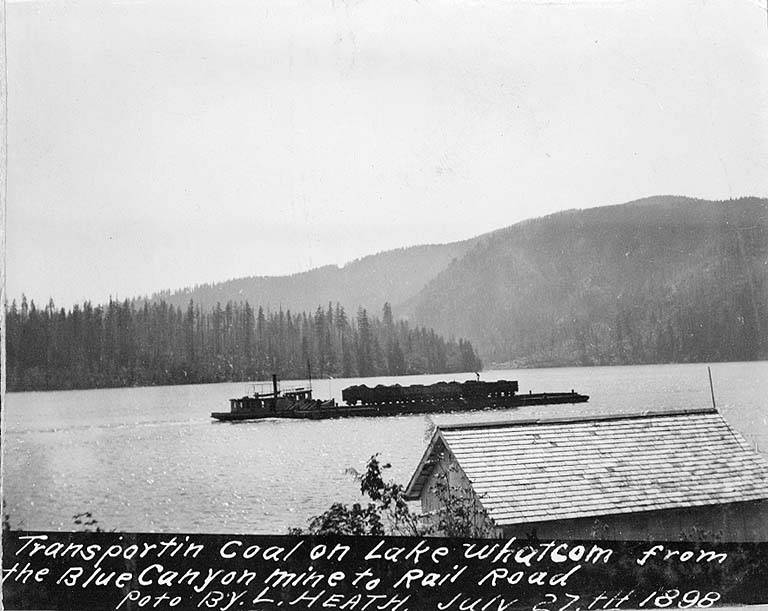
Coal from Blue Canyon Mine in railcars on a barge (1898)

To avoid loading coal in and out of a barge, on December 17, 1891, a new railroad company was incorporated, with Edward Eldridge as president, and Donovan as secretary-treasurer, securing trackage rights in Fairhaven, and building a terminal at Silver Beach. On May 18, 1892, the Fairhaven Herald reported that new tracks were being built, connecting to existing tracks that came near the lake. Coal was being shipped via rail instead of barge by July 1892.

On April 4, 1893, the Fairhaven Herald reported on a new seam of coal being discovered, 1,000 feet (300 m) east of the previous tunnel. They reported 200 short tons (180 t) daily, and expected that to increase. The company at this time had contracts with firms in San Francisco for 4,000 short tons (3,600 t) a month.

Blue Canyon coal was submitted to Benjamin F. Tracy, the Secretary of the Navy at the time, and on April 27, 1894, a contract was secured to fuel the Bering Sea Squadron. The coal was said by the Navy to be the best on the Pacific coast.

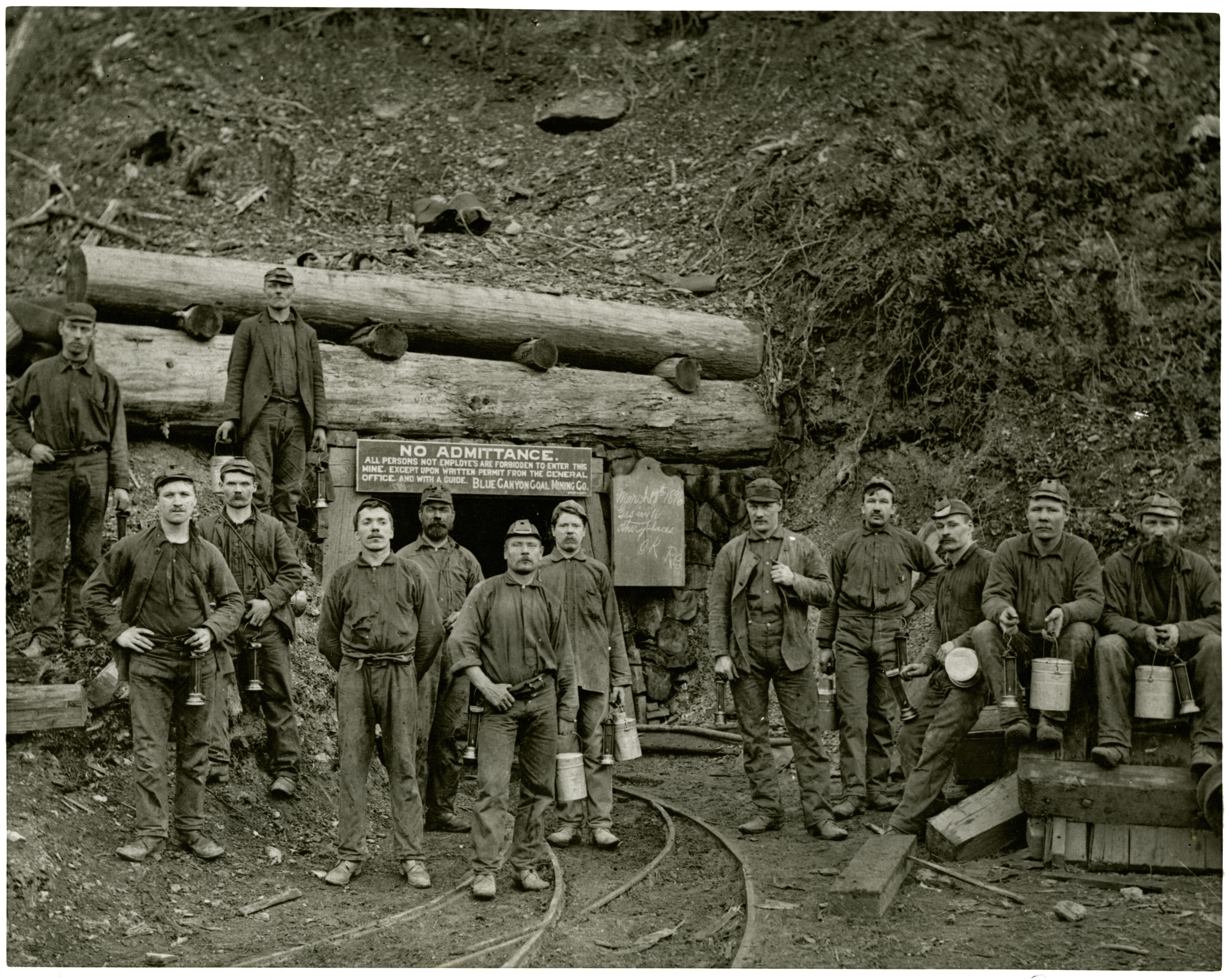
Thirteen miners stand in front of the entrance to Blue Canyon Mine (1896)

An explosion occurred in the mine in April 1895, killing 23 miners, including the superintendent at the time, making it the worst mine disaster in Washington at the time. A memorial in the Bayview Cemetery in Bellingham now commemorates those who died.

Due to the a recession and to the Navy switching to oil as fuel, starting in 1898 the mines started to decrease in productivity. The mine produced 8,200 short tons (7,400 t) in 1901, 6,010 short tons (5,450 t) in 1902, and briefly ceased operation in 1903, causing some miners and investors to move away from the mine. The amount of coal taken from the mines total was later reported by the U.S. Bureau of Mines to have been 280,000 short tons (250,000 t).

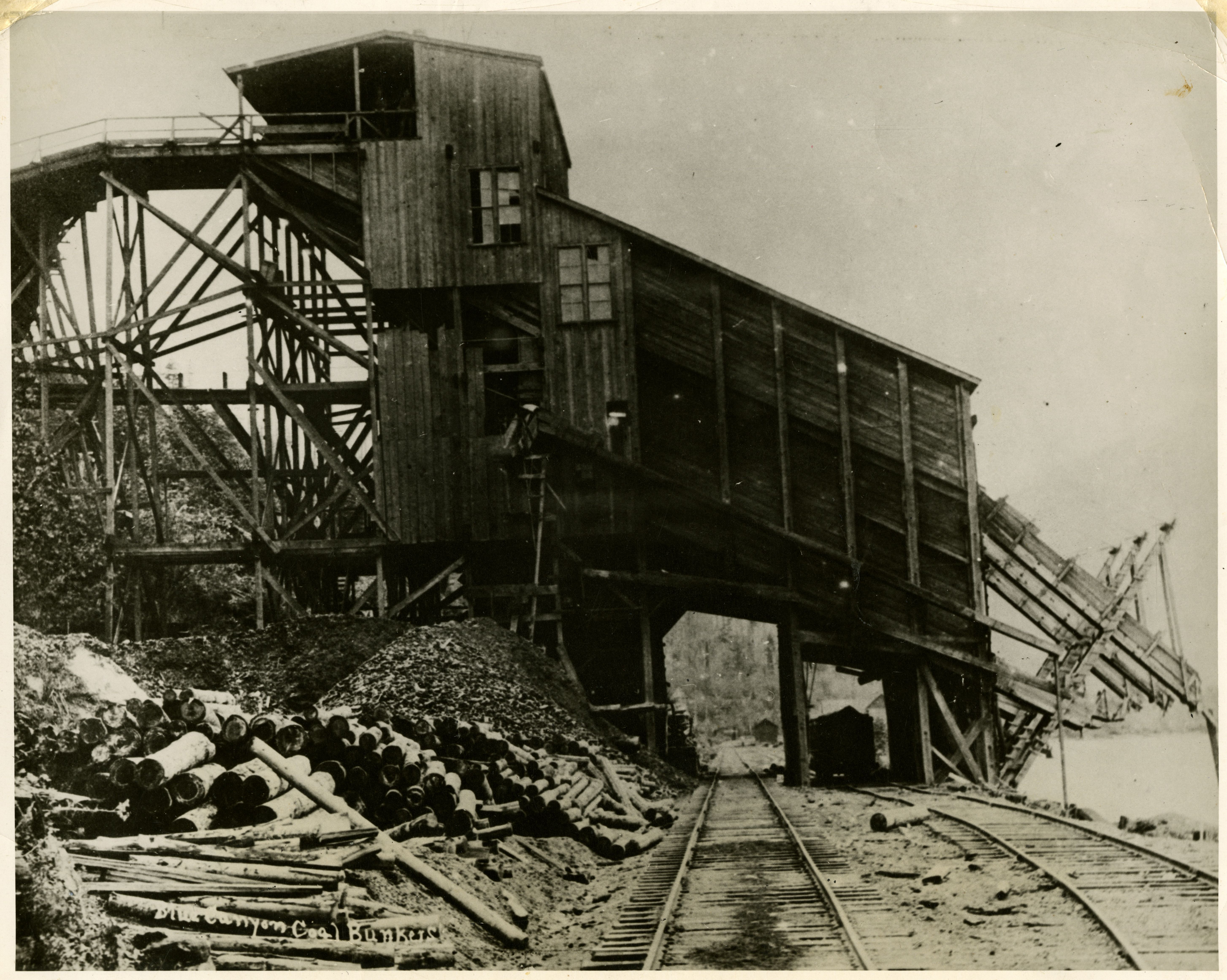
Coal bunker at Blue Canyon Mine (1905)

Starting in 1904 the mines switched hands a few times, before, in 1907, a company was organized, Whatcom County Mining Company, which ran the mine for 12 more years before closing in 1919 when the coal seam ran out and interest in the Bellingham Coal Company was higher. Other seams existed in the area, but the company leadership wanted to move on. During these years only 50–75 short tons (45–68 t) were mined per day, with a majority of the coal mined from Blue Canyon being sent to Seattle Gas Works. In 1920 a fire burnt coal bunkers and other structures near the tracks.

=== Blue Canyon townsite ===
In January 1891, Bloedel bought 74.85 acres (30.29 ha) from Fred Zobrist of Park for $9,000 (equivalent to $322,500 in 2025), and created the Blue Canyon Townsite Corporation. Zobrist had originally bought 166.35 acres (67.32 ha) in August 1889, for $1,000 (equivalent to $35,833 in 2025). Blue Canyon City was incorporated on May 4, 1891, with plans laid out for 417 lots.

A post office called Blue Canyon was established on July 25, 1892, and remained in operation until August 17, 1905, with Jacob D. Custer as the postmaster throughout its operation. The building which housed the post office used to be a saloon, before it was shut down by the mine's superintendent.

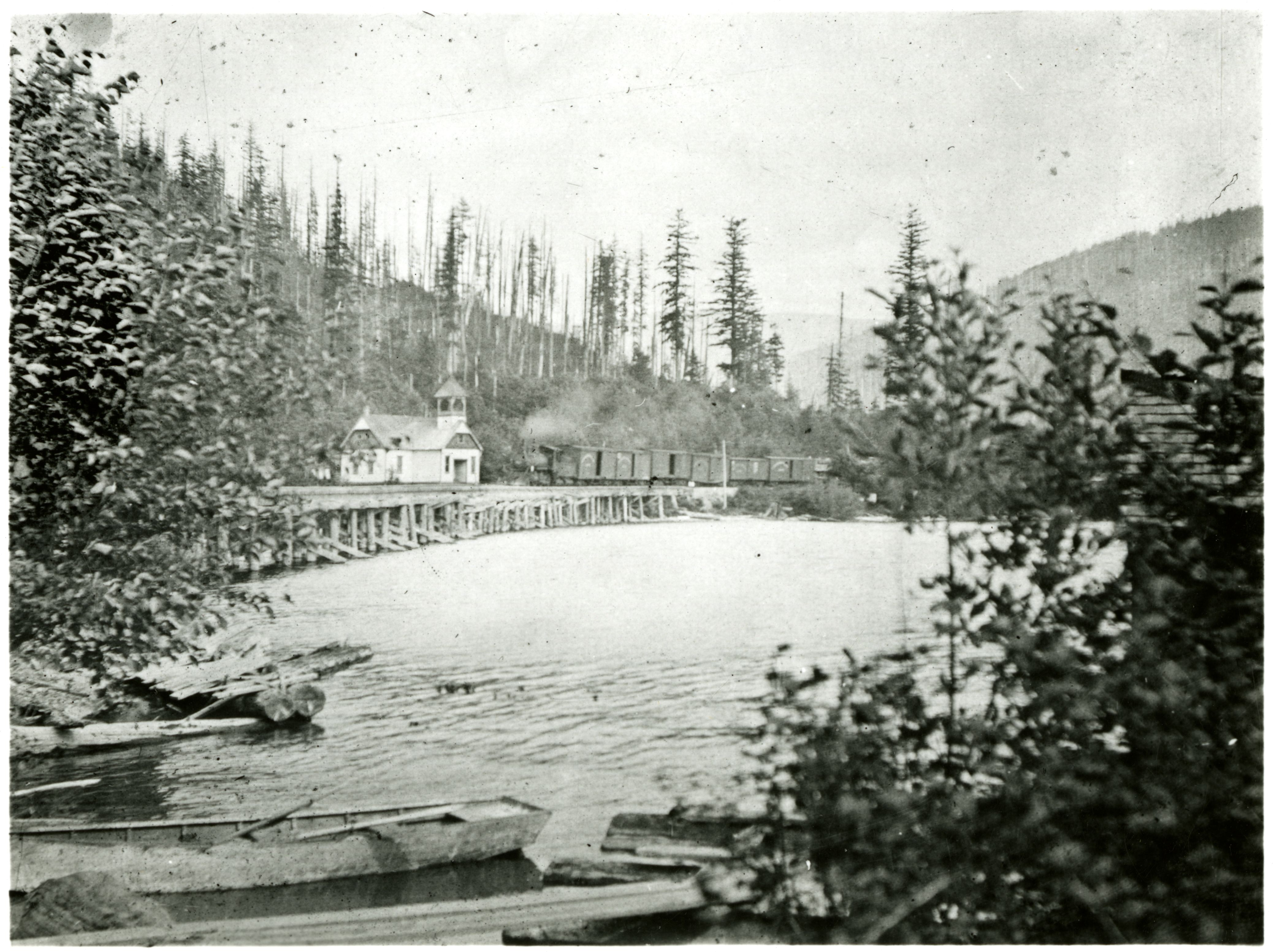
Blue Canyon School (date unknown)

The first school in Blue Canyon was built in 1892, known colloquially as the "Denmark School", as all the students were Danes. Later, in 1900, an acre (0.40 ha) was secured for a new school, in a better location, with a teacherage on site. Blue Canyon consolidated with Acme's school district in 1937.

A Masonic lodge was established in Blue Canyon in 1893, and once monthly members made trips to Silver Beach.

By 1895, about 1,000 people lived in Blue Canyon.

In 1901 the Bellingham Bay and Eastern railroad was extended to Wickersham, and many buildings and homes were moved to Park to make way. Other buildings were burnt or torn down and not rebuilt.
