= Whatcom County, Washington =

County in Washington, United States

- County
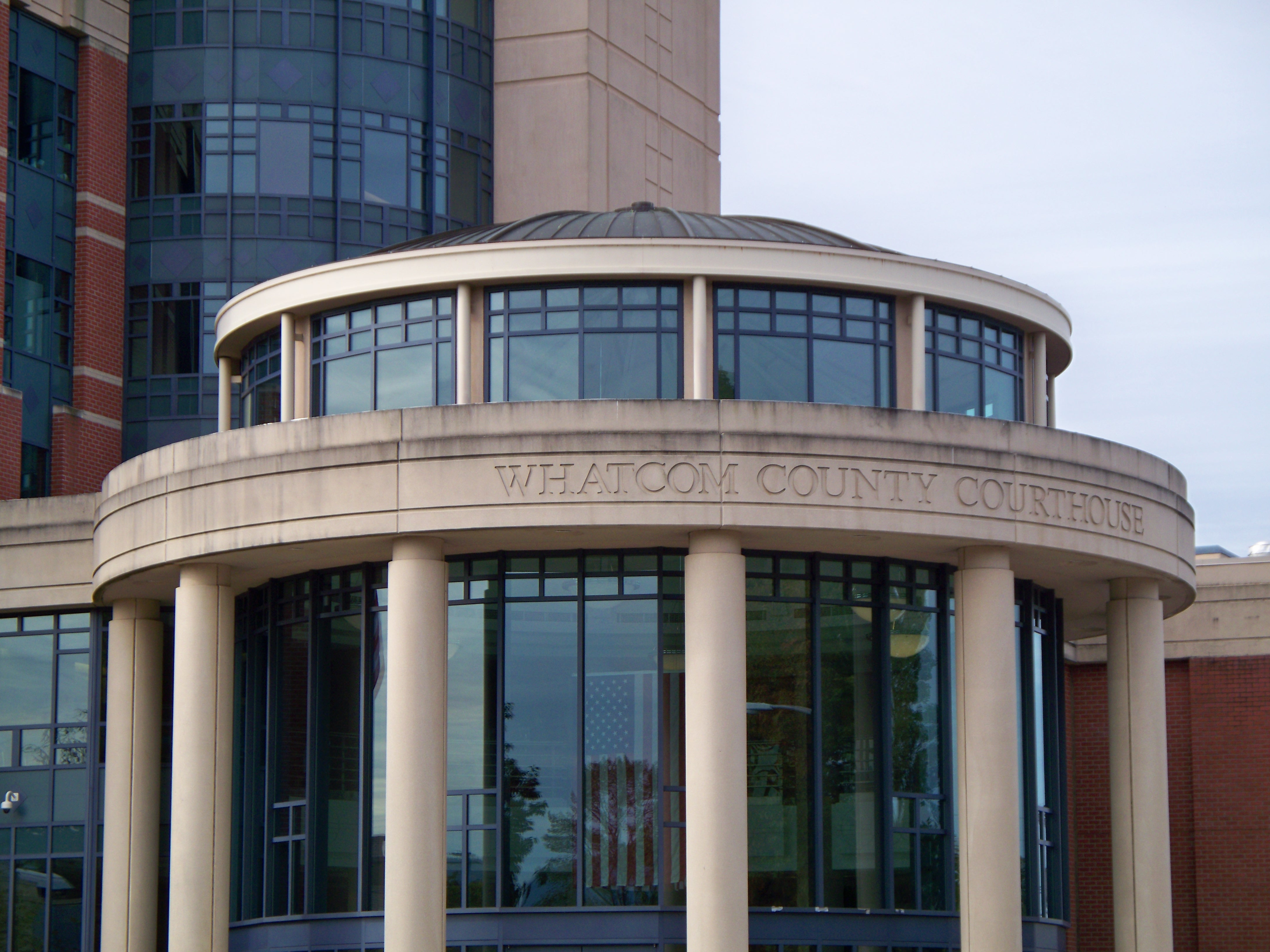
- Whatcom County Courthouse in Bellingham

- Seal

- Location within the U.S. state of Washington
- Coordinates: 48°50′34″N 121°50′11″W
- Country: United States
- State: Washington
- Founded: March 9, 1854
- Named for: Chief Whatcom
- Seat: Bellingham
- Largest city: Bellingham

Area
  - Total: 2,503 sq mi (6,480 km^{2})
  - Land: 2,107 sq mi (5,460 km^{2})
  - Water: 397 sq mi (1,030 km^{2}) 16%

Population (2020)
  - Total: 226,847
  - Estimate (2025): 236,392 ▲
  - Density: 103/sq mi (40/km^{2})
- Time zone: UTC−8 (Pacific)
  - Summer (DST): UTC−7 (PDT)
- Congressional district: 2nd
- Website: www.whatcomcounty.us

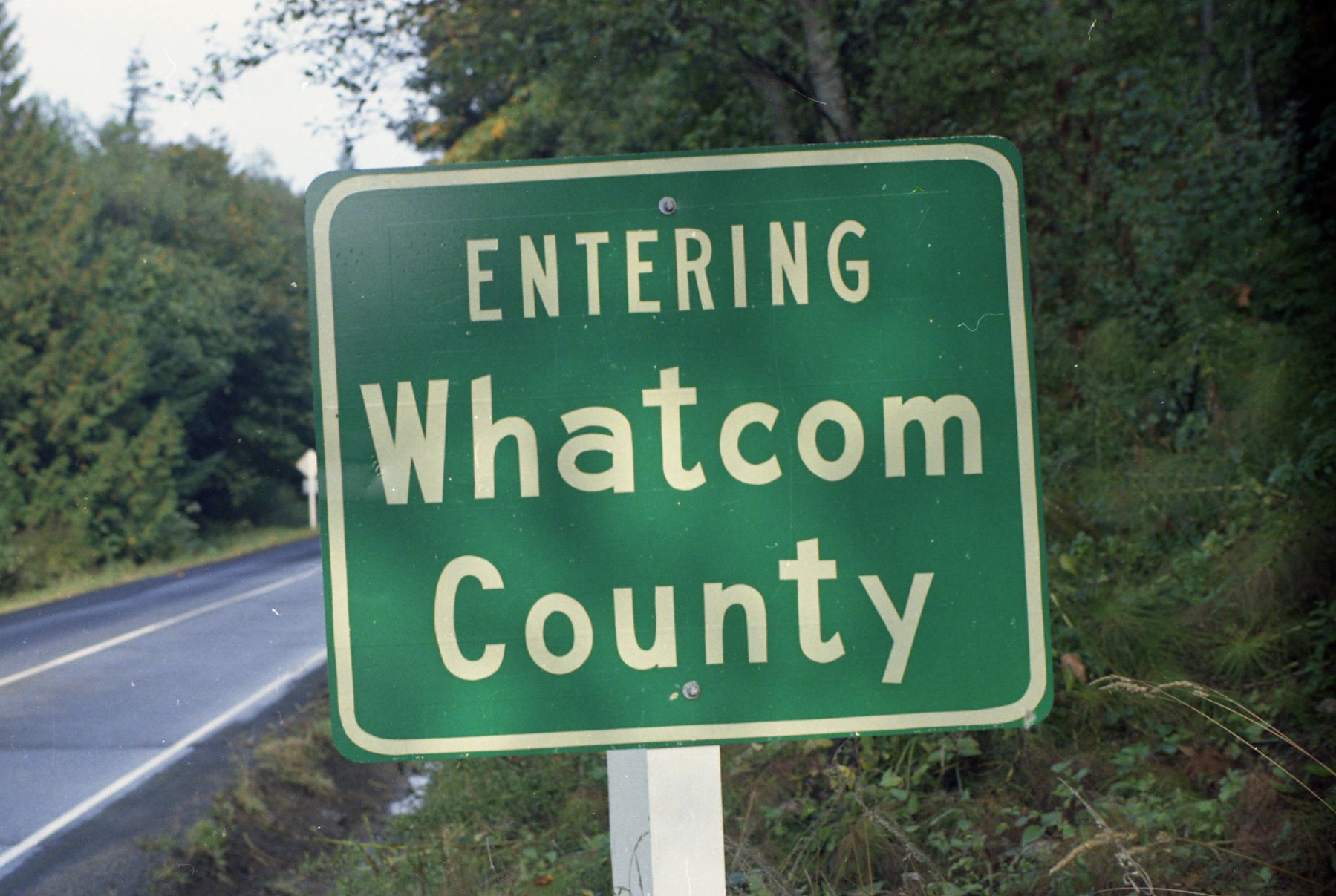
Sign at county boundary, 1970

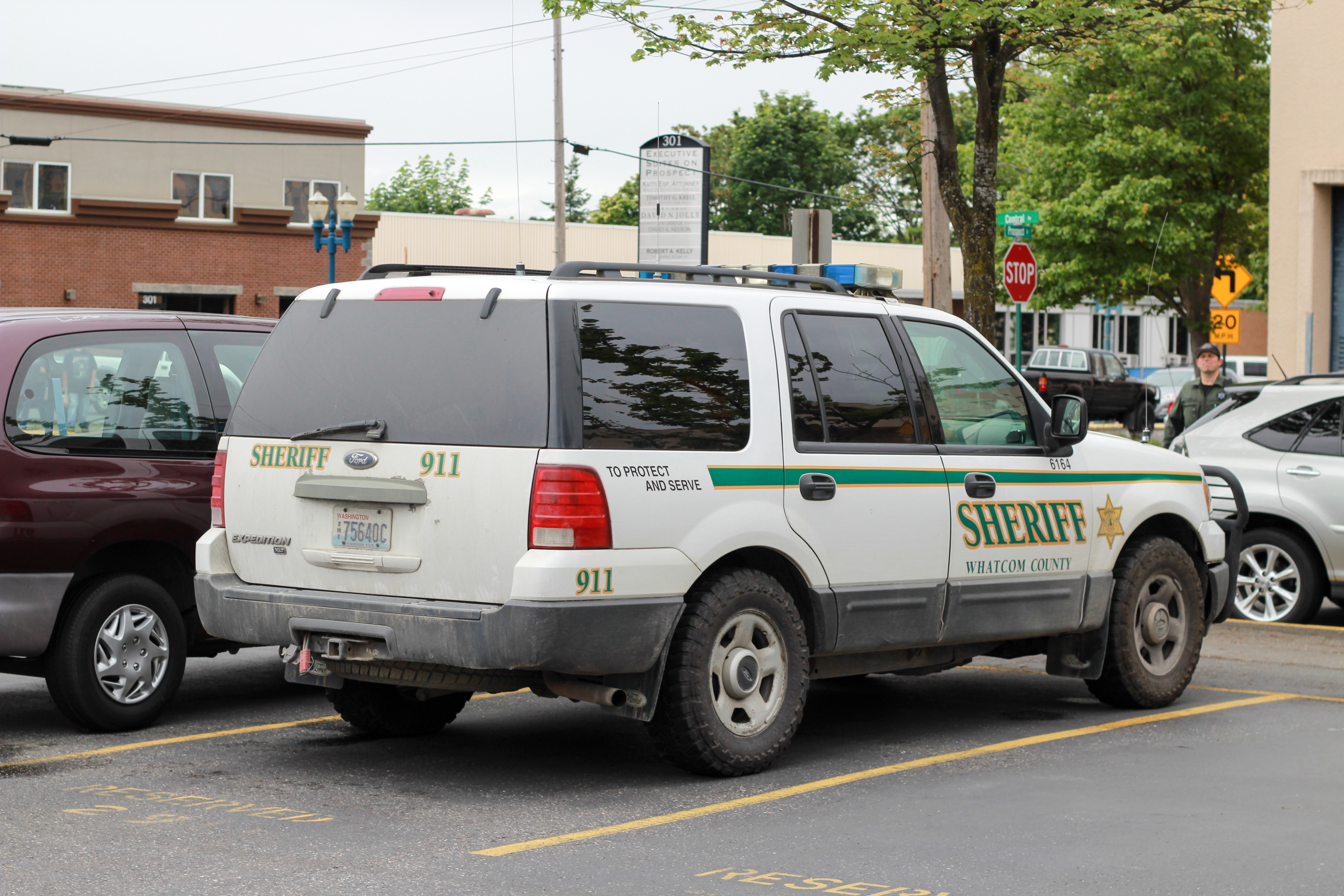
Sheriff's Department vehicle in Bellingham

Whatcom County (/ˈwɒtkəm/, /ˈhwɒtkəm/) is a county located in the northwestern corner of the U.S. state of Washington, bordered by the Lower Mainland (the Metro Vancouver and Fraser Valley Regional Districts) of the Canadian province of British Columbia to the north, Okanogan County to the east, Skagit County to the south, San Juan County across Rosario Strait to the southwest, and the Strait of Georgia to the west. Its county seat and largest population center is the coastal city of Bellingham. Whatcom County is coterminous with the Bellingham Metropolitan Statistical Area. As of the 2020 census, the county's population was 226,847.

The county was created from Island County by the Washington Territorial Legislature in March 1854. It originally included the territory of present-day San Juan and Skagit counties, which were later independently organized after additional settlement. Its name derives from the Lummi word Xwotʼqom, also spelled [x̣ʷátqʷəm], perhaps meaning 'noisy' or 'noisy water' and referring to a waterfall. Whatcom County has a diversified economy with a significant agricultural base, including approximately 60% of the nation's annual production of raspberries.

== History ==
The Whatcom County area has had known human habitation for at least twelve millennia. At least three aboriginal tribes have been identified in the area: Lummi (San Juan Islands, between Point Whitehorn and Chuckanut Bay), Nooksack (between Lynden and Maple Falls) and Semiahmoo (the northern portion, near Blaine).

This area was part of the Oregon Country at the start of the nineteenth century, inhabited both by fur prospectors from Canada and Americans seeking land for agricultural and mineral-extraction opportunities. Unable to resolve which country should control this vast area, the Treaty of 1818 provided for joint control. In 1827 the Hudson's Bay Company established Fort Langley near present Lynden.

By 1843, the Provisional Government of Oregon had been established, although at first there were questions as to its authority and extent. During its existence, that provisional government formed the area north of the Columbia River first into the Washington Territory, and then (December 19, 1845) into two vast counties: Clark and Lewis. In 1852, a portion of Lewis County was partitioned off to form Thurston County, and in 1853 a portion of the new county was partitioned off to form Island County.

The Washington Territory was formed as a separate governing entity in 1853. In 1854, that legislature carved several counties out of the existing counties, including Whatcom County on March 9, 1854, with area taken from Island County. The original county boundary was reduced in 1873 by the formation of San Juan County, and again in 1883 by the formation of Skagit County.

In 1855 the settlers erected a blockhouse west of Whatcom Creek, to protect against forays from the aboriginal inhabitants who were attempting to defend their homelands. That year the Treaty of Point Elliott was signed, which assigned the Lummi and Semiahmoo peoples a greatly-restricted reserved area.

The short-lived Fraser Canyon Gold Rush (1857–58) caused a short-term increase in the county's population, which briefly swelled to over 10,000 before the bubble burst.

In 1857 the federal government began the field work necessary to establish the national border between the United States and Canada, which had been agreed on as the forty-ninth parallel in this area, and which would also mark the north line of Whatcom County. As the work moved east, several of the workers chose to remain in the area as settlers.

== Border crossings ==
Whatcom County's northern border is the Canada–US border with the Canadian province of British Columbia. Adjoining the county on the north (from west to east) are the Metro Vancouver suburbs of Delta, Surrey, Langley, the central Fraser Valley city of Abbotsford and the rural Fraser Valley Regional District.

The border crossing points are (from west to east):

- the Point Roberts Tyee Dr to Tsawwassen, a neighborhood in Delta, British Columbia
- the Peace Arch Border Crossing, where Interstate 5 meets British Columbia Highway 99
- the Pacific Highway Border Crossing connecting State Route 543 with British Columbia Highway 15, between Blaine and Surrey
- the Lynden–Aldergrove Border Crossing, where SR 539 connects to British Columbia Highway 13
- the Sumas–Huntingdon Border Crossing at Sumas, Washington (SR 9 connecting to Abbotsford, British Columbia)
- An additional unmanned legal crossing connects British Columbia's Skagit Valley Provincial Park to North Cascades National Park in Washington.

Several shopping malls and other services in Bellingham and elsewhere in the county are geared to cross-border shopping and recreation.

== Geography ==
According to the United States Census Bureau, the county has a total area of 2,503 square miles (6,480 km^{2}), of which 2,107 square miles (5,460 km^{2}) is land and 397 square miles (1,030 km^{2}), or 16%, is covered by water.

Western Whatcom County is part of the Fraser Lowland, the plain of the Fraser River, most of which is in the Lower Mainland of British Columbia. At some periods in the past, one of the Fraser River's distributaries may have entered Bellingham Bay near Bellingham at or near the modern-day mouth of the Nooksack River.

The remainder of Whatcom County is in the Cascade Range, including Mount Baker. In their foothills is Lake Whatcom, which is drained by Whatcom Creek into Bellingham Bay.

A small part of the county, Point Roberts, about 5 square miles (13 km^{2}), is an extension of the Tsawwassen Peninsula, which is bisected by the Canada–US border along the 49th parallel. The highest point in the county is the peak of the active volcano Mount Baker at 10,778 feet (3,285 m) above sea level. The lowest points are at sea level along the Salish Sea, an arm of the Pacific Ocean.

=== Geographic features ===
- Bellingham Bay
- Birch Bay
- Cascade Mountains
  - Chuckanut Mountains
  - Mount Baker, highest point in Whatcom County
  - American Border Peak
  - Sumas Mountain
  - Mount Shuksan
- Chilliwack River/Chilliwack Lake
- Eliza Island
- Lake Whatcom
- Lummi Island
- Lummi Bay
- Nooksack River
- North Lookout Mountain, known locally as Galbraith Mountain
- Portage Island
- Semiahmoo Bay
  - Semiahmoo Spit
- Skagit River/Ross Lake
- Sumas River

=== National protected areas ===
- Mount Baker National Recreation Area
- Mount Baker–Snoqualmie National Forest (part)
- North Cascades National Park (part)
- Ross Lake National Recreation Area (part)
- Pacific Northwest National Scenic Trail (part)

=== State protected areas ===
- Birch Bay State Park
- Lake Terrell Wildlife Refuge
- Larrabee State Park
- Lookout Mountain (DNR)
- Lummi Island (part) (DNR)
- Stewart Mountain (DNR)
- Lake Whatcom Watershed

=== Major highways ===
- Interstate 5 connecting with Seattle, Portland, Sacramento, Los Angeles, San Diego and points south.
- SR 20 connecting US 101 and Sidney, British Columbia with Newport, Washington via the North Cascades Highway. Farthest north highway thru the Cascade Mountains in USA. Note that this highway does not connect to most of Whatcom County – Instead, a person would have to travel south to Sedro-Woolley in Skagit County to connect to Highway 20.
- Alaska Marine Highway connecting Alaska highways to the Interstate Highway System.

=== Adjacent counties ===
- Metro Vancouver Regional District, British Columbia – north
- Fraser Valley Regional District, British Columbia – northeast
- Cowichan Valley Regional District, British Columbia – west
- Capital Regional District, British Columbia – west
- Okanogan County – east
- San Juan County – southwest
- Skagit County – south

== Demographics ==
Historical population
Census	Pop.	Note	%±
1860	352		—
1870	534		51.7%
1880	3,137		487.5%
1890	18,591		492.6%
1900	24,116		29.7%
1910	49,511		105.3%
1920	50,600		2.2%
1930	59,128		16.9%
1940	60,355		2.1%
1950	66,733		10.6%
1960	70,317		5.4%
1970	81,950		16.5%
1980	106,701		30.2%
1990	127,780		19.8%
2000	166,814		30.5%
2010	201,140		20.6%
2020	226,847		12.8%
2025 (est.)	236,392	▲	4.2%
U.S. Decennial Census; 1790–1960 1900–1990; 1990–2000 2010–2020

=== 2020 census ===
As of the 2020 census, the county had a population of 226,847. Of the residents, 19.6% were under the age of 18, 18.6% were 65 years of age or older, and the median age was 38.2 years. For every 100 females there were 96.6 males and for every 100 females age 18 and over there were 94.7 males. 71.4% of residents lived in urban areas and 28.6% lived in rural areas.

Whatcom County, Washington – Racial and ethnic composition Note: the US Census treats Hispanic/Latino as an ethnic category. This table excludes Latinos from the racial categories and assigns them to a separate category. Hispanics/Latinos may be of any race.
Race / Ethnicity (NH = Non-Hispanic)	Pop 2000	Pop 2010	Pop 2020	% 2000	% 2010	% 2020
White alone (NH)	143,842	164,675	170,385	86.23%	81.87%	75.11%
Black or African American alone (NH)	1,065	1,789	2,221	0.64%	0.89%	0.98%
Native American or Alaska Native alone (NH)	4,396	5,070	5,459	2.64%	2.52%	2.41%
Asian alone (NH)	4,598	6,988	9,952	2.76%	3.47%	4.39%
Pacific Islander alone (NH)	223	459	672	0.13%	0.23%	0.30%
Other race alone (NH)	349	365	1,338	0.21%	0.18%	0.59%
Mixed race or Multiracial (NH)	3,654	6,038	13,995	2.19%	3.00%	6.17%
Hispanic or Latino (any race)	8,687	15,756	22,825	5.21%	7.83%	10.06%
Total	166,814	201,140	226,847	100.00%	100.00%	100.00%

The racial makeup of the county was 77.6% White, 1.0% Black or African American, 2.8% American Indian and Alaska Native, 4.5% Asian, 0.3% Native Hawaiian and Pacific Islander, 4.3% from some other race, and 9.6% from two or more races. Hispanic or Latino residents of any race comprised 10.1% of the population. There were 90,123 households in the county, of which 26.0% had children under the age of 18 living with them and 25.9% had a female householder with no spouse or partner present. About 27.8% of all households were made up of individuals and 12.0% had someone living alone who was 65 years of age or older. There were 100,064 housing units, of which 9.9% were vacant. Among occupied housing units, 61.7% were owner-occupied and 38.3% were renter-occupied. The homeowner vacancy rate was 1.1% and the rental vacancy rate was 3.5%.

=== 2010 census ===
As of the 2010 census, there were 201,140 people, 80,370 households, and 48,862 families resided in the county. The population density was 95.5 people per square mile (36.9 people/km^{2}). The 90,665 housing units averaged 43.0 units per square mile (16.6 units/km^{2}). The racial makeup of the county was 85.4% White, 3.5% Asian, 2.8% American Indian, 1.0% Black or African American, 0.2% Pacific Islander, 3.3% from other races, and 3.8% from two or more races. Those of Hispanic or Latino origin made up 7.8% of the population. In terms of ancestry, 20.8% were German, 12.8% were Irish, 12.6% were English, 8.0% were Dutch, 6.9% were Norwegian, and 4.4% were American.

Of the 80,370 households, 28.0% had children under the age of 18 living with them, 48.0% were married couples living together, 8.8% had a female householder with no husband present, 39.2% were not families, and 27.8% of all households were made up of individuals. The average household size was 2.43, and the average family size was 2.97. The median age was 36.6 years.

The median income for a household in the county was $49,031 and for a family was $64,586. Males had a median income of $47,109 versus $34,690 for females. The per capita income for the county was $25,407. About 7.8% of families and 15.0% of the population were below the poverty line, including 14.9% of those under age 18 and 7.1% of those age 65 or over.

=== 2000 census ===
As of the 2000 census, there were 166,814 people, 64,446 households, and 41,116 families resided in the county. The population density was 79 people per square mile (31 people/km^{2}). The 73,893 housing units averaged 35 units per square mile (14 units/km^{2}). The racial makeup of the county was 88.41% White, 0.69% Black or African American, 2.82% Native American, 2.78% Asian, 0.14% Pacific Islander, 2.49% from other races, and 2.66% from two or more races. About 5.21% of the population was Hispanic or Latino of any race. Of people of European ancestry, 15.5% identified as German, 9.2% as English, 8.2% as Dutch, 7.9% as Irish, 7.0% as Norwegian, and 6.6% as United States or American ancestry.

Of the 64,446 households, 30.40% had children under the age of 18 living with them, 51.20% were married couples living together, 8.80% had a female householder with no husband present, and 36.20% were not families. About 25.60% of all households were made up of individuals, and 8.40% had someone living alone who was 65 years of age or older. The average household size was 2.51 and the average family size was 3.03.

In the county, the population was distributed as 24.10% under the age of 18, 14.20% from 18 to 24, 27.50% from 25 to 44, 22.50% from 45 to 64, and 11.60% who were 65 years of age or older. The median age was 34 years. For every 100 females, there were 97.10 males. For every 100 females age 18 and over, there were 95.00 males.

The median income for a household in the county was $40,005, and for a family was $49,325. Males had a median income of $37,589 versus $26,193 for females. The per capita income for the county was $20,025. About 7.80% of families and 14.20% of the population were below the poverty line, including 14.20% of those under age 18 and 8.30% of those age 65 or over.

== Government ==
The Whatcom County government is a county corporation operating under a charter approved in 1978; it functions as a county constitution. Whatcom County is one of seven Washington counties to use the home rule charter provision of state law. Local government is split between the county, incorporated cities and towns, and special-purpose districts. These local governments are established and operate according to state law, and operate independently from the county government.

=== County government ===
The charter establishes the structure of Whatcom County government. The Whatcom County Council holds legislative powers granted to counties. The council consists of seven members elected for a term of four years. Council members are elected at the general election in November of odd-numbered years. Three council members are elected one year before a presidential election; four council members are elected one year after a presidential election. One member is elected from each of the five districts; two members are elected at-large, which favors candidates who can command a majority of voters. The county council also serves as the county board of health.

The executive branch consists of six elected officials, a county executive, and five department heads. The county executive is similar to a mayor or governor. The assessor, auditor, prosecuting attorney, sheriff, and treasurer are elected independently from the county executive and council. These six officials serve four-year terms. The county council establishes various departments by ordinance. The county council or county executive appoint department heads. These departments include administrative services, health, medical examiner, planning and development services, parks and recreation, and public works.

The judicial branch consists of a district court and superior court. The district court is a court of limited jurisdiction that handles civil and criminal cases. Criminal cases are limited to adults charged with misdemeanor or gross misdemeanor offenses. State law specifies what cases are in the district court's jurisdiction. The district court operates a small claims court to resolve civil cases involving monetary damages not exceeding $5,000. No attorneys are permitted to appear in small claims court. Cases are heard using less formal procedures. The district court has two judges, a court commissioner, and a support staff.

The superior court is a court of general jurisdiction. Superior court hears civil cases exceeding $75,000 or requesting non-monetary remedies. Superior court hears all juvenile criminal cases and all adult felony cases. Superior court also hears appeals from district court and municipal courts. Superior court staff include three judges, three full-time court commissioners, two part-time court commissioners, and support staff. District and superior court judges are elected by the county voters for a term of four years. Court commissioners are appointed by elected judges; commissioners have powers and responsibilities equal to elected judges.

=== Politics ===
Whatcom County has been largely Democratic in presidential elections since 1988. Since 2004, the Democratic presidential candidates have received the majority of the county's vote. In the 2020 election, Joe Biden handily won the county with just over 60% of the vote, as did Kamala Harris four years later.

United States presidential election results for Whatcom County, Washington
Year	Republican		Democratic		Third party(ies)	
Year	No.	%	No.	%	No.	%
1892	1,709	41.50%	1,161	28.19%	1,248	30.31%
1896	1,971	46.16%	2,227	52.15%	72	1.69%
1900	2,952	56.62%	1,700	32.60%	562	10.78%
1904	5,410	70.41%	1,174	15.28%	1,100	14.32%
1908	4,955	57.48%	2,398	27.82%	1,268	14.71%
1912	4,187	27.90%	2,773	18.48%	8,045	53.62%
1916	7,632	48.18%	5,629	35.53%	2,581	16.29%
1920	9,157	57.52%	2,288	14.37%	4,475	28.11%
1924	9,214	57.19%	927	5.75%	5,969	37.05%
1928	14,621	76.87%	4,100	21.56%	300	1.58%
1932	9,254	41.11%	11,355	50.44%	1,902	8.45%
1936	9,035	35.08%	15,428	59.90%	1,293	5.02%
1940	13,351	46.30%	14,877	51.60%	606	2.10%
1944	12,890	45.88%	14,787	52.63%	421	1.50%
1948	12,850	46.81%	12,736	46.40%	1,865	6.79%
1952	17,590	57.06%	12,877	41.77%	361	1.17%
1956	17,414	54.10%	14,533	45.15%	244	0.76%
1960	16,651	52.82%	14,298	45.35%	577	1.83%
1964	10,900	34.69%	20,297	64.59%	225	0.72%
1968	14,695	47.10%	14,003	44.88%	2,501	8.02%
1972	22,585	58.21%	15,027	38.73%	1,189	3.06%
1976	20,007	48.00%	19,739	47.36%	1,933	4.64%
1980	21,371	46.40%	18,430	40.02%	6,256	13.58%
1984	27,228	53.72%	22,670	44.73%	788	1.55%
1988	23,820	47.55%	25,571	51.05%	703	1.40%
1992	23,801	37.38%	26,619	41.80%	13,259	20.82%
1996	27,153	42.09%	29,074	45.07%	8,283	12.84%
2000	34,287	46.49%	34,033	46.14%	5,437	7.37%
2004	40,296	44.58%	48,268	53.40%	1,830	2.02%
2008	40,205	40.07%	58,236	58.04%	1,898	1.89%
2012	42,703	41.45%	57,089	55.41%	3,237	3.14%
2016	40,599	35.82%	60,340	53.24%	12,400	10.94%
2020	50,489	36.42%	83,660	60.35%	4,471	3.23%
2024	49,213	35.70%	83,295	60.42%	5,360	3.89%

=== Special-purpose districts ===
Special-purpose districts include cemetery, fire, hospital, library, school, and water and sewer districts. Each special district is governed by officials elected by voters within that jurisdiction.

The lone public hospital district in the county serves Point Roberts, while Skagit County's district extends into some areas of eastern Whatcom County. An expanded public hospital district that covers most of the county is proposed for a 2027 ballot measure.

==== Fire districts ====
Eleven fire districts, two city fire departments, and a regional fire authority provide fire prevention, fire fighting, and emergency medical services. Each fire district is governed by an elected board of commissioners. Most districts have three commissioners. Fire districts receive most of their revenue from property taxes. All of the fire districts and the regional fire authority have volunteer or paid-call firefighters and emergency medical technicians (EMTs), as does the City of Lynden Fire Department.

The City of Bellingham is an all-career department. Some of the districts also have full-time firefighter/EMTs. All fire districts use 9-1-1 for emergency calls. Whatcom County has one 9-1-1 call center located in Bellingham. Fire/EMS calls are processed and dispatched at a second public safety answering point called Prospect, located at a fire station in Bellingham. Additional dispatching locations provide backup capacity to answer emergency calls.

Whatcom County Fire Districts are:

- Fire District 1 serves Deming, Everson, Nooksack, and Nugents Corner.
- Fire District 2 was amalgamated into South Whatcom Regional Fire Authority.
- Fire District 3 was merged to form Fire District 21.
- Fire District 4 contracts for service with Fire District 21.
- Fire District 5 serves Point Roberts.
- Fire District 6 was amalgamated into South Whatcom Regional Fire Authority.
- Fire District 7 serves areas near Ferndale and Cherry Point.
- Fire District 8 serves Bellingham International Airport, the Lummi Nation, and Marietta.
- Fire District 9 was amalgamated into South Whatcom Regional Fire Authority.
- Fire District 10 was amalgamated into South Whatcom Regional Fire Authority.
- Fire District 11 serves Lummi Island
- Fire District 13 was merged to form Fire District 21.
- Fire District 14 serves areas around SR 542 between Deming and Maple Falls, SR 547, and Sumas.
- Fire District 16 serves communities along SR 9 south of SR 542.
- Fire District 17 serves Sandy Point.
- Fire District 18 serves southern Lake Whatcom and Glenhaven Lakes.
- Fire District 19 serves Glacier.
- Fire District 21, North Whatcom Fire and Rescue serves northwest Whatcom County including Birch Bay, Blaine, Laurel, and Lynden (outside Lynden city limits only; the Lynden Fire Department serves Lynden), Hayne, Delta, and Greenwood
- The South Whatcom Regional Fire Authority serves Geneva, Sudden Valley, Chuckanut Drive, Lake Samish, and Yew Street Road.

=== Law enforcement ===
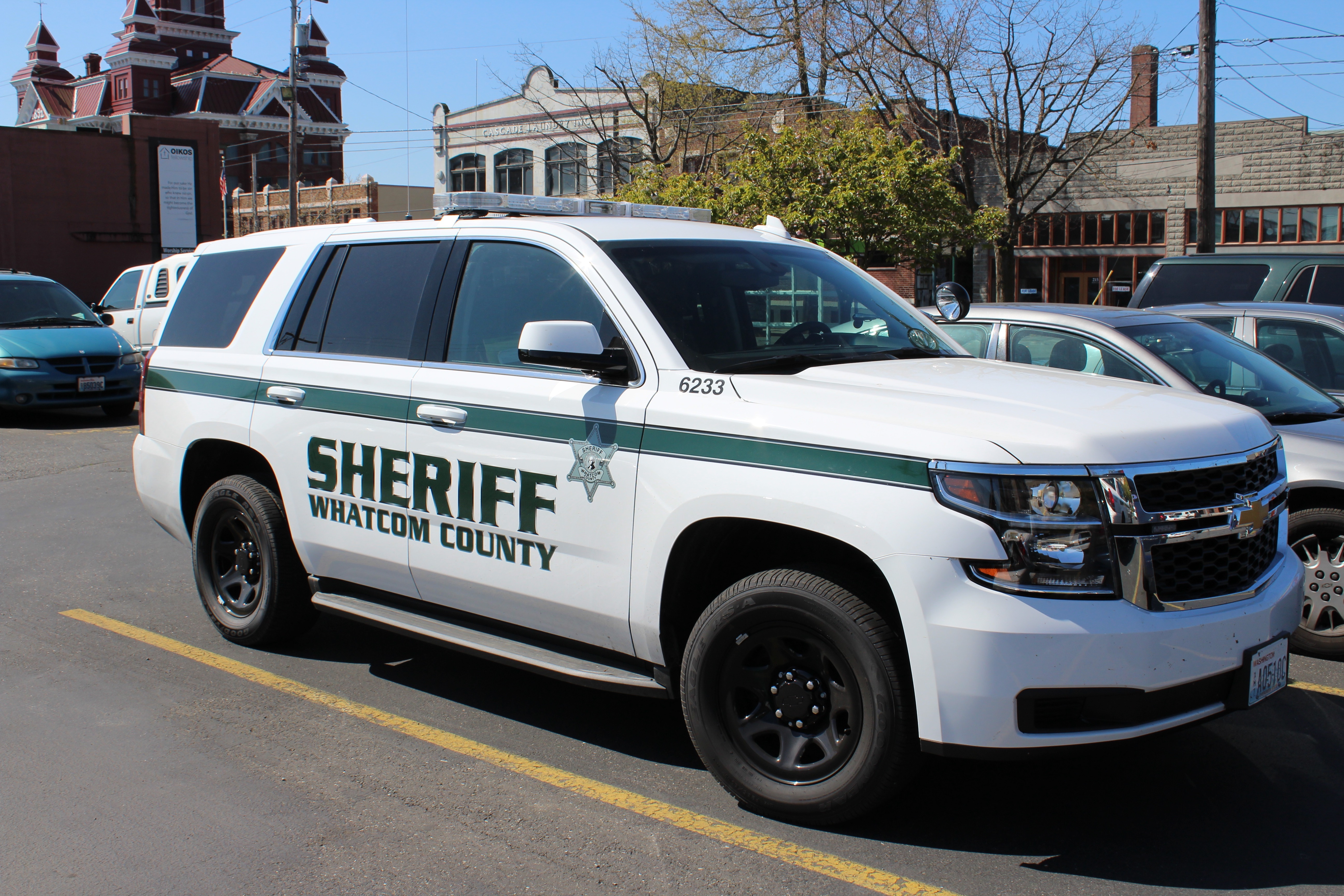
A Whatcom County Sheriff's office vehicle pictured in 2015

The Whatcom County Sheriff's Office is responsible for maintaining the county jail, providing security at the Whatcom County Superior Court, serving civil processes, coordinating emergency management among the county's emergency services, and maintaining law and order in rural areas.

The first sheriff was Ellis "Yankee" Barnes who was sworn into office in 1854, during a period in which the border between the United States and British Columbia along Whatcom County had not been fully delineated. That year, Barnes seized and auctioned 34 rams that belonged to Canadian farmer Charles Griffin for Griffin's failure to pay United States taxes. The event was one of several provocations that led to the Pig War between the United States and the United Kingdom.

In 1863 James Kavanaugh served as sheriff. Kavanaugh, who married Princess Tol Sol of the Swinomish tribe, had previously served as the first United States Marshal in the Pacific Northwest.

In 2005 the sheriff's office reported 80 deputies and 53 corrections officers on staff.

== Economy ==
Coal mines, a sawmill, and a military fort were established on Bellingham Bay in the 1850s. Logging was the principal economic activity at first, and agriculture developed as land was cleared by logging activity. Canneries, both of fish and crops, shipped the county's products far and wide.

Pacific American Fisheries incorporated in February 1899 in Fairhaven and became the world's largest canning operation, employing over 5,500 residents. Smaller canneries at Semiahmoo also produced 2,000 cases of canned salmon daily. The Fairhaven Shipyard constructed fleets of fishing ships, and it also produced freighters during World War I.

Whatcom County has a large agricultural industry that dates back to the late 19th century, when communities transitioned from logging after the removal of forests in the Nooksack Valley. The county produces 60–80 million lb (27–36 million kg) of raspberries annually, which constitutes 99 percent of Washington's crop and typically around 85 percent of the entire U.S. raspberry harvest. The local dairy and egg industries also contribute to $200 million in annual sales; the county had an estimated 48,964 dairy cows in 2007.

Cross-border activity is also a significant driver of the economy.

== Education ==
=== Primary and secondary education ===
Whatcom County residents are served by public and private schools, providing preschool, primary (K–5), and secondary (6–12) education. Public schools are operated by eight school districts. Each school district is an independent local government managed by an elected school board. Seven districts serve the western portion of Whatcom County. One district serves the southeast corner of Whatcom County. The remaining portion of the county is national forest or national park land, which has no permanent residents.

These districts (including any with any portion in the county, even if the schools are not in the county) are:

- Bellingham School District serves Bellingham, Chuckanut, Lake Samish, and Sudden Valley.
- Blaine School District serves Blaine, Birch Bay, and Point Roberts.
- Concrete School District serves the county's southeast corner, including Newhalem and Diablo.
- Ferndale School District serves Ferndale, Custer, Lummi Island, and the Lummi Nation.
- Lynden School District serves Lynden and surrounding areas.
- Meridian School District serves rural communities between Bellingham and Lynden.
- Mount Baker School District serves communities along the Mount Baker Highway and Nooksack River.
- Nooksack Valley School District serves Everson, Nooksack, and Sumas.
- Sedro-Woolley School District

Numerous private schools operate in Whatcom County, including Assumption Catholic School, Franklin Academy, Lynden Christian Schools, Bellingham Christian Schools, and the Waldorf School.

=== Higher education ===
Whatcom County hosts five institutions of higher education. Western Washington University (Western) is the third-largest public university in Washington. Western offers bachelor's and master's degrees through seven colleges and enrolls more than 15,000 students. Whatcom Community College is a public community college offering academic certificate programs and associate degrees. Two universities and two colleges are located in Bellingham. One college is located on the Lummi Nation (Lummi Reservation) west of Bellingham. Bellingham Technical College is a public technical and vocational college located in Bellingham. Trinity Western University (TWU) is a private, Christian university based in Langley, BC, about 25 miles (40 km) north of Bellingham. TWU operates a branch campus in Bellingham, offering undergraduate courses and supports TWU's bachelor's degree completion program.

Northwest Indian College is a college supported by the Lummi Nation and serves the Native American community. Northwest Indian College is located on the Lummi Nation (Lummi Reservation), about five miles (8 km) west of Bellingham.

== Communities ==
=== Cities ===
- Bellingham (County Seat)
- Blaine
- Everson
- Ferndale
- Lynden
- Nooksack
- Sumas

=== CDPs ===
- Acme
- Birch Bay
- Custer
- Deming
- Geneva
- Glacier
- Kendall
- Maple Falls
- Marietta-Alderwood
- Peaceful Valley
- Point Roberts
- Sudden Valley

=== Indian nations ===
- Lummi
- Nooksack

=== Unincorporated communities ===
- Beach
- Blue Canyon
- Cedarville
- Clipper
- Diablo
- Greenwood
- Laurel
- Lawrence
- Lummi Island
- Maple Beach
- Mountain View
- Newhalem
- Noon
- Van Wyck
- Van Zandt
- Welcome

=== Ghost towns ===
- Barron
- Goshen
- Park
- Standard

== Notable people ==
- Steve Alvord, defensive tackle in the NFL in 1987–88
- Tim Soares (born 1997), basketball player for Ironi Ness Ziona of the Israeli Basketball Premier League
- Ryan Stiles, Emmy Award-nominated actor and comedian
- Hilary Swank, award-winning movie actress

== See also ==
- National Register of Historic Places listings in Whatcom County, Washington
- Nooksack Salmon Enhancement Association, a non-profit organization dedicated to salmon restoration
- Whatcom Watch, a local newspaper
