= Geneva, Washington =

- CDP
- Location of Geneva, Washington
- Coordinates: 48°44′54″N 122°24′19″W
- Country: United States
- State: Washington
- County: Whatcom

Area
  - Total: 1.3 sq mi (3.3 km^{2})
  - Land: 1.0 sq mi (2.7 km^{2})
  - Water: 0.23 sq mi (0.6 km^{2})
- Elevation: 476 ft (145 m)

Population (2020)
  - Total: 2,652
  - Density: 2,500/sq mi (980/km^{2})
- Time zone: UTC-8 (Pacific (PST))
  - Summer (DST): UTC-7 (PDT)
- FIPS code: 53-26420
- GNIS feature ID: 2408288

Geneva is an unincorporated area and census-designated place (CDP) in Whatcom County, Washington, United States. The population was 2,652 at the 2020 census.

Based on per capita income, Geneva ranks 85th of 522 areas in the state of Washington to be ranked. It is also the highest rank achieved in Whatcom County.

== Geography ==
According to the United States Census Bureau, the CDP has a total area of 1.3 square miles (3.3 km^{2}), of which, 1.0 square miles (2.7 km^{2}) of it is land and 0.2 square miles (0.6 km^{2}) of it (18.75%) is water.

== Demographics ==
Historical population
Census	Pop.	Note	%±
2000	2,257		—
2010	2,321		2.8%
2020	2,652		14.3%
U.S. Decennial Census; 1970 1980 1990; 2000 2010

Geneva first appeared as a census designated place in the 2000 U.S. census.

=== Racial and ethnic composition ===
Geneva CDP, Washington – Racial and ethnic composition Note: the US Census treats Hispanic/Latino as an ethnic category. This table excludes Latinos from the racial categories and assigns them to a separate category. Hispanics/Latinos may be of any race.
Race / Ethnicity (NH = Non-Hispanic)	Pop 2000	Pop 2010	Pop 2020	% 2000	% 2010	% 2020
White alone (NH)	2,127	2,087	2,254	94.24%	89.92%	84.99%
Black or African American alone (NH)	5	18	16	0.22%	0.78%	0.60%
Native American or Alaska Native alone (NH)	19	16	22	0.84%	0.69%	0.83%
Asian alone (NH)	17	42	78	0.75%	1.81%	2.94%
Native Hawaiian or Pacific Islander alone (NH)	1	0	4	0.04%	0.00%	0.15%
Other race alone (NH)	6	13	8	0.27%	0.56%	0.30%
Mixed race or Multiracial (NH)	25	47	169	1.11%	2.02%	6.37%
Hispanic or Latino (any race)	57	98	101	2.53%	4.22%	3.81%
Total	2,257	2,321	2,652	100.00%	100.00%	100.00%

=== 2000 census ===
As of the census of 2000, there were 2,257 people, 778 households, and 655 families residing in the CDP. The population density was 2,166.6 people per square mile (837.9/km^{2}). There were 809 housing units at an average density of 776.6/sq mi (300.3/km^{2}). The racial makeup of the CDP was 95.92% White, 0.22% African American, 0.84% Native American, 0.75% Asian, 0.04% Pacific Islander, 0.97% from other races, and 1.24% from two or more races. Hispanic or Latino of any race were 2.53% of the population.

There were 778 households, out of which 43.6% had children under the age of 18 living with them, 73.9% were married couples living together, 6.7% had a female householder with no husband present, and 15.8% were non-families. 11.7% of all households were made up of individuals, and 3.2% had someone living alone who was 65 years of age or older. The average household size was 2.90 and the average family size was 3.11.

In the CDP, the age distribution of the population shows 29.5% under the age of 18, 6.6% from 18 to 24, 27.5% from 25 to 44, 27.9% from 45 to 64, and 8.6% who were 65 years of age or older. The median age was 38 years. For every 100 females, there were 100.4 males. For every 100 females age 18 and over, there were 96.3 males.

The median income for a household in the CDP was $65,324, and the median income for a family was $71,389. Males had a median income of $48,103 versus $40,089 for females. The per capita income for the CDP was $25,374. None of the families and 2.0% of the population were living below the poverty line, including no under eighteens and none of those over 64.

== Education ==
The community is served by the Bellingham School District. Geneva Elementary School opened in 1982 to replace an earlier building that was constructed in 1890 and had served elementary students in the area alongside other schools in the district. The old school building was sold to a private school. Middle school students are sent to Kulshan Middle School, while Geneva is divided between the zones of Bellingham High School and Sehome High School.
