= Sudden Valley, Washington =

- Census-designated place
- Location of Sudden Valley, Washington
- Coordinates: 48°43′53″N 122°21′45″W
- Country: United States
- State: Washington
- County: Whatcom

Area
  - Total: 8.1 sq mi (21.0 km^{2})
  - Land: 6.2 sq mi (16.1 km^{2})
  - Water: 1.9 sq mi (4.8 km^{2})
- Elevation: 748 ft (228 m)

Population (2020)
  - Total: 6,354
  - Density: 1,020/sq mi (395/km^{2})
- Time zone: UTC-8 (Pacific (PST))
  - Summer (DST): UTC-7 (PDT)
- Area code(s): 360, 564
- FIPS code: 53-68200
- GNIS feature ID: 2410015
- Website: http://suddenvalley.com/

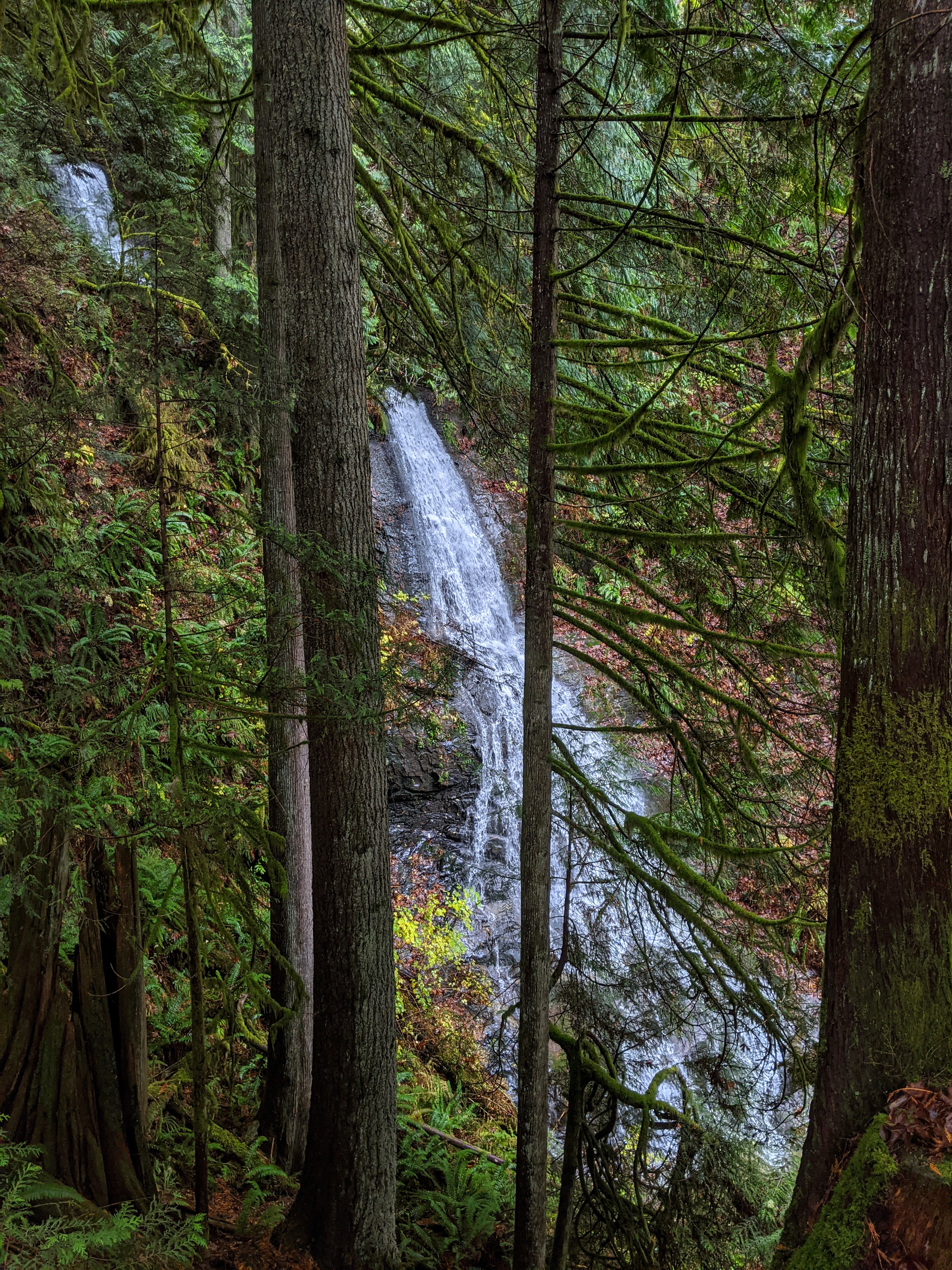
Rufus Creek Falls in Lookout Mountain Preserve, which is within Sudden Valley. Rufus Creek is a tributary to Beaver Creek, which flows to Lake Whatcom.

Sudden Valley is a census-designated place (CDP) just outside Bellingham in Whatcom County, Washington. The population was 6,354 at the 2020 census, down from 6,441 at the 2010 census.

Sudden Valley is the second-largest homeowner association in western Washington.

== History ==
The original owner of the area was Banning Austin. In 1949, Austin sold the land to Glen and Betty Corning, who named it "the Ranch" and lived there with their children until in 1968 they sold 1,200 acres of property for $1.8 million. The new owner was Ken Sanwick of Sudden Valley Inc. Sanwick envisioned the land as "Sudden Valley Undevelopment" and wanted to preserve the natural surroundings while still incorporating homes into the wilderness. By 1969, the County Commissioners approved the first plan for 158 lots west of Lake Whatcom Boulevard. The first property owner was Mae Schatz, who bought Division 1 Lot 112 in May 1969.

In the 1970s, the Valley changed ownership a few times. SunMark Inc. bought out the Sanwick Corporation in 1973, and in 1975 Continental Mortgage Investors took over from SunMark as the developer. This was short-lived, as CMI declared bankruptcy not long after. In December 1976, ownership and control was transferred to the newly named Sudden Valley Community Association. The owner of SunMark, Roger Ufkes, who happened to be the son of the first property owner, formed the original board of directors for the new Community Association. Ufkes served on the Board for two years in the early 1970s and is credited for urging property owners to buy the golf course and all its subsidiaries for $1.4 million. The one‐time assessment fee of $4,000 was voted on and passed by the residents. From this point on, the SVCA held the title to all the roads, parks, greenbelt, recreation facilities, marina, airstrip, and the country club. Sudden Valley was well on its way to becoming the community it is today.

Ever since its conception in the late 1960s, over 7,000 residents, plus an abundance of wildlife call it home. Sudden Valley offers activities for all ages and abilities, including a marina, library, parks, playgrounds, miles of hiking trails, and an 18-hole golf course designed by the architect Ted Robinson.

The community center recreation area includes a state‐of‐the‐art fitness center and an outdoor 25-yard swimming pool. A "quiet pool" is also available near the library.

== Demographics ==
As of the census of 2000, there were 4,165 people, 1,675 households, and 1,185 families residing in the CDP. The population density was 668.8 people per square mile (258.1/km^{2}). There were 1,984 housing units at an average density of 318.6/sq mi (123.0/km^{2}). The racial makeup of the CDP was 92.24% White, 0.79% African American, 1.61% Native American, 1.97% Asian, 0.12% Pacific Islander, 0.91% from other races, and 2.35% from two or more races. Hispanic or Latino of any race were 3.03% of the population.

There were 1,675 households, out of which 31.4% had children under the age of 18 living with them, 61.5% were married couples living together, 6.1% had a female householder with no husband present, and 29.2% were non-families. 20.7% of all households were made up of individuals, and 4.9% had someone living alone who was 65 years of age or older. The average household size was 2.49 and the average family size was 2.87.

In the CDP, the age distribution of the population shows 23.5% under the age of 18, 8.2% from 18 to 24, 30.5% from 25 to 44, 28.3% from 45 to 64, and 9.6% who were 65 years of age or older. The median age was 38 years. For every 100 females, there were 105.7 males. For every 100 females age 18 and over, there were 102.2 males.

The median income for a household in the CDP was $51,843, and the median income for a family was $60,250. Males had a median income of $45,568 versus $33,565 for females. The per capita income for the CDP was $24,563. About 4.3% of families and 6.4% of the population were below the poverty line, including 6.0% of those under age 18 and 4.0% of those age 65 or over.

== Education ==
The community is served by the Bellingham School District. Students in Sudden Valley are sent to Geneva Elementary School, Kulshan Middle School, and Bellingham High School.
