= Greenwood, Washington =

Unincorporated community in Washington, US

- Unincorporated community
- Location within Washington (state)
- Coordinates: 48°54′50″N 122°26′31″W
- Country: United States
- State: Washington
- County: Whatcom
- Established: 1901
- Elevation: 85 ft (26 m)
- Time zone: UTC-8 (Pacific (PST))
  - Summer (DST): UTC-7 (PDT)
- Area code(s): 360, 564
- GNIS feature ID: 1511014

Greenwood is an unincorporated community in Whatcom County, in the U.S. state of Washington.

== History ==
A post office called Greenwood was in operation from 1901 until 1902. The community was named for a grove of evergreen near the original town site.

== Geography ==
The commercial center of the community is at the intersection of Greenwood Ave. N. and N. 85th St.

== Events ==
Since 1993, on the last Saturday of June, the community has annually sponsored the Greenwood Car Show. The Greenwood Seafair Parade is also annually held in the community on the fourth Wednesday of July.
