= Custer, Washington =

- CDP
- Location of Custer, Washington
- Coordinates: 48°54′20″N 122°37′43″W
- Country: United States
- State: Washington
- County: Whatcom

Area
  - Total: 1.8 sq mi (4.7 km^{2})
  - Land: 1.8 sq mi (4.7 km^{2})
  - Water: 0 sq mi (0.0 km^{2})
- Elevation: 39 ft (12 m)

Population (2020)
  - Total: 518
  - Density: 290/sq mi (110/km^{2})
- Time zone: UTC-8 (Pacific (PST))
  - Summer (DST): UTC-7 (PDT)
- ZIP Code: 98240
- Area code: 360, 564
- FIPS code: 53-16375
- GNIS feature ID: 2408634

Custer is a census-designated place (CDP) in Whatcom County, Washington, United States. The population was 518 at the 2020 census, up from 366 at the 2010 census.

== Geography ==
According to the United States Census Bureau, the CDP has a total area of 1.8 square miles (4.7 km^{2}), all of it land.

== Demographics ==
Historical population
Census	Pop.	Note	%±
2000	299		—
2010	366		22.4%
2020	518		41.5%
U.S. Decennial Census; 1970 1980 1990; 2000 2010

Custer first appeared as a census-designated place in the 2000 U.S. census.

=== Racial and ethnic composition ===
Custer CDP, Washington – Racial and ethnic composition Note: the US Census treats Hispanic/Latino as an ethnic category. This table excludes Latinos from the racial categories and assigns them to a separate category. Hispanics/Latinos may be of any race.
Race / Ethnicity (NH = Non-Hispanic)	Pop 2000	Pop 2010	Pop 2020	% 2000	% 2010	% 2020
White alone (NH)	269	318	396	89.97%	86.89%	76.45%
Black or African American alone (NH)	0	2	1	0.00%	0.55%	0.19%
Native American or Alaska Native alone (NH)	0	1	6	0.00%	0.27%	1.16%
Asian alone (NH)	5	7	7	1.67%	1.91%	1.35%
Native Hawaiian or Pacific Islander alone (NH)	0	0	0	0.00%	0.00%	0.00%
Other race alone (NH)	0	2	0	0.00%	0.55%	0.00%
Mixed race or Multiracial (NH)	2	4	12	0.67%	1.09%	2.32%
Hispanic or Latino (any race)	23	32	96	7.69%	8.74%	18.53%
Total	299	366	518	100.00%	100.00%	100.00%

=== 2000 census ===
As of the census of 2000, there were 299 people, 108 households, and 81 families residing in the CDP. The population density was 164.4 people per square mile (63.5 people/km^{2}). There were 116 housing units at an average density of 63.8 units per square mile (24.6 units/km^{2}). The racial makeup of the CDP was 92.31% White, 1.67% Asian, 5.35% from other races, and 0.67% from two or more races. Hispanic or Latino of any race were 7.69% of the population.

There were 108 households, out of which 35.2% had children under the age of 18 living with them, 67.6% were married couples living together, 5.6% had a female householder with no husband present, and 24.1% were non-families. 18.5% of all households were made up of individuals, and 10.2% had someone living alone who was 65 years of age or older. The average household size was 2.77 and the average family size was 3.23.

In the CDP, the age distribution of the population shows 28.8% under the age of 18, 7.7% from 18 to 24, 24.7% from 25 to 44, 26.8% from 45 to 64, and 12.0% who were 65 years of age or older. The median age was 36 years. For every 100 females, there were 96.7 males. For every 100 females age 18 and over, there were 104.8 males.

The median income for a household in the CDP was $24.094, and the median income for a family was $30,625. Males had a median income of $38,135 versus $23,977 for females. The per capita income for the CDP was $13,371. About 18.2% of families and 27.7% of the population were below the poverty line, including 31.1% of those under the age of eighteen and 41.7% of those 65 or over.

== History ==
Custer was named in 1886 after Albert W. Custer, an early settler and the first storekeeper and postmaster of the town. Originally the town was located at the intersection of the current Valley View and Bay Roads. In 1890-1892 the town moved to the current location with the coming of the railroad.

In December 2020, a train derailment led to the spill of approximately 30,000 gallons of oil. Most of the oil burned or evaporated, but possibly up to 8,000 gallons of a type of crude oil could not be recovered. Within weeks, air quality was considered normal and soil mitigation was completed, but the testing of groundwater and ongoing cleanup has been determined to take several years.

== Education ==
The community is served by the Ferndale School District.

== Notable people ==
Country singer Loretta Lynn was a resident of Custer in the 1950s and early 1960s at the start of her legendary career.

== Notable businesses ==
- Tony’s Tavern, on Main Street, was established in 1949 by Tony and Marydean Winski. Their daughter, Tonia McDonald, took over the business in 1994. According to Custer Historical Museum curator Steve Russell, the tavern occupies the former Custer Hippodrome building. During the COVID-19 pandemic in 2021, volunteers helped assemble a canopy for outdoor dining, and the Whatcom County Council authorized a temporary closure of part of Fourth Street to provide additional dining space while seating restrictions remained in effect.
