= Ferndale High School (Washington) =

Public high school in Ferndale, Washington, United States

Location
- 5830 Golden Eagle Drive; Ferndale, Washington 98248; United States; 48.852°N 122.593°W

Information
- Type: Public high school
- Motto: It's a Matter of Pride
- School district: Ferndale School District
- Principal: Ravinder Dhillon
- Staff: 71.50 (FTE)
- Grades: 9–12
- Enrollment: 1,338 (2023–24)
- Average class size: 30
- Student to teacher ratio: 18.71
- Colors: Gold & Blue
- Athletics conference: Northwest Conference 3A/ Wesco 3A (Football Only)
- Mascot: Golden Eagles
- Rival: Lynden High School
- Newspaper: The Eagle Eye
- Yearbook: The Aquila
- Feeder schools: Horizon Middle School; Vista Middle School
- Mailing Address: P.O. Box 428, Ferndale, WA 98248-0428
- Telephone: (360) 383-9240
- Website: ferndalehigh.ferndalesd.org

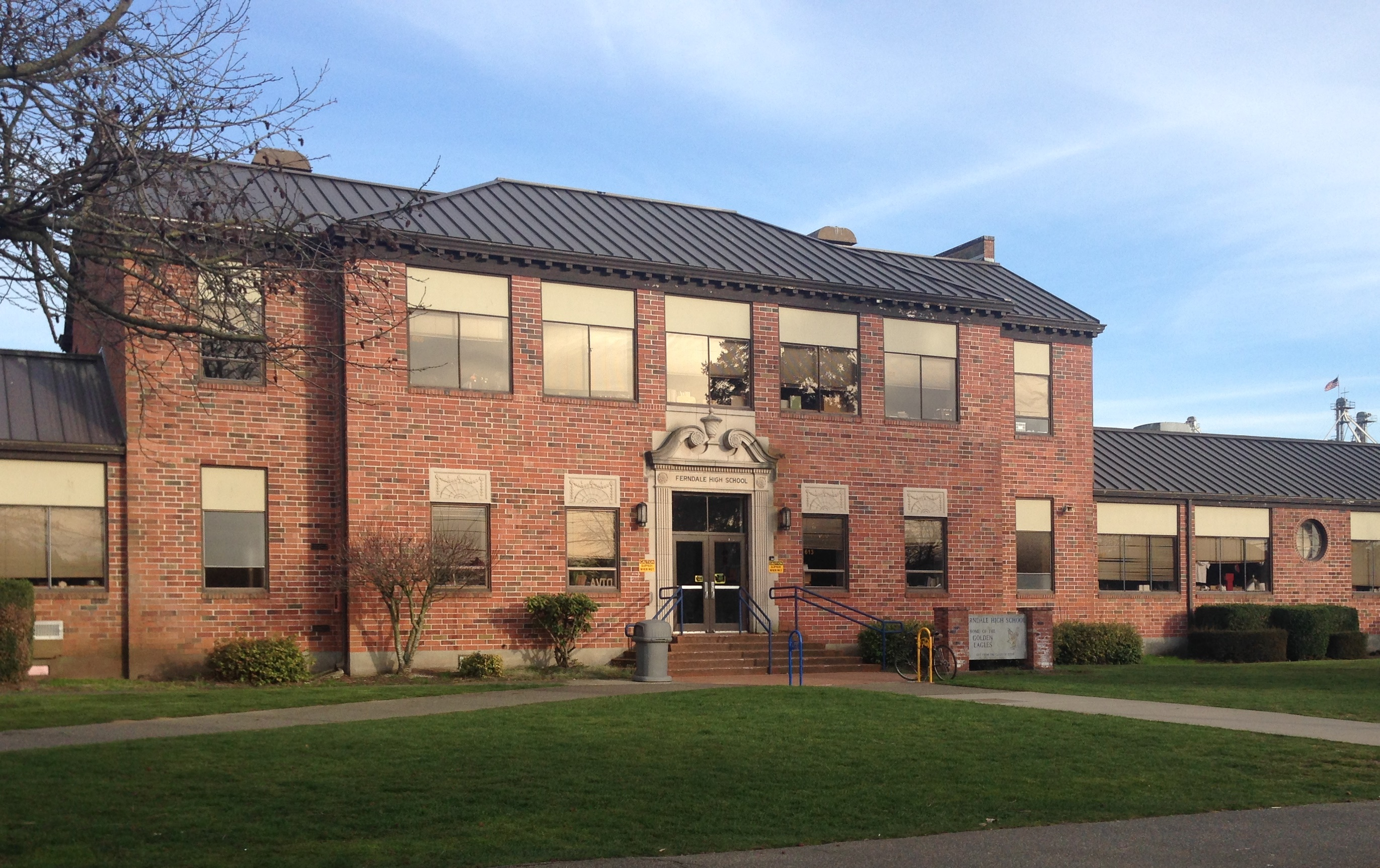
The historic facade

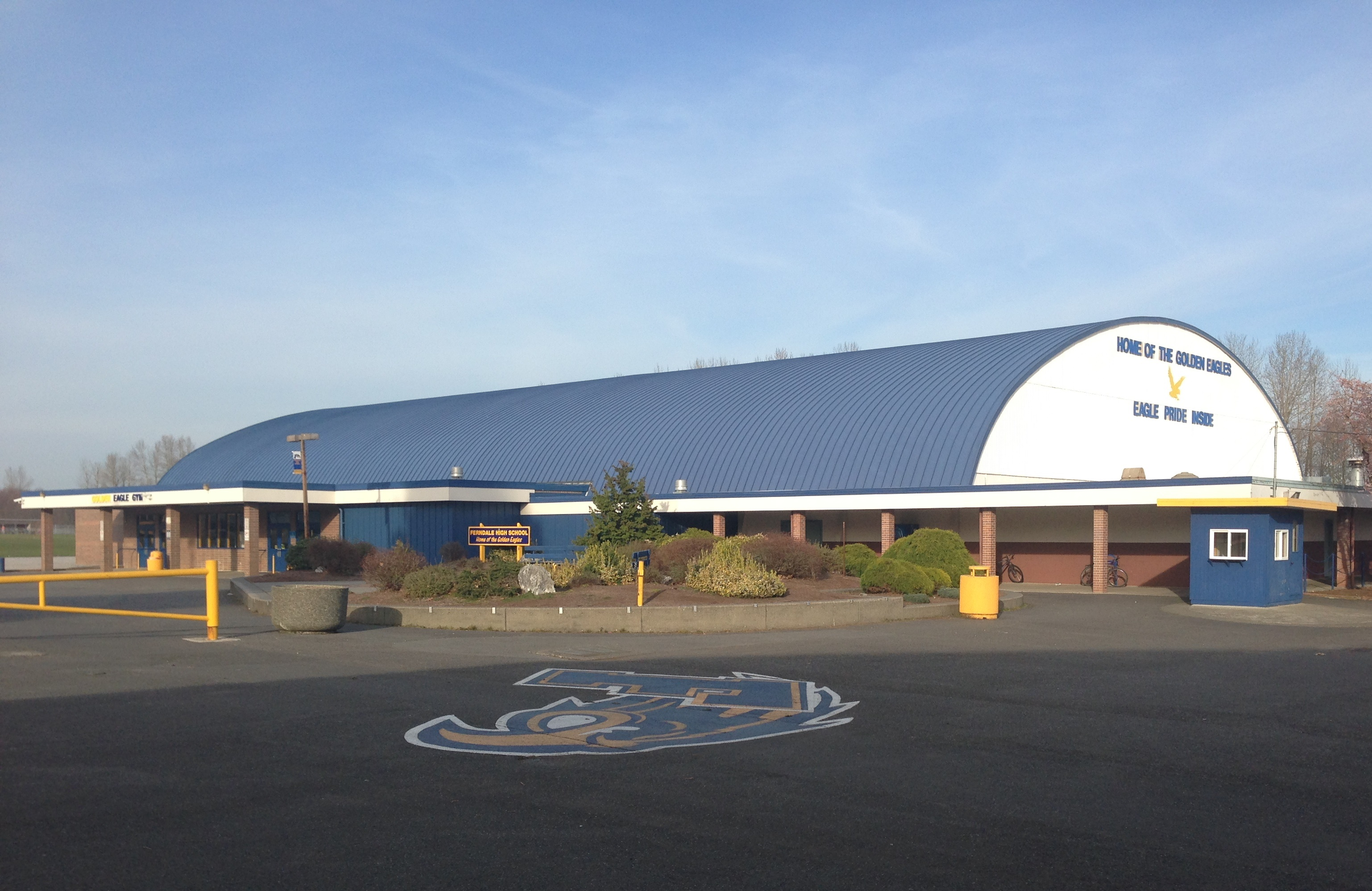
Golden Eagle Gymnasium

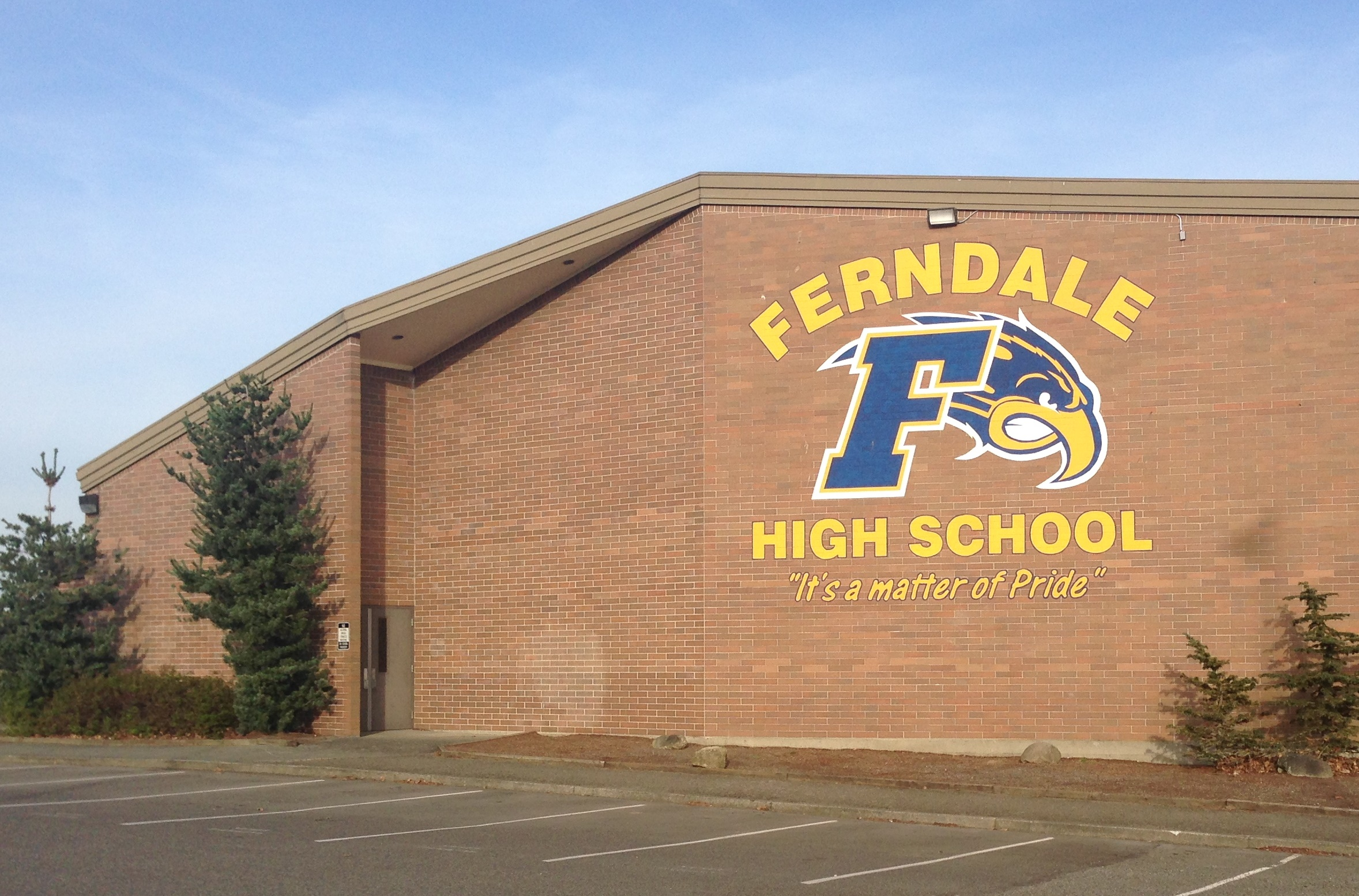
School Auditorium

Ferndale High School is the only high school in Ferndale, Washington. Ferndale High School (FHS) is located on the coast of Puget Sound, in the northwest region of Washington State. The school is north of Bellingham and approximately ten miles (16 km) south of the Canada–US border.

The school has a diverse student population that includes members of the nearby Lummi Nation and immigrants from the Americas, Asia, Europe, and other nations.

== Notable graduates ==
- Michael Koenen, NFL punter, Atlanta Falcons (2005–2010), Tampa Bay Buccaneers (2011–2014)
- Jake Locker, NFL quarterback, Tennessee Titans (2011–2014)
- Daran Norris, voice actor (Ned's Declassified School Survival Guide, The Fairly OddParents)
- Doug Pederson, NFL quarterback (1993–2004), head coach of the Philadelphia Eagles (2016–2020) and Jacksonville Jaguars (2022–2024)
- Jim Suhr, class of 1966. U.S Naval Academy 1970. Became the captain of a nuclear powered attack submarine.
- Bud Granger, class of 1966. U.S Naval Academy, 1970. Spent a career as a U.S. Marine Corps pilot and test pilot.
