= Bellingham School District =

School district in Washington, U.S.

Bellingham Public Schools

Address
- 1985 Barkley Boulevard Bellingham, Washington, 98226; United States
- Coordinates: 48.7714°N 122.4477°W

District information
- Motto: A Collective Commitment
- Grades: K–12, with preschool and pre-K offered for certain students.
- Superintendent: Greg Baker
- Schools: 14 elementary, 4 middle, 4 high
- NCES District ID: 5300420

Students and staff
- Students: 11,614 (2022–2023)
- Teachers: 705.48 (FTE; 2022–2023)
- Student–teacher ratio: 16.46 (2022–2023)

Other information
- Website: bellinghamschools.org

Bellingham School District No. 501 (operating as Bellingham Public Schools) is a public school district serving Bellingham, Washington. The district enrolls nearly 12,000 students across its schools and programs, and is the fourth-largest employer in Whatcom County. The strategic plan of Bellingham Public Schools is known as "The Bellingham Promise".

In 2006, the Center for Digital Education, along with the National School Boards Association, named the Bellingham School District 6th in the nation for districts with 2501–15000 students. They were also awarded an "excellence in equity" award in 2019, from the Washington State School Directors' Association, and a green ribbon for sustainability from the U.S. Department of Education in 2022.

The district includes the vast majority of the Bellingham city limits, as well as the unincorporated areas of Geneva and Sudden Valley and most of Marietta-Alderwood. A small piece of Ferndale also extends into the district.

== Schools ==
=== High schools ===
Bellingham Public Schools includes four high schools, all serving grades 9–12.

School	Mascot	Enrollment (2022–2023)	WIAA	Notes
Bellingham High School (BHS)	Bayhawks	1,218	Northwest Conference (2A)	Located in the Sunnyland neighborhood, Bellingham's attendance area includes most of Bellingham's city center, and is bound by Squalicum's area to the north and Sehome's to the south.
Options High School (OHS)	Armadillos	188	None	Located directly adjacent to Bellingham High School, Options is a "school of choice" and does not have its own attendance area. Options provides an alternative education experience, with smaller class sizes for more accessible learning.
Sehome High School (SHS)	Mariners	1,163	Northwest Conference (2A)	Located in the Happy Valley neighborhood, Sehome is the southernmost of the district's high schools.
Squalicum High School (SqHS)	Storm	1,280	Northwest Conference (2A)	Located in the Barkley neighborhood, Squalicum is the northernmost of the district's high schools.

=== Middle schools ===
The district includes four grade 6–8 middle schools.

School	Mascot	Feeds to	Notes
Fairhaven Middle School	Grizzly Bears	Sehome	Fairhaven is located in the Edgemoor neighborhood. The school was originally Fairhaven High School, but it burned down New Year's Eve of 1935, reopening as a junior high in 1937 and a middle school in 1967.
Kulshan Middle School	Thunderbirds	Bellingham, Sehome, and Squalicum	Kulshan is located in the Whatcom Falls neighborhood. It was to open in the fall of 1994, burned down in July 1993, but still opened for the school year beginning in 1994.
Shuksan Middle School	Cougars	Bellingham and Squalicum	Shuksan is located in the Birchwood neighborhood.
Whatcom Middle School	Wildcats	Bellingham and Squalicum	Whatcom is located in the Lettered Streets neighborhood. The school was originally built in 1903 and named North Side High School. It was also named Whatcom High School before becoming a middle school. Whatcom Middle School burned down on November 5, 2009; due to rebuilding, the school reopened in 2011.

=== Elementary schools ===
There are 14 grade K–5 elementary schools in the district.

School	Neighborhood	Feeds to	Notes
Alderwood Elementary School	Alderwood	Shuksan	Outside of city limits. Nicknamed the Dolphins. International Baccalaureate Primary Years Program (IB PYP) school since 2018.
Birchwood Elementary School	Birchwood	Shuksan	Nicknamed the Bulldogs. IB PYP school since 2018.
Carl Cozier Elementary School	Puget	Fairhaven and Kulshan	Nicknamed the Cougars. IB PYP school since 2017.
Columbia Elementary School	Columbia	Shuksan	Nicknamed the Cohos. IB PYP school since 2022.
Cordata Elementary School	Cordata	Shuksan and Whatcom	Nicknamed the Bobcats.
Geneva Elementary School	Geneva	Kulshan	Outside of city limits. Nicknamed the Gnomes.
Happy Valley Elementary School	Happy Valley	Fairhaven	Nicknamed the Hornets. Located adjacent to the campus of Western Washington University.
Lowell Elementary School	South Hill	Fairhaven	The Lowell building was built in 1914, replacing the 14th Street School that existed on the property. It is named for James Russell Lowell. The students' nickname is the Lowell Labs.
Northern Heights Elementary School	Barkley	Shuksan and Whatcom	Nicknamed the Huskies. IB PYP school since 2011.
Parkview Elementary School	Cornwall Park	Whatcom	Nicknamed the Pandas.
Roosevelt Elementary School	Roosevelt	Kulshan	Nicknamed the Bears in honor of Theodore Roosevelt's love for wildlife. IB PYP school since 2024.
Silver Beach Elementary School	Silver Beach	Kulshan and Whatcom	Nicknamed the Silverhawks.
Sunnyland Elementary School	Sunnyland	Whatcom	Nicknamed the Lions.
Wade King Elementary School	South Yew Street	Fairhaven and Kulshan	Outside of city limits. Nicknamed the Wolves. IB PYP school since 2010.

=== Other programs ===
- Bellingham Family Partnership Program – The Family Partnership Program provides resources and onsite enrichment to families choosing to homeschool their K–8 children. It operates out of the former Larrabee Elementary School building. Larrabee Elementary School, in the Happy Valley neighborhood, was originally built in 1890 as Larrabee Grammar School and named after Charles Xavier Larrabee. It closed in 2014.
- Community Transitions – A special education program serving students "through the end of the school year in which they turn 22" in order to develop post-schooling skills for those with disabilities.

=== Notes ===
Neighborhood location source: City of Bellingham. International Baccalaureate source: Bellingham Public Schools.
