= Steve Alvord =

American football player (born 1964)

No. 60, 61
- Positions: Defensive tackle, defensive end

Personal information
- Born: October 2, 1964 (age 62); Bellingham, Washington, U.S.
- Listed height: 6 ft 4 in (1.93 m)
- Listed weight: 272 lb (123 kg)

Career information
- High school: Bellingham
- College: Washington
- NFL draft: 1987: 8th round, 201st overall pick

Career history
- St. Louis/Phoenix Cardinals (1987–1989); Seattle Seahawks (1990)*; Barcelona Dragons (1991–1992)
- * Offseason or practice squad member only

Career NFL statistics
- Sacks: 3.5
- Stats at Pro Football Reference

Steven Lee Alvord (born October 2, 1964) is an American former professional football player who was a defensive tackle and defensive end in the National Football League (NFL) and World League of American Football (WLAF). In his four-year pro career he played for the St. Louis/Phoenix Cardinals of the NFL and the Barcelona Dragons of the WLAF. Alvord played college football for the Washington Huskies.

== Professional career ==
Pre-draft measurables
Height	Weight	Arm length	Hand span	40-yard dash	10-yard split	20-yard split	20-yard shuttle	Vertical jump	Broad jump	Bench press
6 ft 4 1/2 in (1.94 m)	273 lb (124 kg)	34 in (0.86 m)	8 3/4 in (0.22 m)	4.86 s	1.69 s	2.76 s	4.49 s	28.5 in (0.72 m)	9 ft 0 in (2.74 m)	18 reps
All values from NFL Combine

=== St. Louis/Phoenix Cardinals ===
Alvord was selected by the St. Louis Cardinals in the eighth round (201st overall) of the 1987 NFL draft.
