= Sehome High School =

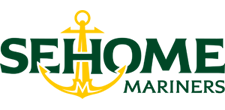

Location
- 2700 Bill McDonald Parkway; Bellingham, Washington 98225; United States; 48°43′39″N 122°28′53″W

Information
- Type: Public high school
- Established: 1966
- School district: Bellingham Public Schools
- Principal: Sonia Cole
- Teaching staff: 50.50 FTE
- Enrollment: 1,175 (2023–2024)
- Student to teacher ratio: 23.27
- Colors: Green and gold
- Athletics conference: WIAA – Northwest Conference (2A)
- Mascot: Mariners
- Newspaper: The Rising Tide
- Yearbook: Windjammer
- Website: sehome.bellinghamschools.org

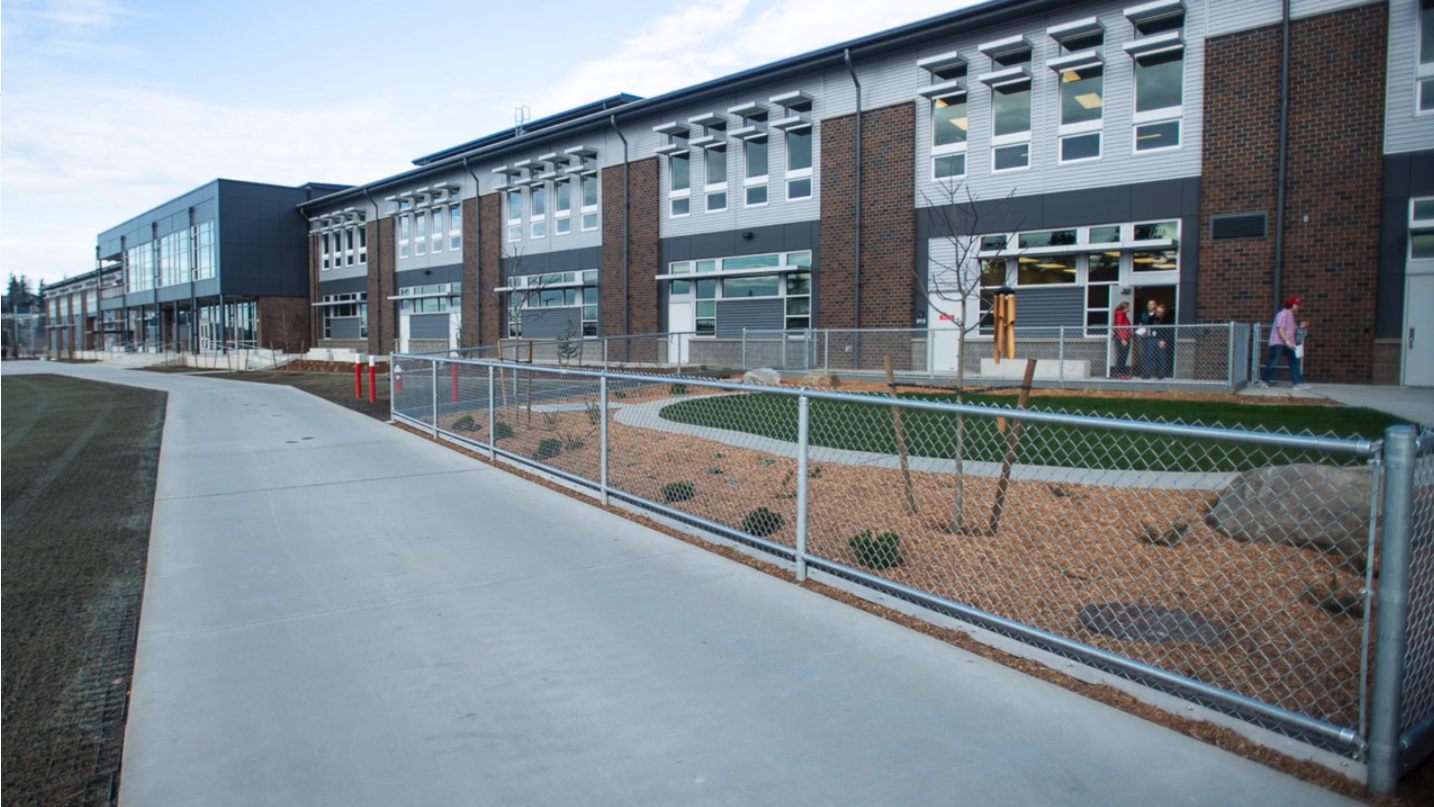

Sehome High School (SHS) is a public high school in Bellingham, Washington. Sehome is one of four high schools operated by Bellingham Public Schools, and primarily serves students from southern Bellingham. 1,148 students were enrolled for the 2025–2026 school year. Sehome competes as the Sehome Mariners in the Washington Interscholastic Activities Association Northwest Conference (2A).

== History ==
Sehome High School took its name from the early town of Sehome (now part of Bellingham), which in turn was named for Chief Sehome of the Samish tribe. The school opened in 1966 on a site of over 40 acres (160,000 m^{2}) of land and at a total cost of $3,835,152, with its first graduating class matriculating in 1968. In 1996 the school had approximately 1,700 students. In 2008 Sehome had an enrollment of approximately 1,100 students in grades 9–12.

=== Rebuild ===
The school district's own Facilities Planning Task Force recommended that the original Sehome High School be rebuilt, due to the age and deterioration of the existing structure(s). The new school was built behind the existing structure, which allowed the existing facilities to remain open during construction.

The completed two-story building has a central commons area, similar to other high schools in the district, a 400-seat auditorium for drama and music performances, main and auxiliary gymnasiums, ceramics studio, and improved facilities for other clubs, classes, and activities.

Students began attending classes on January 30, 2019, with completion of the athletic fields and parking lots in August 2019.

The architect for the project was Dykeman, and the general contractor was Dawson Construction.

== Academics ==
Sehome High is accredited by the Northwest Association of Schools and Colleges and is a member of the Pacific Northwest Association for College Admission Counseling (PNACAC). The school requires its students to complete a High School and Beyond Plan and requires students meet the published standards on the English and Writing sections of the Washington Assessment of Student Learning (WASL). The school also offers Running Start and Tech Prep programs.

== Activities ==
Sehome offers students a variety of activities and clubs, including FRC Robotics, Crochet, Debate, DECA, Diversity, Drama Club, FBLA, Hiking, Hispanic Honor Society, Key Club, Knowledge Bowl, Math, Model UN, Peer-Centered Outreach, Photography, QSA, Robotics, Science Olympiad, Sports Med, Teen Court, and Zodiac (an interdisciplinary sailing activity in the San Juan Islands.)

Sehome High School is in the Northwest Conference (NWC), and the school mascot is the Sehome Mariner. The school's sports program is governed by the Washington Interscholastic Activities Association (WIAA), the Northwest Conference, and the district's Athletic Code and Standards. In sports, Sehome offers its students cross country, football, soccer, swimming, tennis, volleyball, basketball, bowling, gymnastics, wrestling, baseball, fastpitch, golf, track & field, cheerleading, dance and sailing.

== Notable alumni ==
- Glenn Anderson, National Hockey League player
- Glenn Beck, conservative political commentator and media host
- Billy Burke, actor
- Chelsea Cain, novelist
- Jonas Ecker, Olympic kayaker
- Doug Ericksen, Washington state senator
- Brent David Fraser, actor and writer
- Craig Johnson, film director
- Titi Lamositele, rugby union player in PREM Rugby
- Jason McGerr, drummer for Death Cab for Cutie
- Gavin Ortega, National Football League player
- Taylor Rapp, National Football League player
- Jake Riley, Olympic distance runner
- Hilary Swank, Academy Award and Golden Globe–winning actress(attended)

=== Bands ===
- Idiot Pilot, alternative rock duo
- The Posies, power pop band
