= Ferndale School District =

School district in Washington, United States

Location
- 6041 Vista Drive, Ferndale, Washington 98248 USA

District information
- Type: Public
- Grades: Pre-K through 12
- Superintendent: Dr. Kristi Dominguez
- Asst. superintendent(s): Mr. Mark Debach
- Schools: 1 High School; 2 Middle Schools; 6 Elementary Schools (2020)

Students and staff
- Students: 5,189 (May 2012)
- Teachers: 276 (2011-12)
- Student–teacher ratio: 17.72 (2010-11)

Other information
- Website: www.ferndalesd.org

Ferndale School District is a primary and secondary education school district located in Ferndale, Washington. FSD serves over 5000 students (Oct, 2012) in the city of Ferndale and surrounding areas including Custer, Lummi Island, and portions of Birch Bay and Marietta-Alderwood.

The current Superintendent of Ferndale School District is Dr. Kristi Dominguez.

In September 2012, the Ferndale School District was named as one of 10 Signature Districts for Project RED, a nationwide education technology research group funded by Hewlett-Packard, the Pearson Foundation, and SMART Technologies

== Schools ==
=== High schools ===
Grades 9 - 12

- Ferndale High School
- Windward High School (closed in 2018)

=== Middle schools ===
Grades 6 - 8

- Horizon Middle School
- Vista Middle School

=== Primary schools ===
Grades K - 5

- Beach Elementary School
- Cascadia Elementary School
- Central Elementary School
- Custer Elementary School
- Eagleridge Elementary School
- Mountain View Elementary School (closed in June 2013)
- Skyline Elementary School
