= Bellingham High School (Washington) =

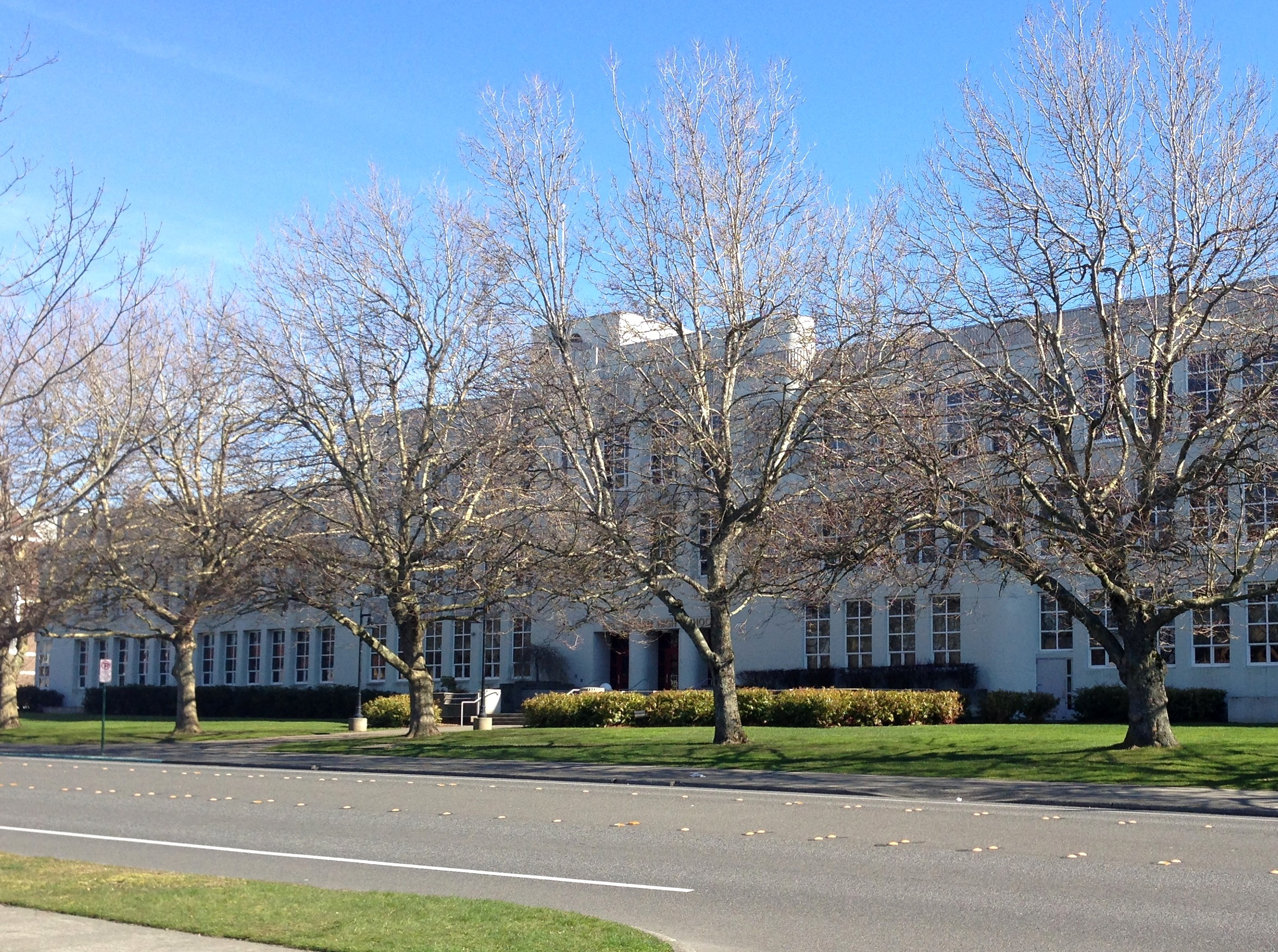
- Historic facade of Bellingham High School

Location
- 2020 Cornwall Avenue, Bellingham, Washington, United States; 48°45′25″N 122°28′27″W

Information
- Type: Public
- Established: 1938
- School district: Bellingham School District
- School number: (360) 676-6575
- Principal: Benjamin Goodwin
- Teaching staff: 54.55 (FTE)
- Grades: 9-12
- Student to teacher ratio: 21.78
- Colors: Red, Black & White
- Mascot: Bayhawks, circa 2022 (formerly Red Raiders, 1938-2021)
- Yearbook: Shuksan
- Website: Bellingham H.S.

Bellingham High School (BHS) is a public high school in the Bellingham School District located in Bellingham, Washington. The school serves students primarily from Whatcom, Kulshan, and Shuksan Middle Schools.

== History ==
Bellingham High School was dedicated on February 25, 1938. It cost $912,028.63 and took 417,026 man-hours to build.

The school was closed for two years starting in June 1998 for a massive renovation which involved gutting the entire building and even demolishing some portions. Special care was taken to preserve the art deco facade on the west side of the building.

From its inception the school mascot was the "Red Raider", a Native American chief with a massive war bonnet. In the years leading up to the school's renovation there were several occasions where questions were raised about the cultural appropriateness of such a mascot. When the school re-opened In 2000 after a two-year closure the mascot was changed to a bird of prey, but the mascot and team name "Red Raider" remained.

In 2021, the school district announced that the school's new mascot would be the Bellingham Bayhawks. The change was part of a nationwide social justice movement to get rid of offensive or insensitive mascots and logos.

== Academics ==
Bellingham High School offers a curriculum including Advanced Placement courses and other classes to prepare students for college, as well as offering the Running Start program which allows students to complete their high school diploma and earn college credit by attending Bellingham Technical College and/or Whatcom Community College.

== Athletics ==
Bellingham, competing in the Washington Interscholastic Activities Association's Northwest Conference, participates in thirteen varsity sports: baseball, basketball, cross country, fastpitch, football, golf, gymnastics, soccer, swimming, tennis, track, volleyball, and wrestling. In 2022, the school adopted a new mascot, the Bayhawks.

== Notable alumni ==
- Steve Alvord, former NFL player (Arizona Cardinals)
- Cliff Chambers, former MLB player (Chicago Cubs, Pittsburgh Pirates, St. Louis Cardinals)
- Harriett Davenport, Los Angeles, California, City Council member, 1953–55
- Lee Boyd Malvo, member of the D.C. snipers
- Cuddles Marshall, former MLB player (New York Yankees, St. Louis Browns)
- Bear McCreary, American composer
- James K. Okubo, Medal of Honor recipient
- Stephen S. Oswald, NASA astronaut
- Roger Repoz, former MLB player (New York Yankees, Kansas City Athletics, California Angels)
- Kevin Richardson, former MLB player (Texas Rangers)
- Austin Shenton, former MLB player (Seattle Mariners)
- Harry Everett Smith, American polymath
