= Hard Scrabble Falls Creek =

Stream in Washington, U.S.

Hard Scrabble Falls Creek: Hard Scrabble Creek; White Eagle Creek

Location
- Country: United States
- State: Washington
- Counties: Whatcom

Physical characteristics
- Source: Steward Mountain
  - coordinates: 48°45′28.41″N 122°15′26.58″W
- Mouth: South Fork Nooksack River
  - coordinates: 48°45′35.41″N 122°13′3.57″W
- Length: 1.928 mi (3.103 km)

Basin features
- Waterfalls: Hard Scrabble Falls

Hard Scrabble Falls Creek (or Hard Scrabble Creek) is a stream in Whatcom County, Washington. The creek flows down off the sides of Stewart Mountain, into the South Fork Nooksack in Van Zandt, Washington, 4.4 miles south of Deming, Washington. The creek has also been known by White Eagle Creek.

Hard Scrabble Falls Creek and the accompanying gulch take their name from Hard Scrabble Falls. It was named in August 1860, by a group of five gold prospectors. Among them was Frederick F. Lane, who wrote about the trip in his diary. It was named hard scrabble for the difficulty of climbing down the mountain.

== Hard Scrabble Falls ==
There are a series of tiered horsetail waterfalls along the creek, named Hard Scrabble Falls. The falls are on private property and have been closed off to the public due to unruly activity in order to preserve the land around the falls, although the falls can still be seen from Washington State Route 9.

A 1999 article in the Bellingham Herald mentioned Hard Scrabble Falls being a personal favorite, and gave directions on how to get there.

== Conservation ==
The creek has been declared as an "impaired waterbody" by the EPA for low oxygen and temperature, and there are plans in place to restore the creek.

In 2008 a local named Steve Hahn bought the land around Hard Scrabble Falls Creek to save it from a logging company that was planning on clearcutting the area. Over the next several years he worked with the Whatcom Land Trust to turn the land into a conservation easement.

== See also ==
- List of rivers of Washington (state)
