= Van Zandt, Washington =

Unincorporated community in Washington, US

- Unincorporated community
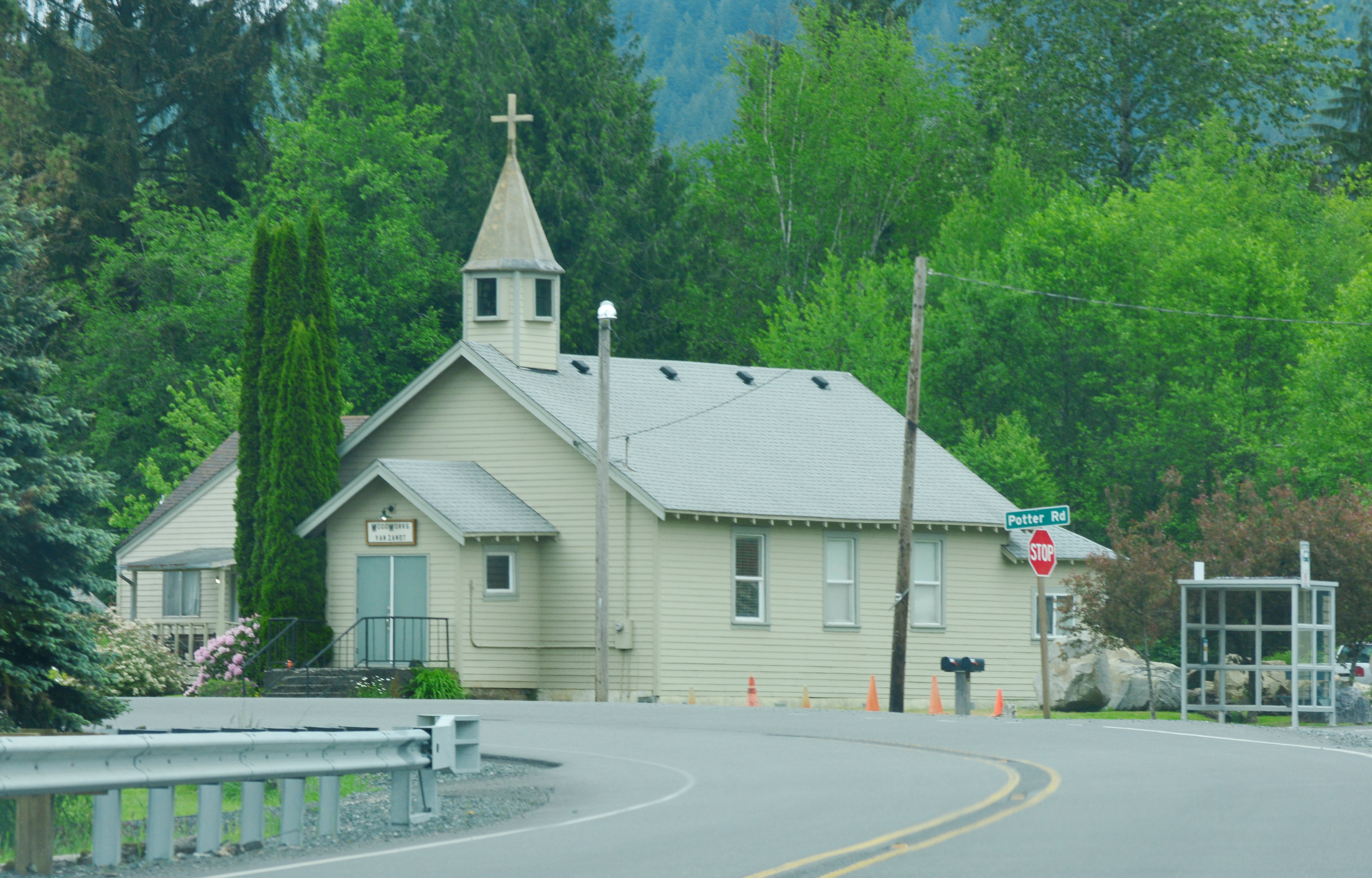
- Former church, Van Zandt, Washington, 2020
- Interactive map of Van Zandt, Washington
- Coordinates: 48°47′20″N 122°11′31″W
- Country: United States
- State: Washington
- County: Whatcom

Government
  - Type: Unincorporated community
  - Body: Whatcom County
- Elevation: 246 ft (75 m)
- Time zone: UTC–8 (Pacific (PST))
  - Summer (DST): UTC–7 (PDT)
- ZIP Code: 98220
- Area codes: 360, 564
- GNIS feature ID: 1527679

Van Zandt is an unincorporated community in Whatcom County, in the U.S. state of Washington. There is a community hall, a park, a cemetery, a volunteer firehouse, and a church located there. The community is rural, with most residents working in agriculture or lumber.

The community also lends its name to the nearby Van Zandt Dike and Van Zandt Creek.

== History ==
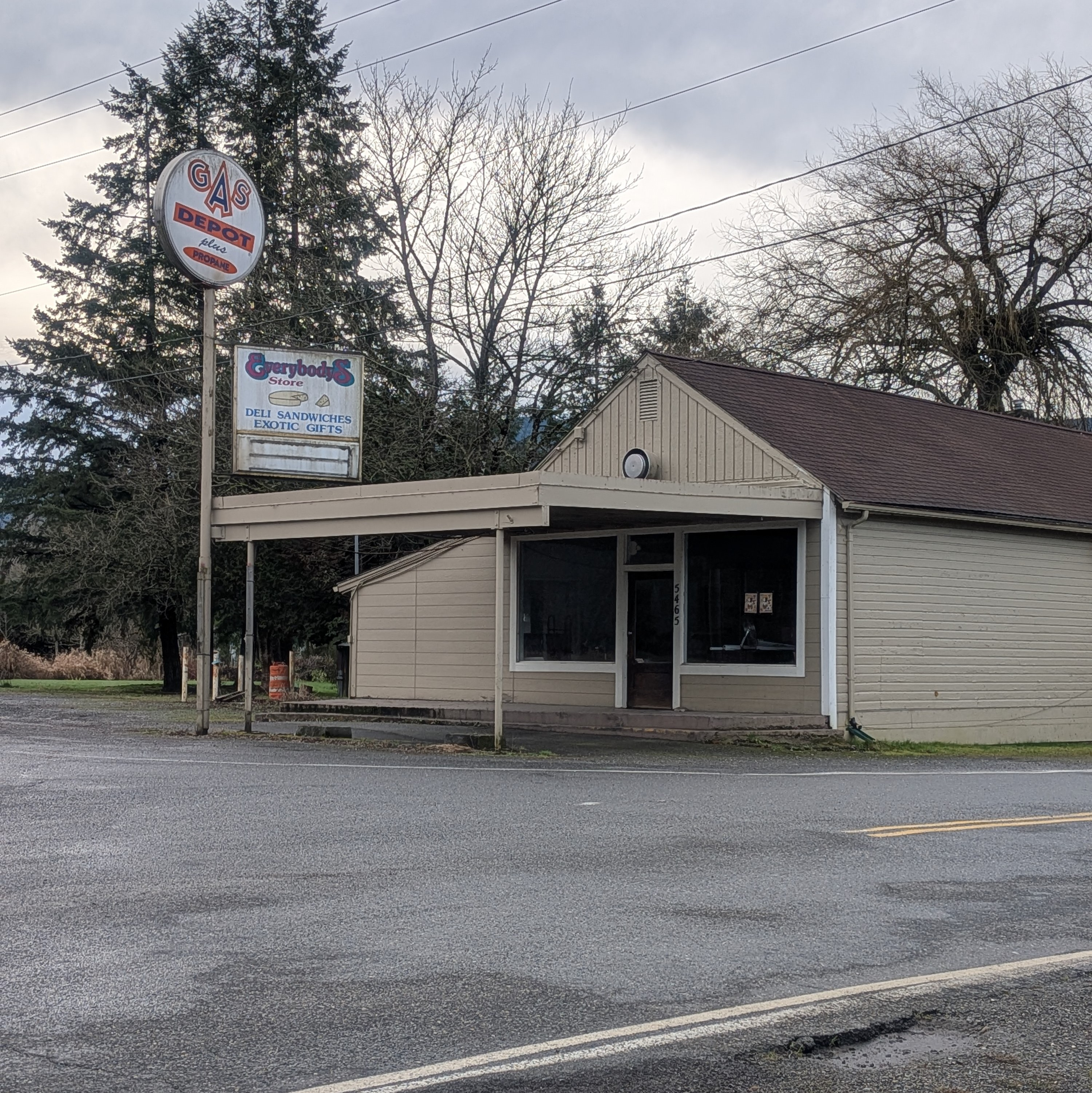
Former Everybody's Store (2026)

A post office called Van Zandt was established on January 2, 1892, and remained in operation until March 1, 1955. On its 1891 post office application, the population was listed as 100. Julian Milner Van Zandt, the first postmaster who homesteaded there in 1883, gave the community his name. Since the post office shut down, the community now relies on the post office in Deming for its mail.

Before a school was established in Van Zandt, children would attend the school in nearby Clipper. In 1891 a one-room school was built on an acre (0.40 ha) of land donated by Julian Van Zandt. The first teacher at this school later married Van Zandt, and their daughter later became a teacher as well. In 1910 another building was added to the lot, to be used for vocational and home economics classes. These two buildings were later sold to August Potter and renovated. A larger two-room schoolhouse was built in 1927 on a two-acre (0.81 ha) lot nearby, and it still stands today. Currently it serves as a community hall and a radio station hosting KAVZ-LP.

In the 1930s, after Northern Pacific Railway set up a rail line running through the valley, logging became much more popular in the area and many roads and small logging railroads were built into the sides of the valley. Northern Pacific Railway also had a flag station in the area as early as 1926.

August Potter, an early settler, and later postmaster, born in 1891, owned a small store and fuel station named "A. Potter General Merchandise", which was mentioned in a 1926 travel guide. Later, Potter Road was named in honor of the Potter family. In 1970 a small grocer, gift shop, and gas station named Everybody's Store was founded and occupied the same building. In 2019 Everybody's Store went out of business. It was a popular spot and a source of tourism in the community, selling gifts, clothes, artisan meats and cheeses, as well as ice cream.

In 1971 an 80-acre homestead was established in Van Zandt, and in 1983 the land was donated to the Evergreen Land Trust, an organization for organizing communes in Washington. Today an ecovillage commune called River Farm tends the land and holds an active role in the local community. From 1996 to 2005, River Farm hosted an annual fair called the Northwest Herbal Faire. In 2008 a local named Steve Hahn bought land around Hard Scrabble Falls Creek to save it from a logging company that was planning on clearcutting the area. Over the next several years he worked with the Whatcom Land Trust to turn the land into a conservation easement.

On Memorial Day in 2002 Josh VanderYacht Memorial Park was dedicated and officially opened. The park was dedicated to Joshua Vander Yacht, who had died at 20 years old in a construction accident in 1999, and to 31 other young adults and teens who had died young in the area. Three large olivine stone memorials stand in the park engraved with the names of the dead. There is now an annual tradition during the South Fork Valley Summerfest to read the names aloud.

In 2016 the bridge over the Nooksack River on Potter Rd was replaced, as the old bridge was built in 1927 and was becoming unsafe.

In 2024, the community fundraised to be able to repair the community hall, and the state gave the community a grant of $500,000 to do so. As of 26 March 2026 the renovations were underway, and the grand re-opening was set for May 15, 2026.

== Transportation ==
Van Zandt is located roughly between Acme and Deming, along State Route 9. The community is connected to the WTA bus line 72X via one stop in front of the community center, although this stop is only serviced twice a day. Rail tracks owned by BNSF run through the center of the community, connecting freight stations in Acme and Deming, though they make no stops in Van Zandt.

== Recreation ==
Van Zandt is home to one park, Josh VanderYacht Memorial Park, which offers courts for various sports, and a playground. Events take place in the community hall, and in a gazebo located within the park.

The valley in which Van Zandt sits features a few trails and spots for hiking. One such place, Hard Scrabble Falls, used to be a popular waterfall to hike out to but the private owner of the land has since closed the trail due to unruly activity in order to preserve the land around the falls, although the falls can still be seen from the highway. Other waterfalls and creeks do dot the valley, although they are often on private property.

Tubing down the South Fork Nooksack River used to be a popular summer activity in Van Zandt, and especially in neighboring Acme, but in 2022 the Whatcom County Council voted on banning the activity to protect salmon habitat in the river. Swimming, however, remains a popular summer activity in the area.

Van Zandt Dike used to be a spot for recreational target shooting, however after unsafe shooting practices were reported in 2024, as well as littering and timber theft, the Department of Natural Resources has decided to close down the area to target shooting. Other recreational activities are still allowed, however the gate that was once used to get up the dike is now closed.

== See also ==
- Index of Washington (state)-related articles
- List of unincorporated communities in Washington
- Deming, Washington
- Acme, Washington
