= Murder of Mandy Stavik =

Murder case of Mandy Stavik

- Date: November 24, 1989
- Location: Deming, Washington, United States
- Type: Murder
- Motive: Sexual
- Deaths: 1 (Mandy Stavik)
- Burial: Saint Joseph Mission Cemetery Clipper, Whatcom County, Washington, US
- Arrests: Timothy Bass
- Verdict: Guilty
- Convictions: Timothy Bass: First-degree murder, kidnapping and aggravated sexual assault Manslaughter
- Sentence: Timothy Bass: 27 years in prison

Amanda Teresa "Mandy" Stavik (born April 16, 1971 – disappeared November 24, 1989) was an American college student who went missing a day after Thanksgiving, while jogging near her home in Acme, Washington with her German Shepherd, Kyra. Her body was discovered three days later in the Nooksack River. The case remained unsolved for nearly 30 years until advancements in DNA technology led to an arrest and subsequent conviction.

In December 2017, Timothy Bass was arrested in Whatcom County, Washington, in connection with Stavik’s murder. Law enforcement obtained his DNA from a discarded soda can and plastic cup collected by a coworker following months of surveillance.

The case has received national media attention, including coverage by Inside Edition. On May 24, 2019, Bass was convicted of first-degree murder and sentenced to 27 years in prison.

== Background ==
Amanda Teresa Stavik was born on April 16, 1971, in Anchorage, Alaska, USA, and grew up in Deming, Washington. Stavik was an 18-year-old college student from Acme, Washington, a rural community in Whatcom County. She graduated from Mount Baker High School. Stavik was attending Central Washington University in Ellensburg at the time of her death. Family members and friends described her as athletic and active in various sports. She also participated in band, playing saxophone under director Doug Sutton, competed in basketball, softball, cross-country, and track, and served as a cheerleader. She was also an honors student.

== Disappearance and murder ==
On November 24, 1989, while home for the Thanksgiving holiday, Mandy Stavik went for a run near her family's residence along Strand Road in rural Whatcom County with Kyra, her German Shepherd. Kyra later returned cowering and covered in mud, but without Stavik, who was reported to authorities as missing. The incident garnered significant attention within the community, where violent crimes were uncommon. Local residents joined law enforcement officers in a search of the area.

Three days later, Stavik’s body was discovered in the Nooksack River. Investigators determined that she had been sexually assaulted before being killed, prompting a homicide investigation that remained unsolved for nearly three decades.

At the time, forensic technology was not advanced enough to identify a suspect. Despite extensive efforts by law enforcement, the case remained unsolved for nearly 30 years, with few leads and no suspects.

== Investigation and breakthrough ==
For nearly three decades, Mandy Stavik's murder remained a cold case. Investigators collected DNA evidence from the scene, but the technology at the time was not advanced enough to lead to a suspect. However, in the late 2000s and early 2010s, advancements in DNA analysis revived the investigation.

In 2013, investigators narrowed their focus on Timothy Bass, who lived near Stavik’s home at the time of her disappearance. Bass had not been a suspect during the initial investigation, but he became a person of interest when police began using familial DNA techniques to trace the unknown DNA sample collected from the crime scene.

Police covertly obtained Bass's DNA from a discarded soda can and plastic cup collected by a coworker after three months of surveillance. The DNA matched the sample found on Stavik’s body, leading to Bass's arrest in December 2017.

=== Trial and conviction ===
Timothy Bass was charged with Mandy Stavik's murder in 2017. During Bass's trial in 2019, the prosecution, led by Chief Criminal Deputy Prosecutor Erik Sigmar, presented DNA evidence linking Bass to the crime. Bass, who was married with children at the time of his arrest, maintained his innocence and claimed he and Stavik had consensual sex. However, no evidence supported his claims, and his defense was unable to explain why he had never come forward about the alleged relationship before his arrest.

On May 24, 2019, Bass was found guilty of first-degree murder and was sentenced to 27 years in prison.
