= Standard, Washington =

Ghost town in Washington (state)

Standard, Washington Green's Spur
- Ghost town
- Interactive map of Standard, Washington
- Coordinates: 48°44′38″N 122°12′5″W
- Country: United States
- State: Washington
- County: Whatcom
- Established: 1908
- Named for: Standard Lumber and Shingle Company
- Time zone: UTC-8 (Pacific (PST))
  - Summer (DST): UTC-7 (PDT)

Standard was a company town in south-western Whatcom County between Acme and Clipper along State Route 9 and the South Fork Nooksack River.

Like other towns in the South Fork Valley, Standard was established from a lumber company, and waned as the lumber industry did in the 1910s. The town was based around the Standard Lumber and Shingle Company.

== History ==
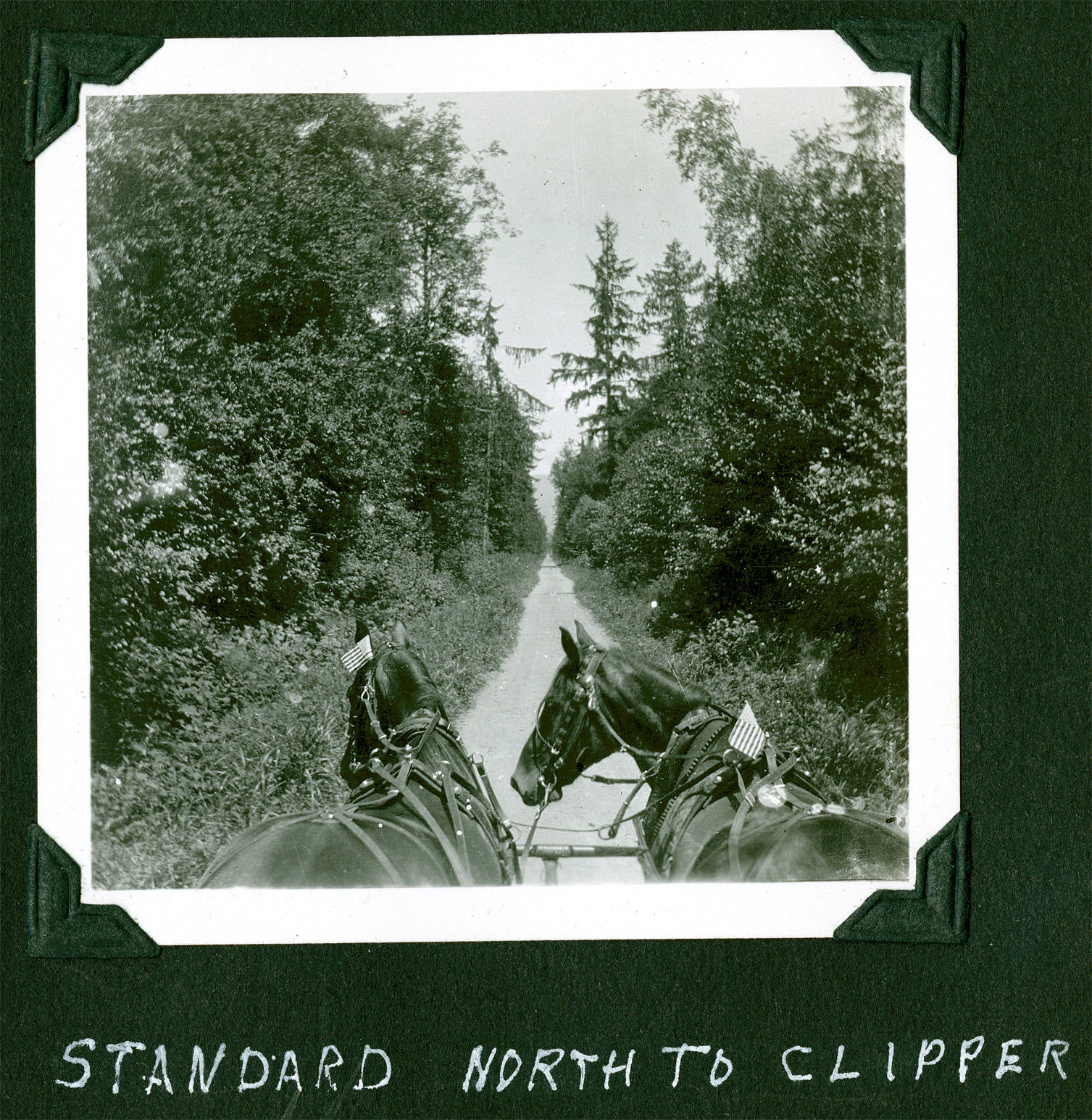
A view of Road 92, leading north to Clipper

Standard was built around the Seattle, Lake Shore and Eastern Railway. The area originally went by the name Green's Spur (referring to a spur line used by Northern Pacific Railway Company), however this was changed in 1908 by Orville M. Rosseau, general manager of the Standard Lumber and Shingle Company. Standard post office was established on July 9, 1908, and the first postmaster appointed was William W. Caskey. On the post office's application form the population in 1907 was listed at 200. In 1909 he was replaced as postmaster by Rosseau. At its peak in 1910 the town had a population of 375. The Standard Lumber and Shingle Company went bankrupt in 1913, and in 1916 Oscar S. White became postmaster and stayed until the post office was shut down in January 1920. By this point the population had dwindled to only 100, and over the following decades as the lumber industry moved away from the area the population dropped further.

A small number of people still live in the area, but the name Standard is no longer used and none of the original buildings still stand. While the area was marked as Standard on maps until at least 1971, today the only remaining references to the name are nearby Standard Road and Standard Creek.

== See also ==
- Clipper, Washington
- List of ghost towns in Washington
