= KAVZ-LP =

Low-power radio station in Deming, Washington

- Deming, Washington; United States
- Frequency: 102.5 MHz

Programming
- Format: Variety

Ownership
- Owner: Van Zandt Community Hall Association

History
- Former call signs: KNOO-LP (2004–2006)

Technical information
- Licensing authority: FCC
- Facility ID: 135120
- Class: L1
- ERP: 100 watts
- HAAT: -200.0 meters
- Transmitter coordinates: 48°47′23″N 122°11′20″W

Links
- Public license information: LMS
- Website: kavz.org

KAVZ-LP (102.5 FM) is a community radio station licensed to Deming, Washington, United States. The station is currently owned by Van Zandt Community Hall Association, and is run out of the historic community hall in the unincorporated community of Van Zandt, Washington.

The station serves the communities of Van Zandt, Acme, Deming, and Welcome, as well as other small rural communities in the area.

KAVZ-LP is run entirely by volunteers.

== History ==
The station went on the air as KNOO-LP on June 4, 2004. On August 5, 2006, the station changed its call sign to the current KAVZ-LP.

== See also ==
- List of community radio stations in the United States
