= Clipper, Washington =

Unincorporated community in Washington, US

- Unincorporated community
- Location within Washington (state)
- Coordinates: 48°45′36″N 122°12′08″W
- Country: United States
- State: Washington
- County: Whatcom
- Established: 1901
- Elevation: 256 ft (78 m)
- Time zone: UTC-8 (Pacific (PST))
  - Summer (DST): UTC-7 (PDT)
- Area code(s): 360, 564
- GNIS feature ID: 1517866

Clipper is an unincorporated community in Whatcom County, in Washington. The community took its name from the Clipper Shingle Company.

== History ==
Clipper was originally home to a large Polish population, many originally having come to the area to be a part of a colony designed specifically for Polish people to live together, called Rapperswyll.

Potential Polish settlers were offered plots of land for $500 (equivalent to $19,000 in 2025). They paid only one-third upfront, with the remainder to be repaid through work for the Rapperswyll Colony Company upon arrival. Anthony Klawitor was the president of the company, and Peter Zobrist, who was Swiss, was the secretary. The colony was located south of Standard, and a town was planned, but after the colony failed to grow they moved north and to the place that became Clipper. According to Leo Sygitowicz, a Clipper resident, in a 1982 newspaper, "more than 75 percent of Clipper residents were of Polish descent at one time."

Clipper was named in 1900 by two employees of the Clipper Shingle Company, James Peterson and James A. McDonald. Clipper was built around the logging industry, and Clipper Shingle Company was among the major employers in the town.

A post office was established on March 5, 1901, with John Glineski as the first postmaster, and remained in operation until February 28, 1955. Clipper established a school district in 1889, breaking off from the Saxon School District. The school served children from Van Zandt as well as children in Clipper. In 1937 it consolidated with Acme and then in 1941 it became part of the Mount Baker School District.

== See also ==
- Van Zandt, Washington
- Standard, Washington
- List of unincorporated communities in Washington
