= Whatcom Creek =

River in Washington, United States

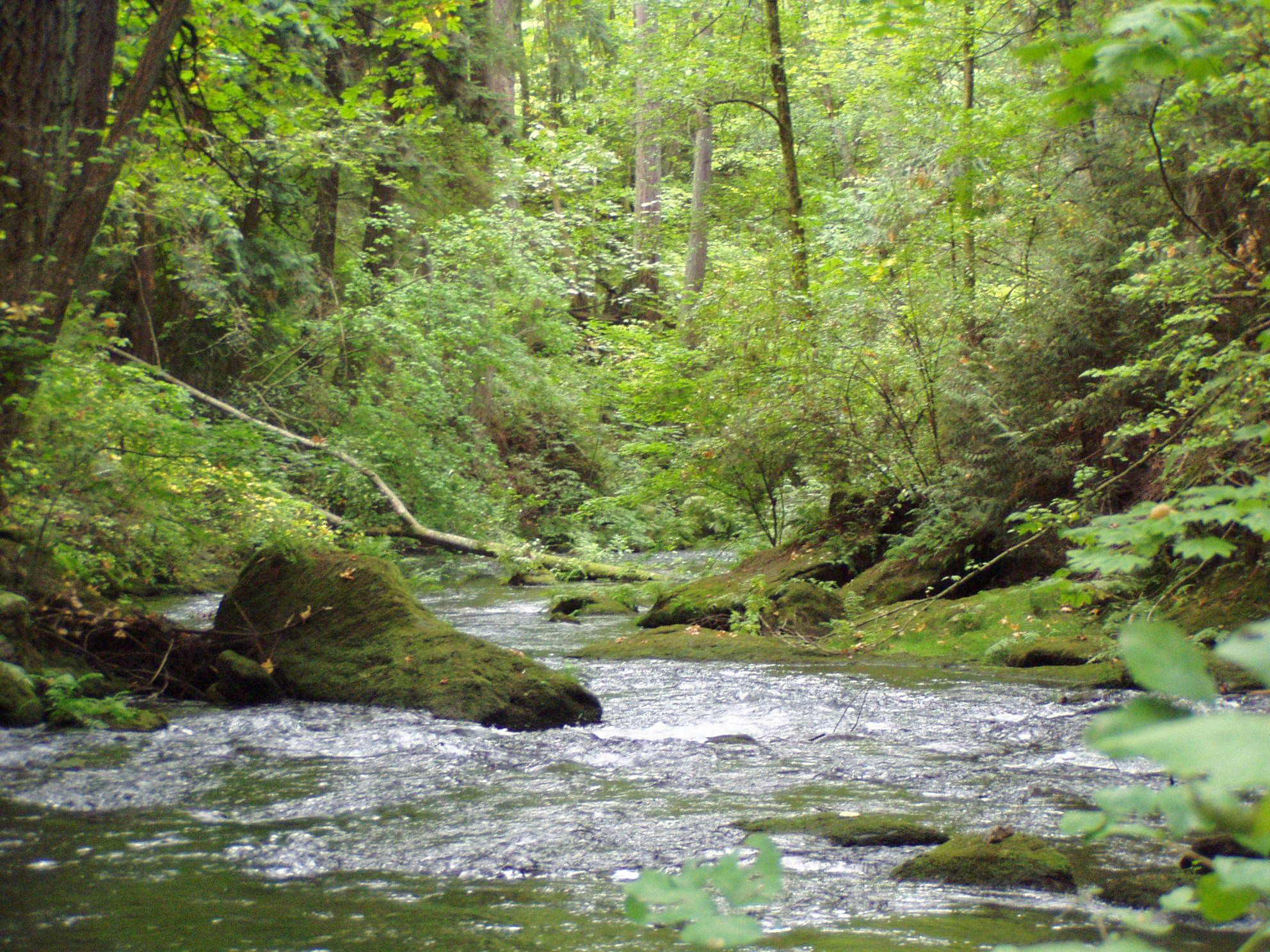
- Whatcom Creek in Whatcom Falls Park

Physical characteristics
- Source
  - location: Lake Whatcom, Bellingham, Washington
  - coordinates: 48°45′28″N 122°25′16″W
  - elevation: 328 ft (100 m)
- Mouth
  - location: Whatcom Creek Waterway, Bellingham Bay
  - coordinates: 48°45′11″N 122°29′05″W
  - elevation: 16 ft (4.9 m)

Basin features
- Progression: Whatcom Creek → Whatcom Creek Waterway → Bellingham Bay
- GNIS ID: 1509442

Whatcom Creek (North Straits Salish: X̌’wótqwem /χˈʔwotqəm/) is a waterway in Bellingham, Washington, United States.

Approximately 4 miles (6.4 km) long, it drains Lake Whatcom through Whatcom Falls Park and through the city of Bellingham to Bellingham Bay. The creek starts at the control dam for Lake Whatcom, in Whatcom Falls Park, where the creek goes over many falls, from about 350 feet (110 m) to about 80 feet above sea level. It flows across a short plain to downtown Bellingham and over the falls where the first lumber mill that was powered by the falls was built in 1854.

When two men, Henry Roeder and Mr. Peabody, went looking for a falls to power a sawmill back in the early 1850s, they learned of a creek up north that the Indians called Whatcom. In the local lingo this meant "noisy waters" by some accounts. The men canoed to Bellingham Bay and found a fairly large creek tumbling over a 35-foot fall and founded their mill. This was the start of the city of Bellingham.

The creek has a small fishery, with trout and salmon, but only minors are allowed to fish above the falls. During the fall, a large group of people fish below the falls, and large salmon can be spotted jumping the falls.

== Olympic pipeline explosion ==
On June 10, 1999, a gasoline pipeline operated by Olympic Pipe Line Company that passes over Whatcom Creek split a seam and dumped about 277,000 gallons into the creek, which then exploded. Before the explosion, an 18-year-old who was fly fishing on the creek was overcome with the noxious fumes and drowned. Minutes after the young man drowned, two 10-year-olds were caught in the explosion of the gasoline. Both boys died from severe burns the following day. After the fire, the Olympic Pipe Line Company pleaded guilty to a felony and paid $112 million in fines.

== Course ==
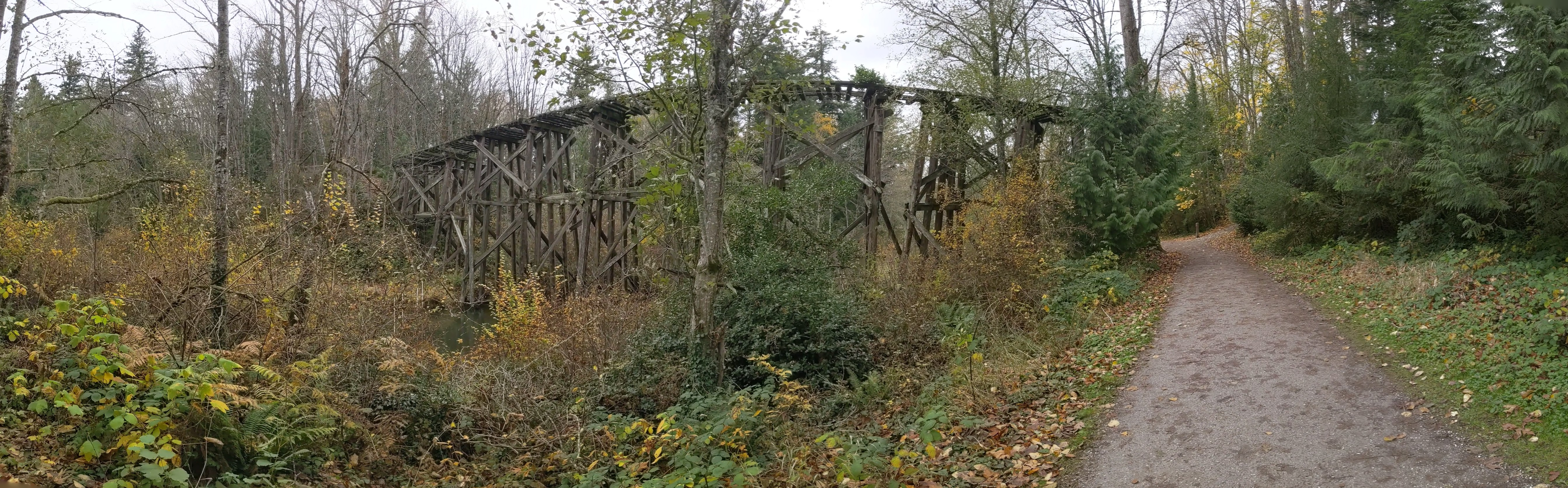
The old railroad trestle across the creek, just below Lake Whatcom, in Whatcom Falls Park
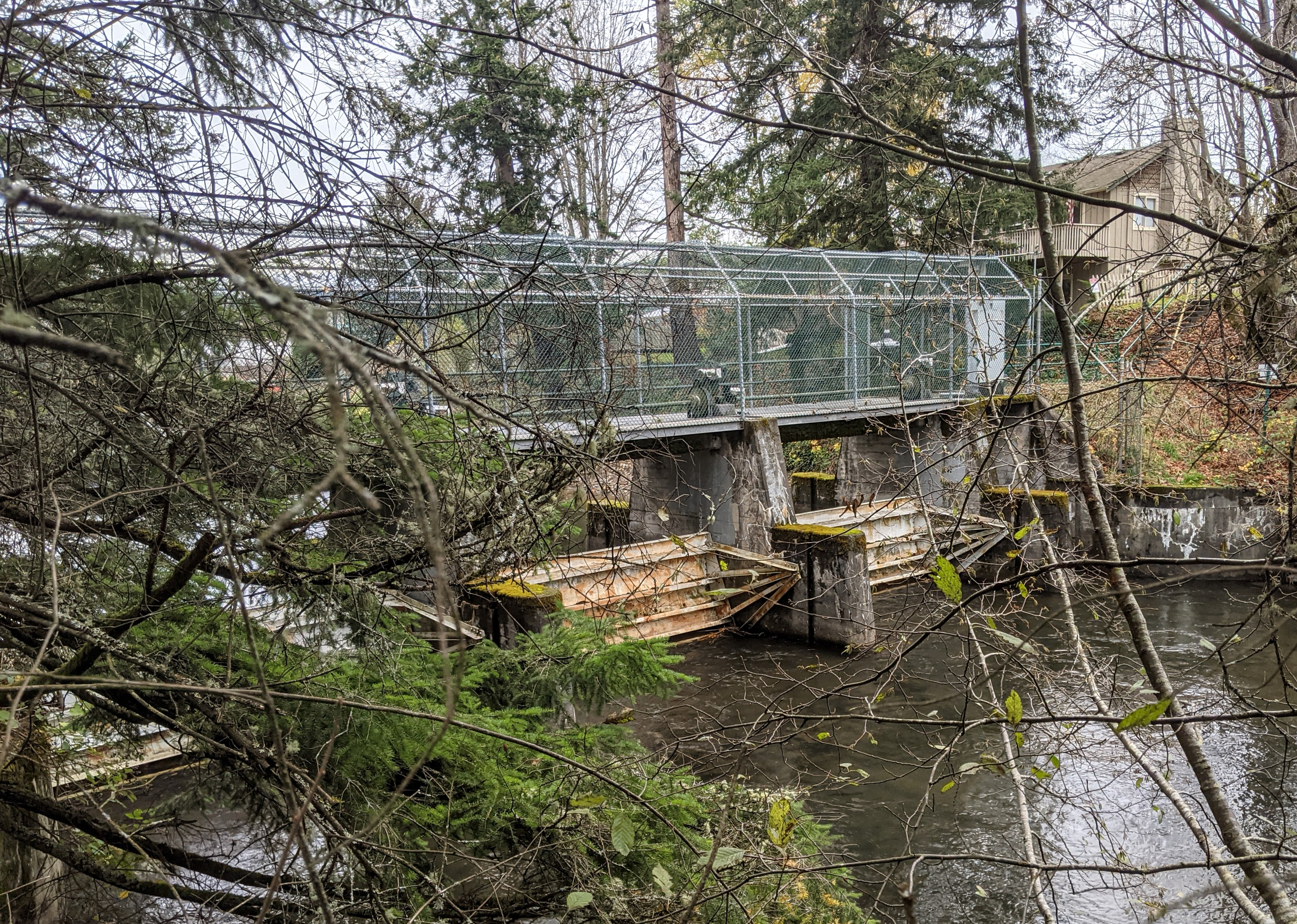
The Lake Whatcom control dam gates at the head of the creek

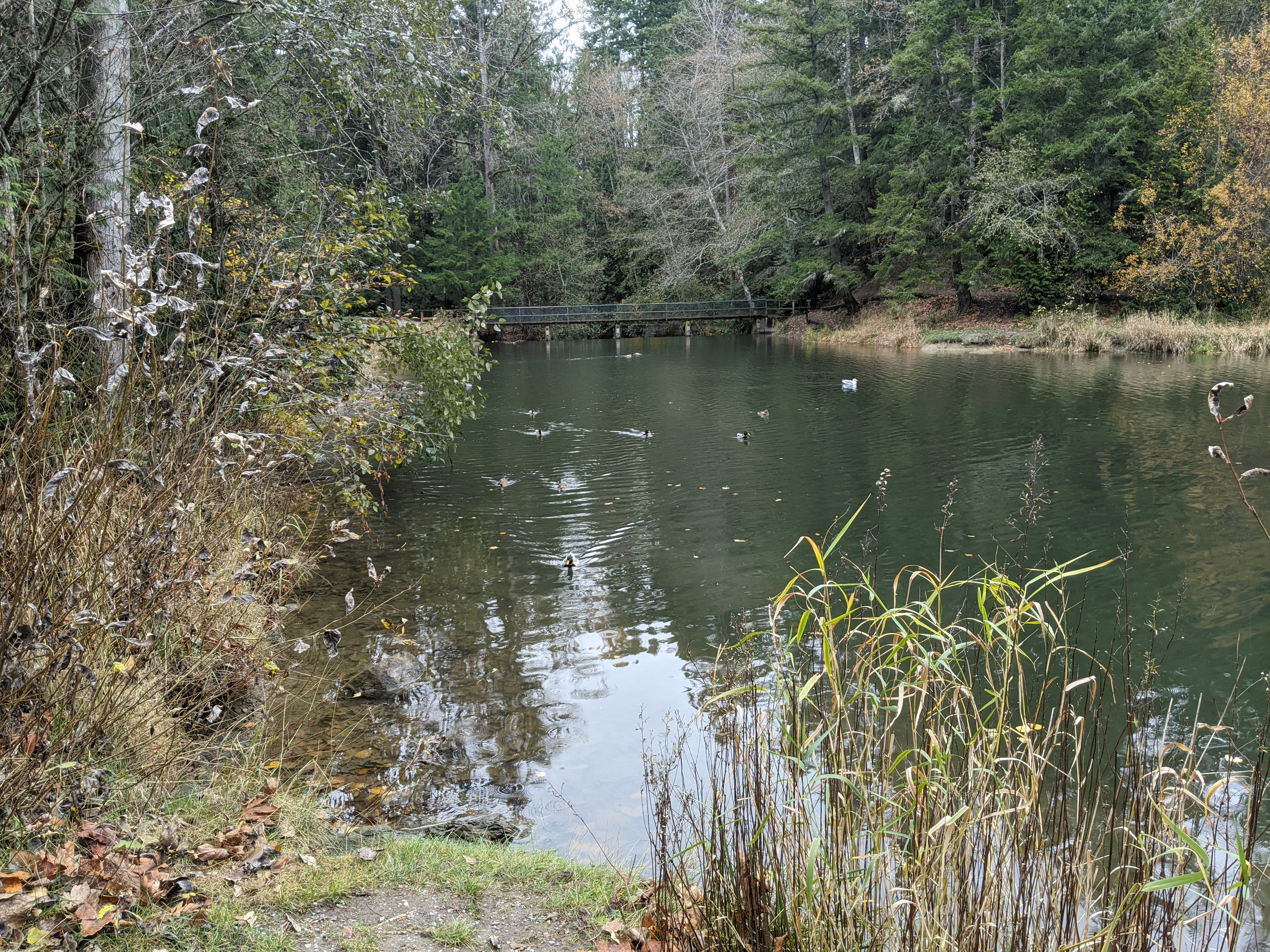
Derby Pond, where water is diverted to the fish hatchery

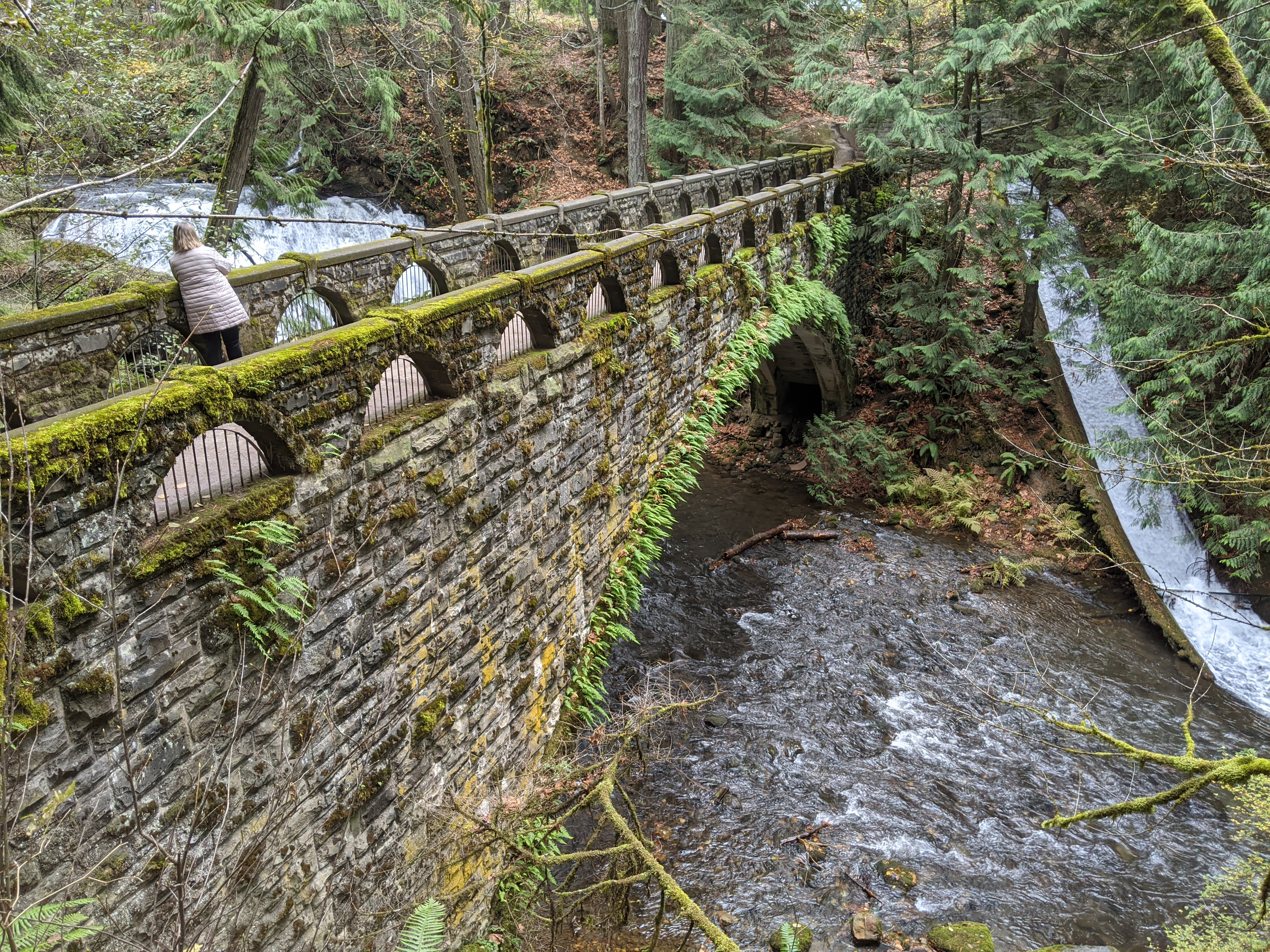
The 1939–40 WPA stone bridge across the creek, with main falls above it

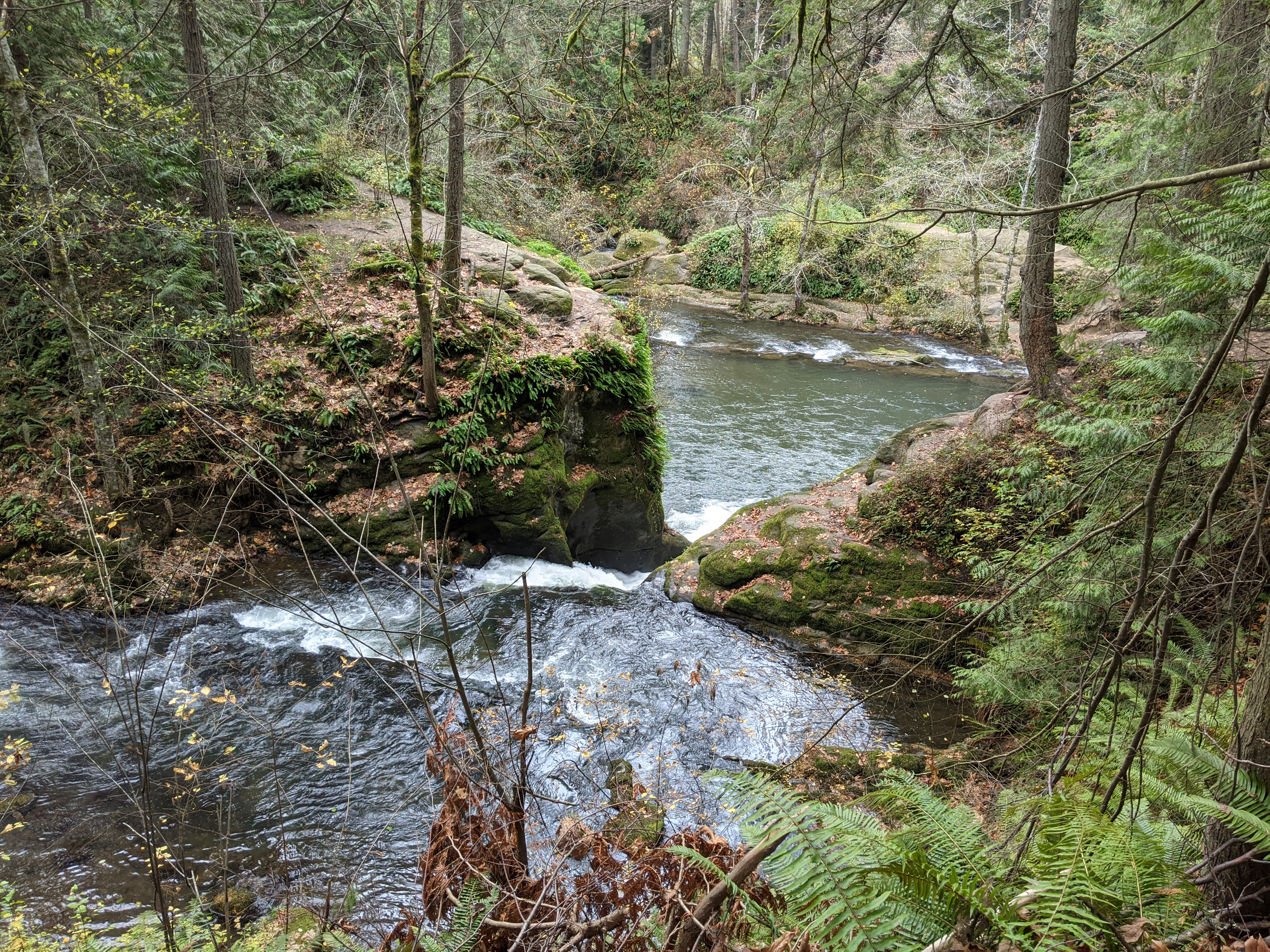
A minor waterfall below the bridge

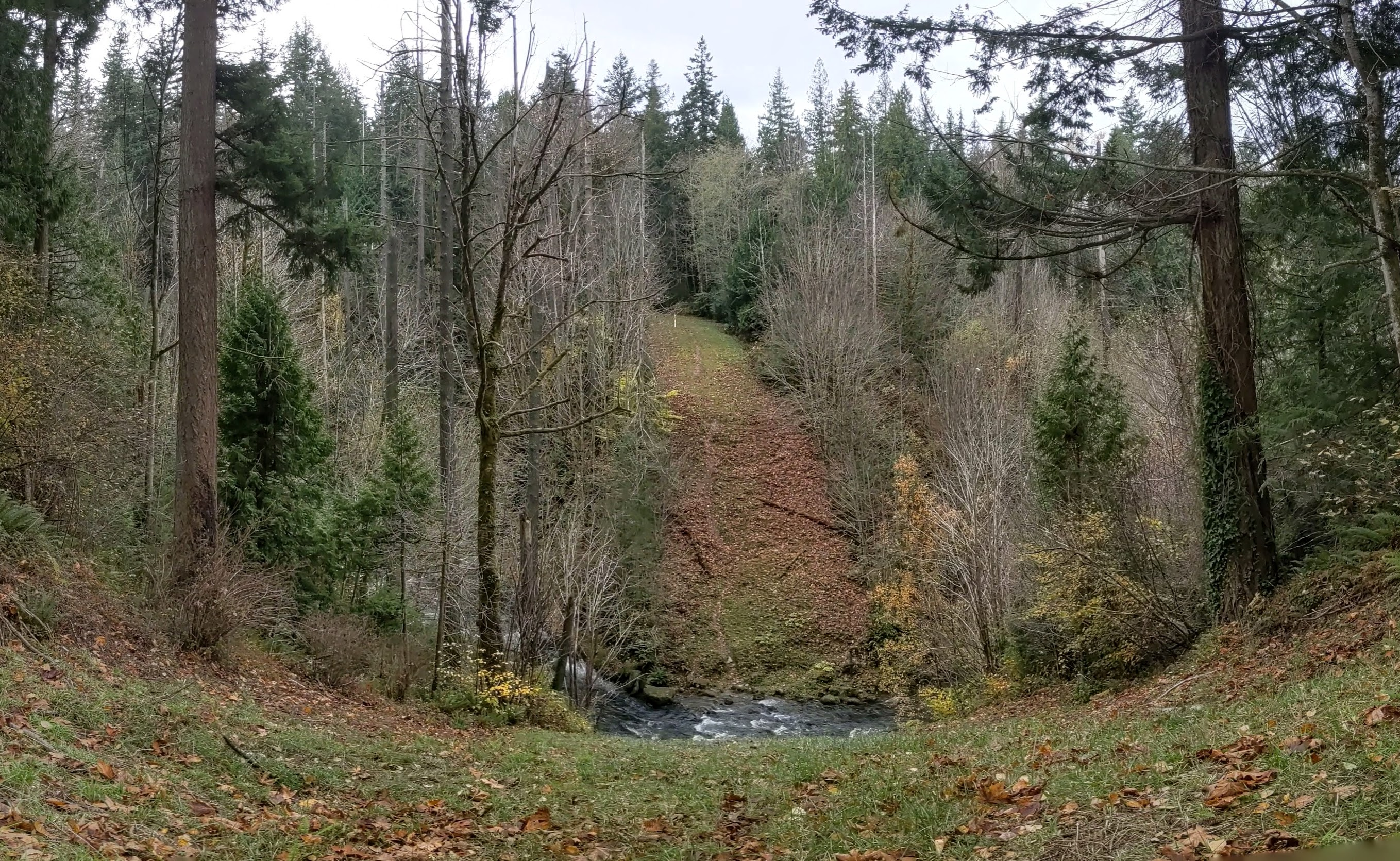
The creek valley in the sensitive area that is still recovering in 2020 from the 1999 explosion

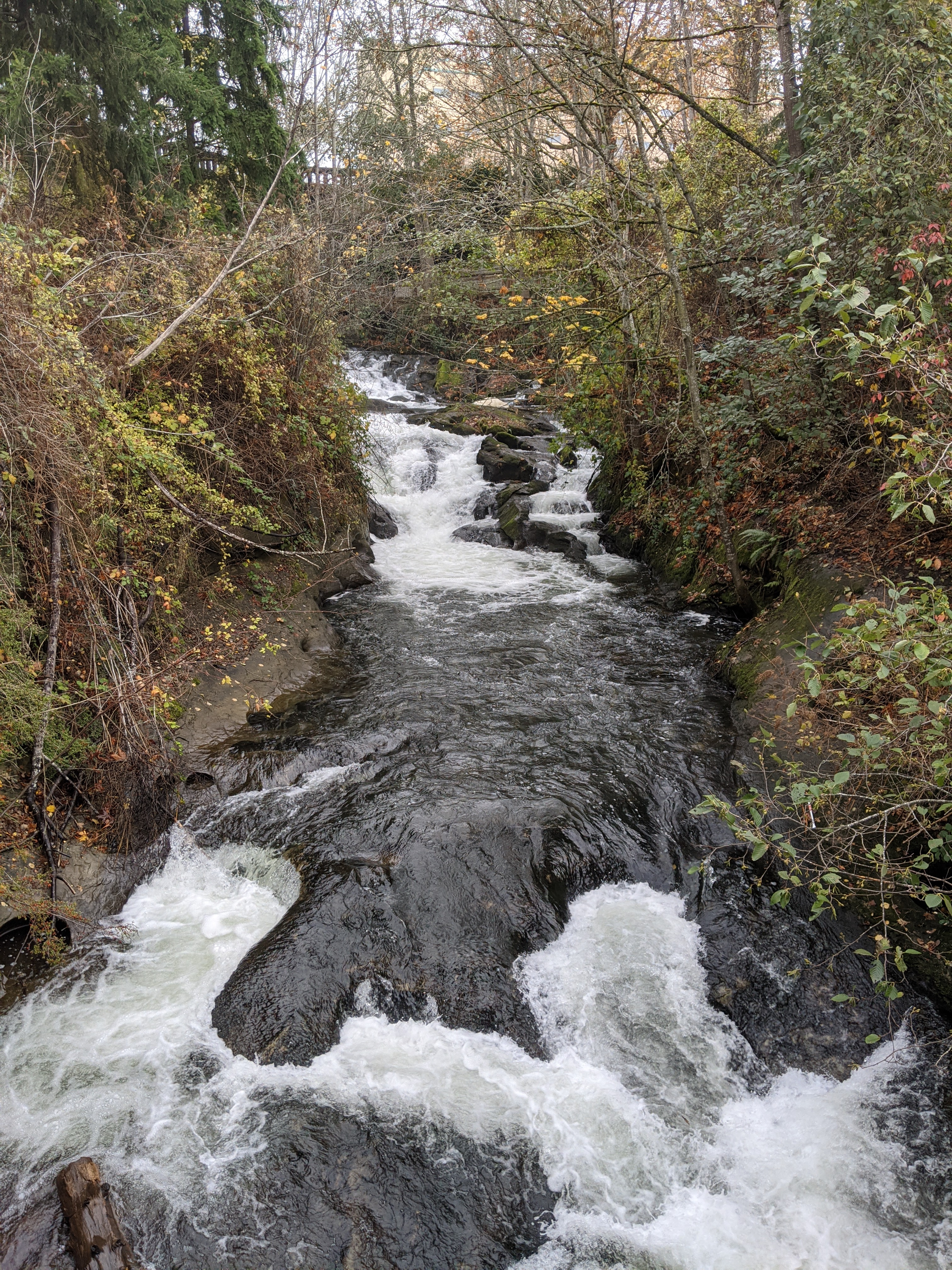
The lower falls, in downtown Bellingham
