= Camp Firwood =

Christian summer camp in Washington, US

Coordinates: 48.713944°N 122.311842°W

Camp Firwood is a Christian summer camp situated on Lake Whatcom, southeast of Bellingham, Washington. It is part of "The Firs", a Christian camp and retreat ministry that is in good standing with the Christian Camp and Conference Association.

== Overview ==
=== History ===
Camp Firwood was founded by Otis and Julia Whipple, who gathered 35 people for a five-day retreat at their property overlooking Lake Whatcom in July 1921. This was the start of what would become a multi-site, multi-program organization now called "The Firs". In 1954, a group of 30 Junior High campers paddling on Lake Whatcom landed on a camp site which they called "White Sands". With the permission of the property owner, the first week-long resident camp took place on this 80-acre (32 ha) property, which soon become known as Camp Firwood. In 1955, Camp Firwood was purchased for $35,000.

Today, Camp Firwood runs a summer camp for youth 7–18 years of age, and houses up to 260 campers a week. The camp now encompasses 118 acres (48 ha) of beautiful forest, 4,500 feet (1,400 m) of waterfront, and its own private island. They host day camps and resident camps, both of which are co-ed. In 2010, they opened a new 12,000-square-foot (1,100 m^{2}) dining hall, dubbed the Centerhouse, to more adequately accommodate the growing number of campers.

Also in 2010, the camp finished in the Top 5 for "Best Fun Place for Kids in Western Washington" by King5's Evening Magazine.

=== Activities ===
Although its main attractions are at the waterfront, Camp Firwood also hosts a variety of other activities including paintball, laser tag, arts and crafts, a state-of-the-art high ropes challenge course, a 20 ft (6.1 m) climbing center, archery range, soccer field, basketball court, 3.8 ft (1.2 m) and a beach volleyball court. Water activities include wake surfing, swimming beach, two aqua jump trampolines, an aqua swing, kayaking, canoeing, sailing, waterskiing, wakeboarding, and tubing. They also have a "blob."
