= Olympic pipeline explosion =

1999 accident in Washington state, USA

Coordinates: 48.7521°N 122.4331°W

Olympic Pipeline explosion
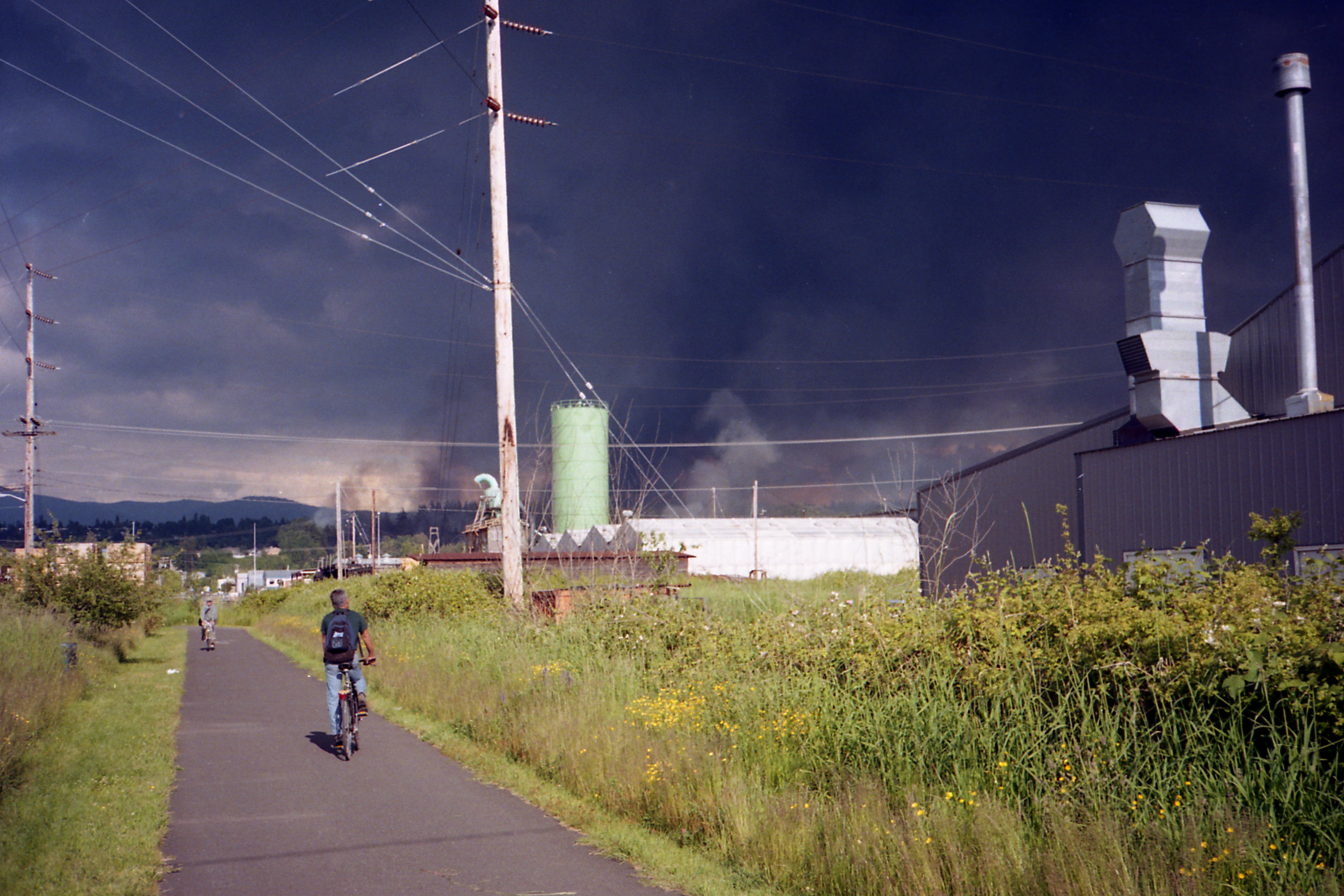
- Smoke above the fire
- Date: June 10, 1999
- Time: 04:55 p.m. PT
- Location: Whatcom Falls Park, Bellingham, Washington, U.S.
- Deaths: 3

On June 10, 1999, the Olympic pipeline operated by Olympic Pipeline Company, carrying gasoline at the time, ruptured within Whatcom Falls Park in Bellingham, Washington, United States, spilling flammable liquid which later ignited. The disaster began at 3:25 p.m. PDT (22:25 UTC) when an underground gasoline pipeline crossing Whatcom and Hannah Creeks suffered a mechanical failure. The incident was caused by a series of errors and malfunctions involving Olympic Pipeline, compounded by an excavator's failure to call in and locate a damaged section. The gasoline vapors ignited at 5:02 p.m. PDT, sending a wave of fire down Whatcom Creek. Three people died in the incident.

== Background ==
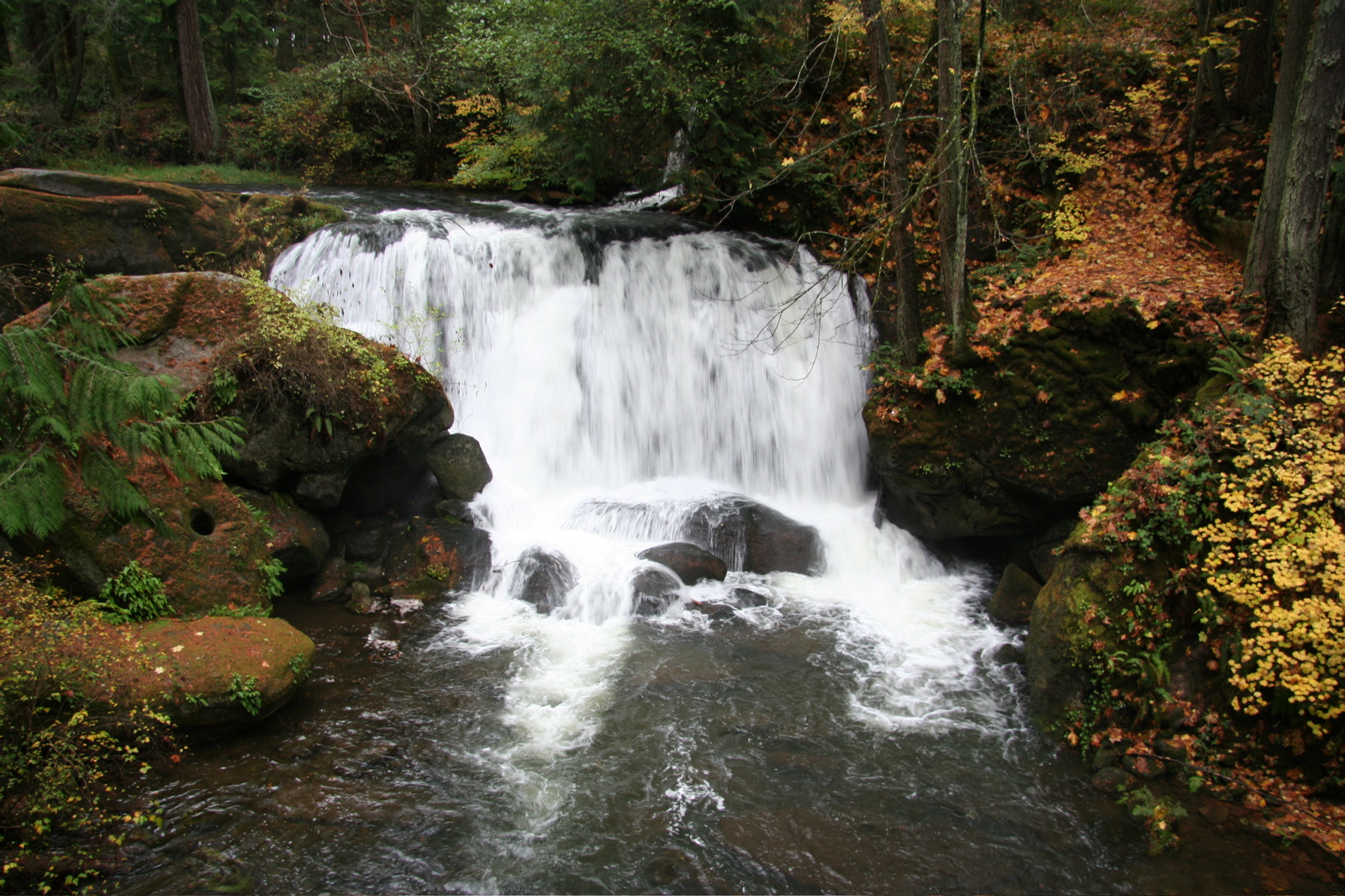
Whatcom Falls Park

Olympic Pipe Line Company ran a network of fuel pipes beginning at refineries in Whatcom County and Anacortes and running south to Seattle and Portland. In 1999, the pipeline was owned and operated by Equilon, a joint venture between Shell Oil and Texaco. As of 2006, the pipeline is 65% owned by Enbridge and 35% owned by BP.

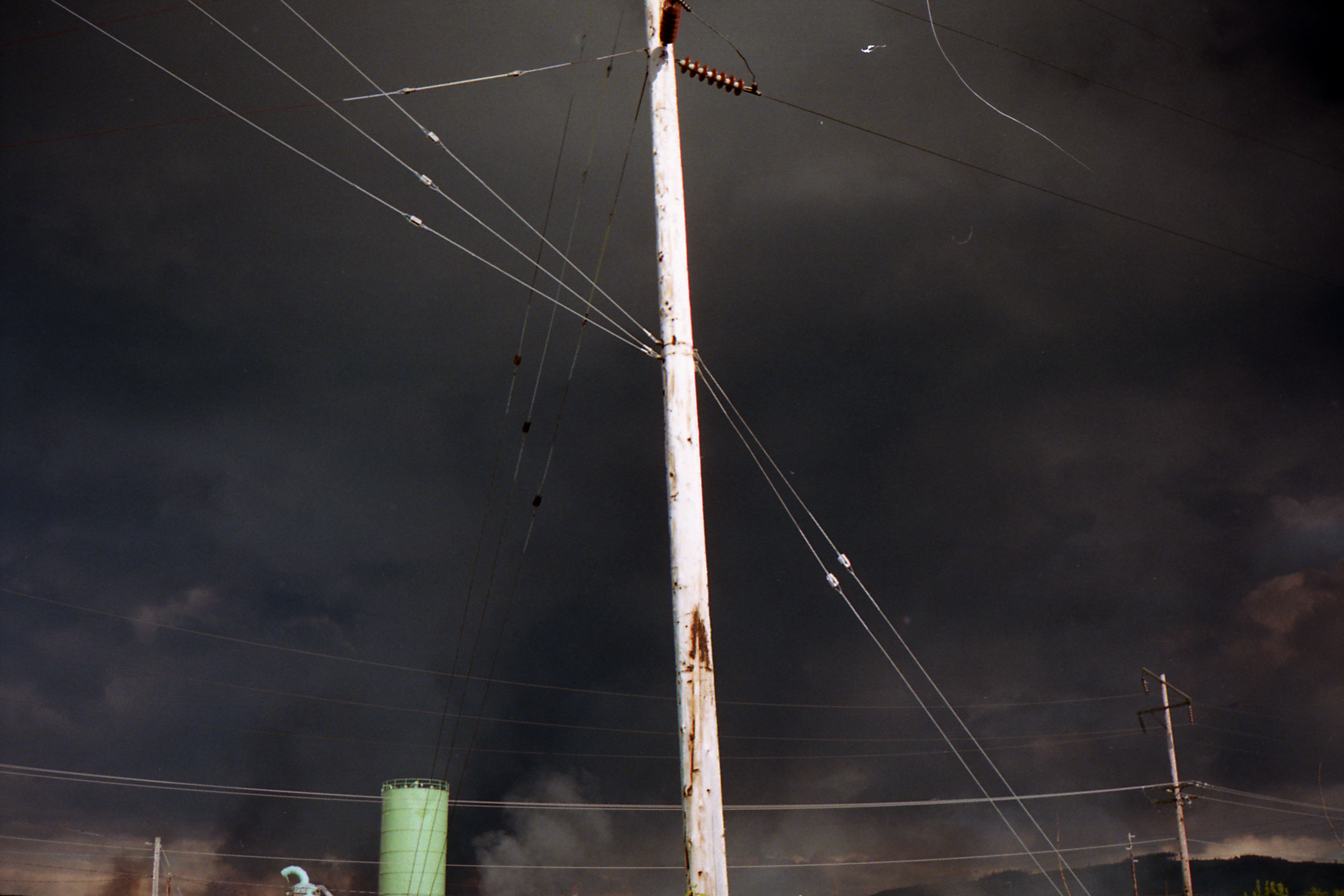
Smoke above the fire on June 10, 1999 shortly after the explosion

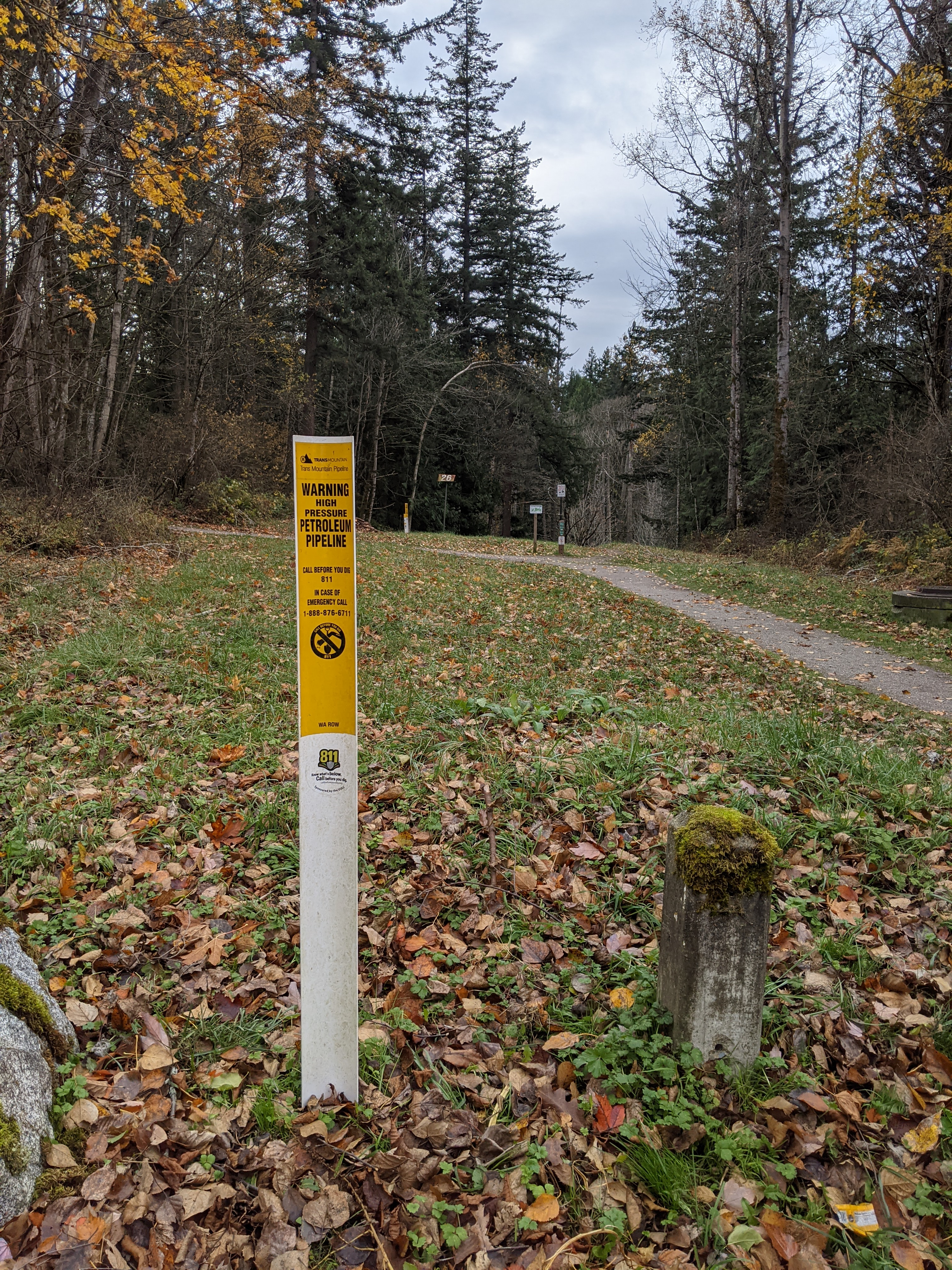
A petroleum pipeline warning by the creek in 2020

== Disaster ==
The disaster began as Olympic Pipeline was transporting gasoline from Cherry Point Refinery to terminals in Seattle and Portland, Oregon. A pressure relief valve that was improperly configured failed to open in the 16-inch (410 mm) pipeline, which resulted in a surge of pressure after an automatic valve shut for unknown reasons. This resulted in the line rupturing at 3:25 that afternoon, and gasoline began spilling into Hannah Creek just above its confluence with Whatcom Creek. As the gasoline continued to spill, many people in the area called 9-1-1 to report the gasoline smell, and an Olympic Pipeline employee who was in the area called the company to inquire whether they had an anomaly.

When the Bellingham Fire Department arrived, massive amounts of gasoline had turned the creek pink, and the fumes were overwhelming. The fire department notified Olympic Pipeline of the leak and evacuated the area around the creek.

The gasoline ignited at 5:02 p.m. The black smoke plume extended to an altitude of 30,000 feet (9,100 m) and the smoke from the explosion was visible from Vancouver to Anacortes. The fire exceeded 2,000 °F (1,090 °C). Local businesses were evacuated, Interstate 5 was closed to traffic, and the Coast Guard stopped maritime traffic in Bellingham Bay in anticipation of the fire travelling the entire length of the creek. However, the fire never extended past Interstate 5.

Emergency responders stopped most of the fires by 6:30 p.m.; the smoke dissipated by 7:00.

== Victims ==
Three people died in the incident. The first was Liam Wood, 18, who was fly fishing in the creek. He was rendered unconscious by the fumes and fell into the creek, drowning before the explosion. Two children, Wade King and Stephen Tsiorvas, both ten years old, were playing near the creek confluence during the incident. Both survived the fire, but sustained severe burns, dying the next day at Harborview Medical Center in Seattle. There were eight related injuries. King's parents donated $400,000 to the Bellingham School District, and in 2007 Wade King Elementary School was named in his memory.

== Damage ==
Property damage was estimated at $58,455,927, most of it caused by the explosion. Many nearby buildings had broken windows. One house was completely destroyed. The city's water treatment plant was near the explosion site, and while the building itself survived, everything inside was destroyed. The rupture allowed 277,000 US gal (1.05 million L) of gasoline to escape into the creek bed. Bellingham water treatment personnel were forced to manually add water treatment chemicals to keep the water supply safe until the plant could be rebuilt.

Authorities all noted that the destruction and death toll were much lower than would be expected from such a large explosion. This was due to the explosion being centered in a large, forested park; the fires mostly staying in Whatcom Creek; and the ignition occurring before more gasoline had leaked, which would have resulted in a much larger explosion. The cause of ignition was determined by Bellingham Fire Dept. to be a butane lighter in the possession of King and Tsiorvas.

== Investigation ==
After a three-year investigation, investigators pointed to a series of failures, and not just a single error, most of which were the fault of Olympic Pipeline. Olympic Pipeline had failed to properly train employees and had to contend with a faulty computer SCADA system and pressure relief valve. In 1994, five years before the accident, an IMCO Construction crew, working on behalf of the City of Bellingham, damaged the pipeline while constructing the city's water treatment plant and failed to notify officials about the damage. Subsequently, Olympic Pipeline failed to find or repair the damage.

Olympic, Equilon and several employees faced a seven-count indictment after the investigation in 2002. The companies pleaded guilty to several of the charges, leading to a $112 million settlement, a record at the time. This was the first conviction against a pipeline company under the 1979 Hazardous Liquid Pipeline Safety Act.

== Recovery ==
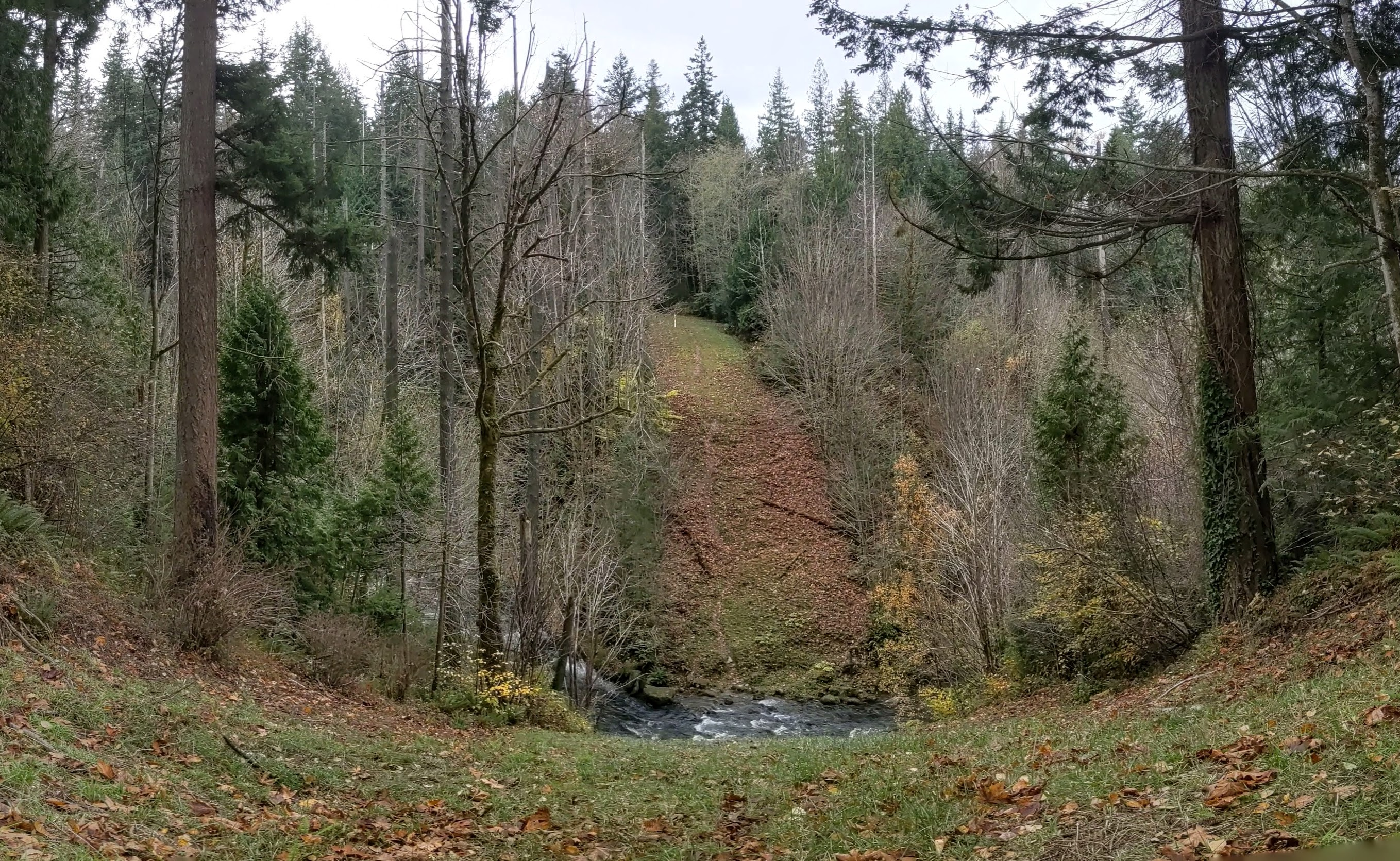
Whatcom Creek sensitive area, recovering in 2020, with a few dead trees still standing, near the end of St. Clair Street

The Whatcom Falls Park in 2020 describes much of the area around the creek as "sensitive due to hazardous trees and for forest recovery from 1999 pipeline explosion."

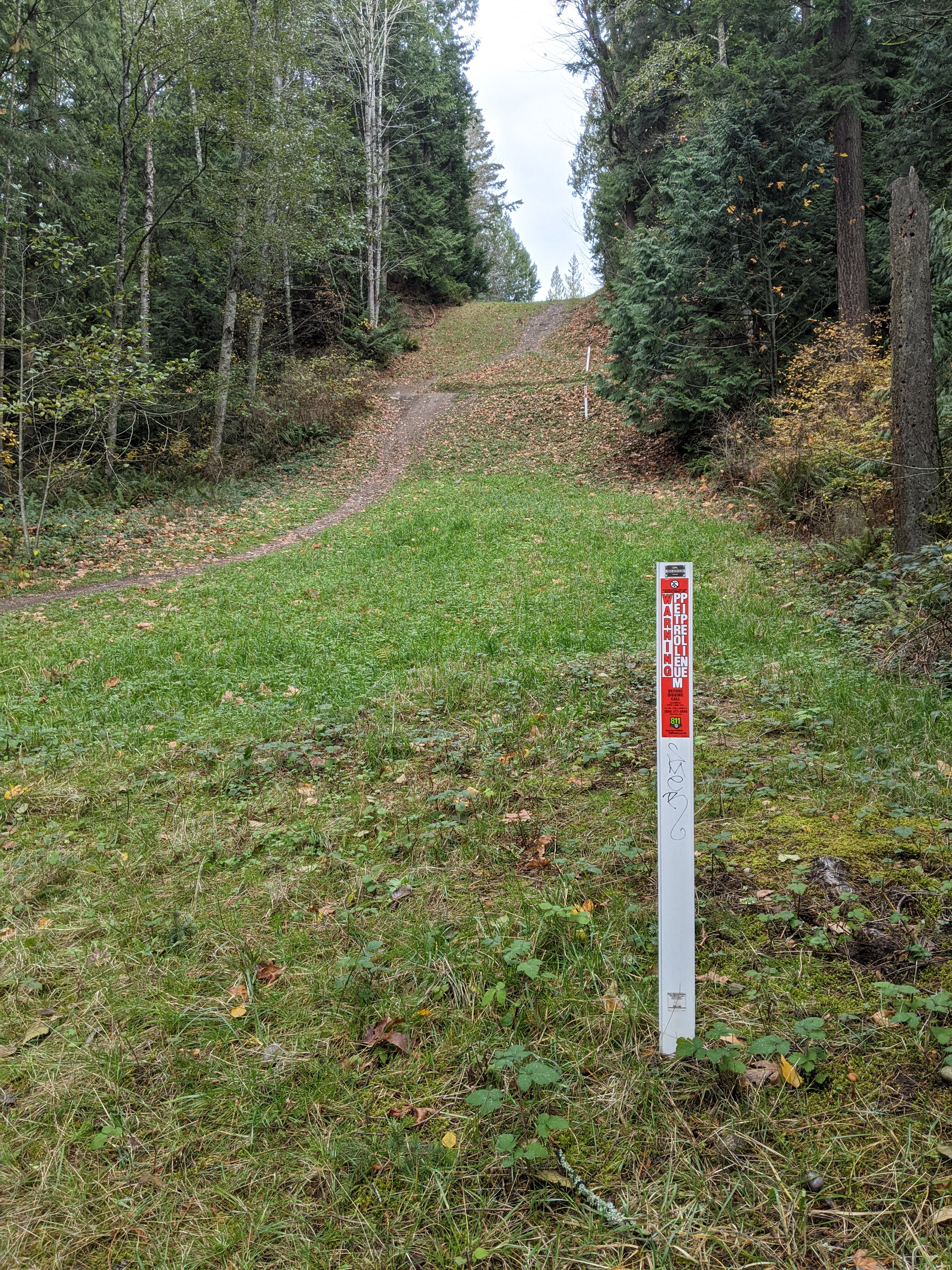
Another petroleum pipeline warning by the creek in 2020

== Bibliography ==
Notes

References

- McClary, Daryl C. (June 11, 2003). "Olympic Pipe Line accident in Bellingham kills three youths on June 10, 1999". historylink.org.
- "2000: BP Pipelines Operates Olympic Pipe Line". BP p.l.c.
- Millage, Kira (June 7, 2009). "Timeline of Bellingham pipeline explosion". The Bellingham Herald.
- Watts, John (n.d.). "A Decade of Healing". Pipeline Safety Trust.
- Gaard, Greta Claire (2007). The Nature of Home: Taking Root in a Place (2007 ed.). University of Arizona Press. ISBN 9780816525768. - Total pages: 213
- Washington Military Department – Emergency Management Division (2013). "Local Hazard – Pipeline". Washington Military Department – Emergency Management Division.
- "Incident on June 10, 1999". ProPublica.
