= Whatcom Falls Park =

Park in Bellingham, Washington, United States

Coordinates: 48.7521°N 122.4331°W

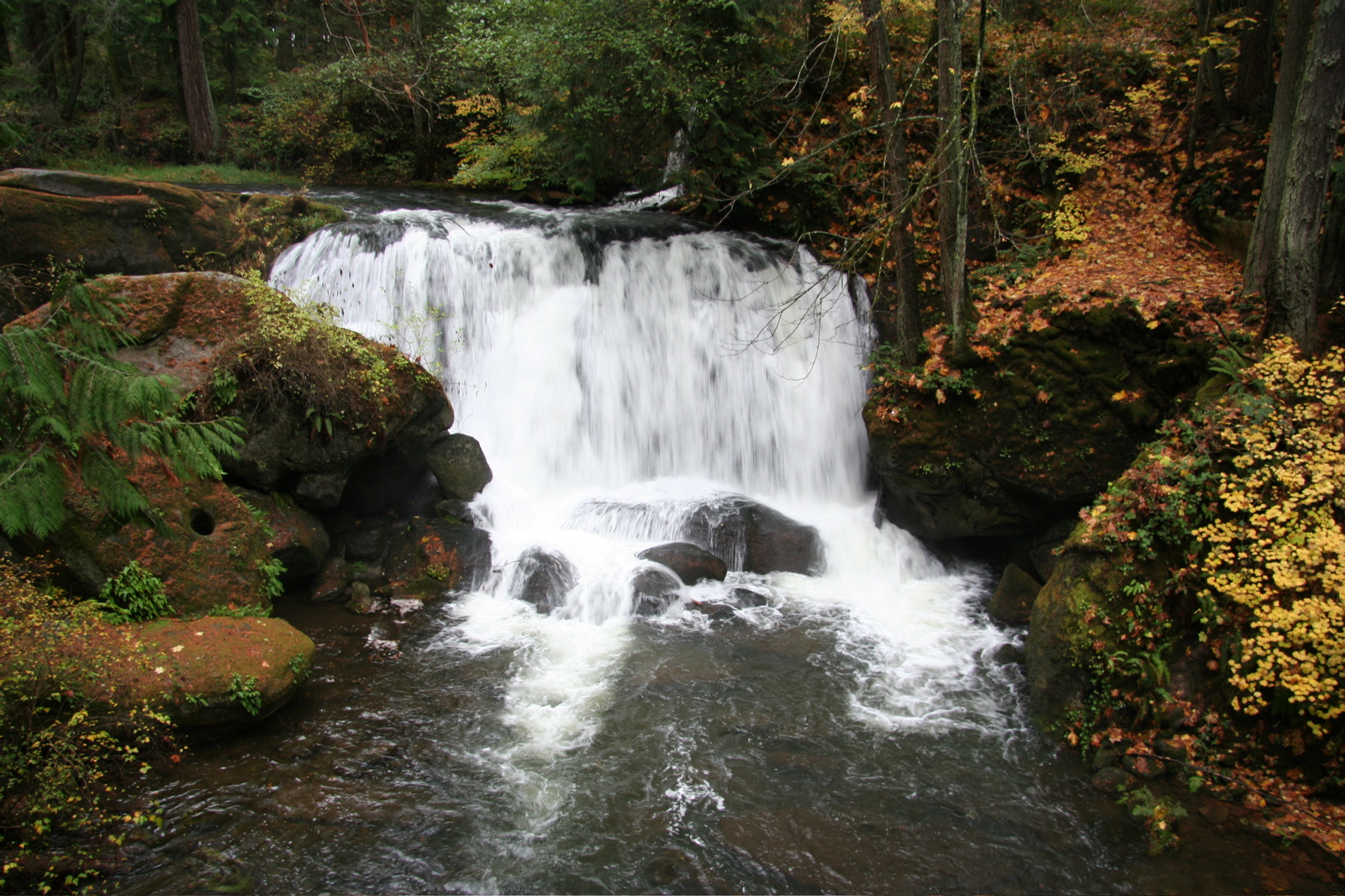
- Whatcom Falls from atop the stone bridge.
- Interactive map of Whatcom Falls Park
- Location: Bellingham, Washington
- Area: 241 acres (98 ha)

Whatcom Falls Park is a 241-acre (0.98 km^{2}) park in Bellingham, Washington, United States. The falls are on Whatcom Creek, which leads from Lake Whatcom to Bellingham Bay. The park has four sets of waterfalls and several miles of well maintained walking trails.

Other features include:

- Fishing pond – children 14 and under only.
- Two Tennis courts (upper parking lot)
- Athletic fields (upper parking lot)
- Picnic tables and shelters can be rented from the parks department office.
- Two playgrounds – one at each the upper and lower parking lots
- Whatcom Falls pump track

Bellingham Technical College operates a trout hatchery within the park on behalf of the Washington State Department of Fish and Wildlife.

== Whirlpool Falls ==
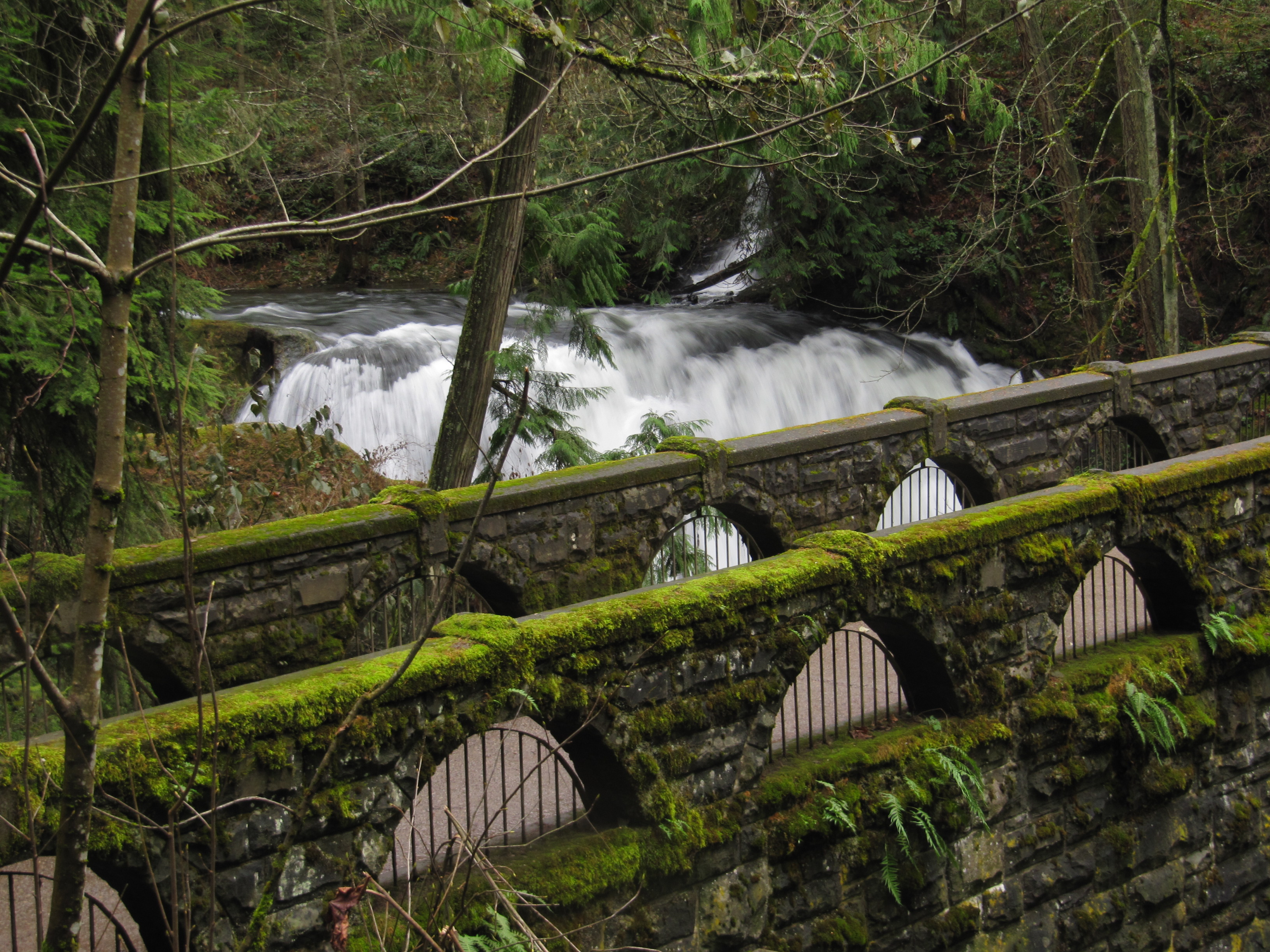
An old stone bridge in the park with moss and ferns.

Whirlpool Falls is a very popular swimming hole within the park. The falls themselves are only about ten feet in height but the cliffs adjacent to the falls reach to about 30 feet (9.1 m) high. During the summer one can usually watch swimmers jumping from these tall cliffs into the punchbowl pool below. The falls are located along the "Whirlpool Loop Trail."

Swimming at these falls was outlawed for a number of years following the pipeline disaster, of which damage is visible from popular cliffs. After various signs warning swimmers from entering, and fences meant to keep them out were destroyed, the city gave up regulating the area and removed all warnings and barriers.

These falls are frequently referred to incorrectly as Middle Whatcom Falls or Lower Whatcom Falls. Middle falls is located down creek near the western edge of the park and not reachable by trail. The area surrounding the middle falls was devastated by the Olympic pipeline explosion and is off limits to the public. The lower falls are actually located a couple miles downstream just above the estuary at Maritime Heritage Park.

== Pipeline disaster ==
On June 10, 1999, the Olympic pipeline (of the Olympic Pipe Line Company) ruptured in the park near Whatcom Creek, leaking 237,000 US gallons (897 m³) of gasoline into the creek. The massive amount of fuel was inadvertently ignited and the resulting explosion burned significant forest land within the park. A young man and two boys died as a result.

== See also ==
- Bellingham history
