= Lake Whatcom =

Lake in Whatcom County, Washington, United States

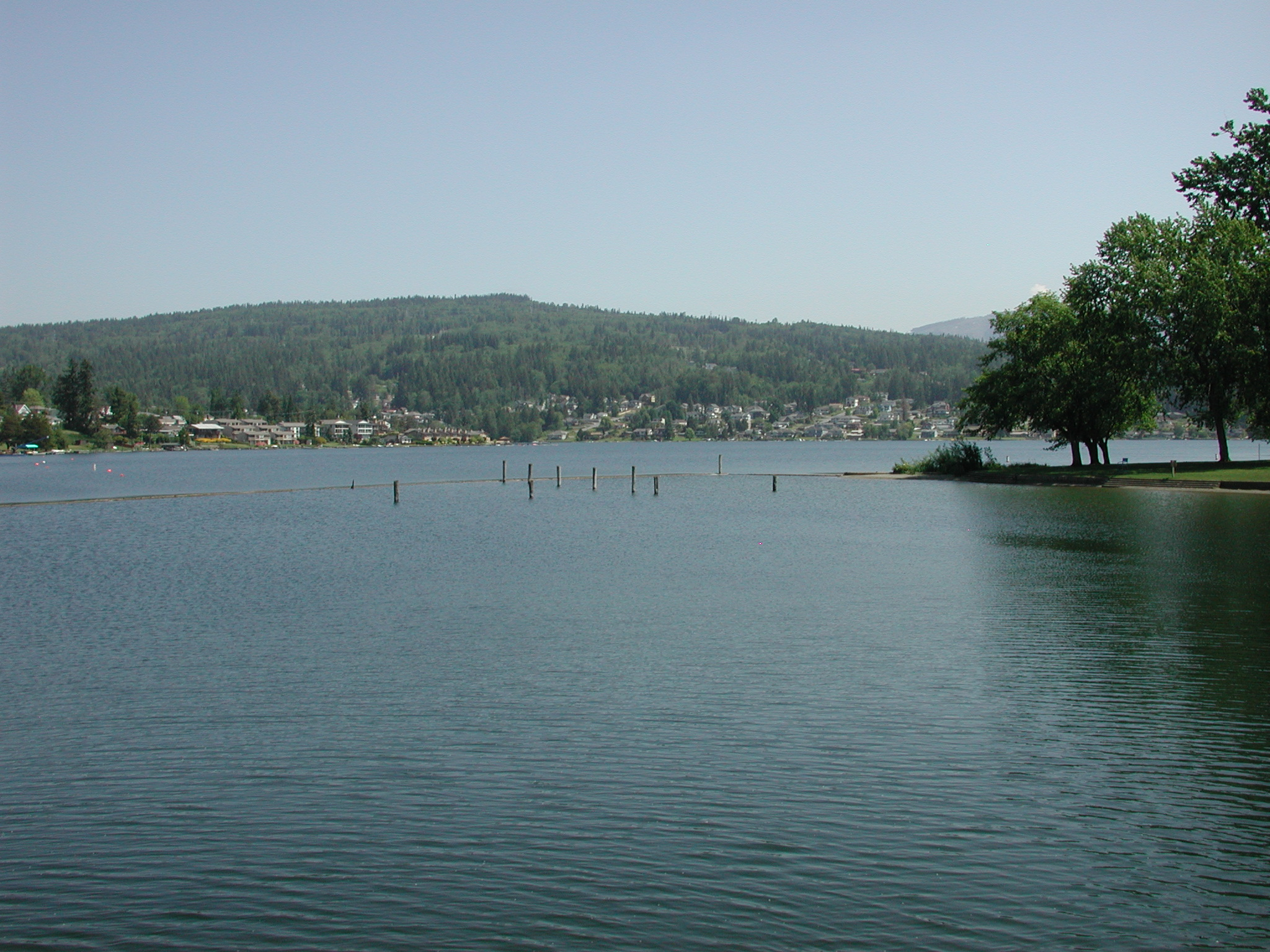

- Location within Washington (state) Location within the United States
- Location: Whatcom County, Washington
- Coordinates: 48°43′59″N 122°19′41″W
- Primary outflows: Whatcom Creek
- Catchment area: 145 km^{2} (56 sq mi)
- Basin countries: United States
- Max. length: 10.5 mi (16.9 km)
- Max. depth: 350 ft (110 m)
- Surface elevation: 314 ft (96 m)
- Islands: 1 (Reveille Island)

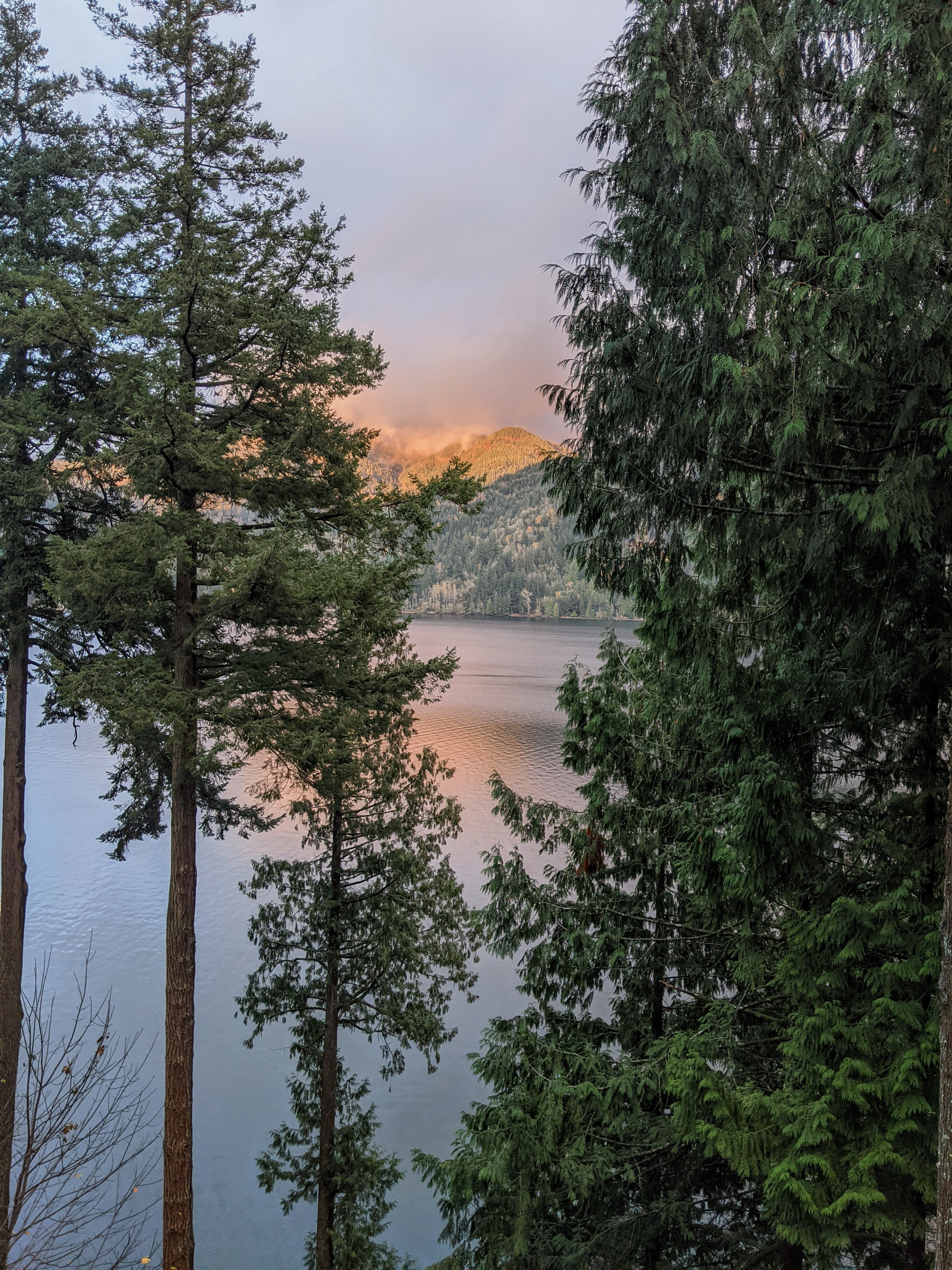
Lake Whatcom golden hour view from a home in the Sudden Valley neighborhood

Lake Whatcom (from the Lummi word for "loud water") is located in Whatcom County, Washington, United States. It is the drinking water source for approximately 85,000 residents in the city of Bellingham as well as Whatcom County. It is approximately 10 miles (16 km) in length and 1 mile (1.6 km) in width at its widest. Lake Whatcom is located and managed within three political jurisdictions: the city of Bellingham, Whatcom County, and the Lake Whatcom Water and Sewer District. The lake is a popular area for motor boating, swimming, fishing, and other recreational activities.

The lake is divided into three basins. Basin 1, the Silver Beach Basin, is the furthest north, and has a maximum depth of 100 feet (30 m). Land use in Basin 1 is primarily residential development, with one large park and several small parks. Basin 2, the Geneva Basin, is the central basin where the drinking water for the city of Bellingham is withdrawn. This basin is the shallowest, with a maximum depth of just 40 to 60 feet (12 to 18 m). Land use is primarily residential, with a mix of lake protection program properties and some rural forestry. Basin 3 is the southernmost basin and is the most remote. At its greatest depth, Basin 3 is 328 feet (100 m) deep, and is estimated to contain 96% of the lake's total water volume. Land use in Basin 3 is composed of scattered residential development, mostly in the community of Sudden Valley, as well as rural and commercial forestry. The total area of the Lake Whatcom Watershed is 142 square kilometers (55 sq mi).

There are nine annual streams and approximately 25 additional small creeks and tributaries that flow into Lake Whatcom, accounting for 23 sub-watersheds in all. Lake Whatcom drains into Bellingham Bay by way of Whatcom Creek.

The lake has only one island, the 3-acre (12,000 m^{2}) Reveille Island, owned by Camp Firwood, which is believed to be the site of past ceremonies by Native Americans, due to the presence of pictographs and a zoomorphic stone bowl found on the island.

== Brief history ==
The earliest known settlement was a Northwest Coast Salish village at the south end of the lake, occupied by the Saquantch tribe. Around 1800 the Saquantch were pushed out by the Lummi tribe. In the 1850s came the first known settlement of Westerners on Lake Whatcom. The first claim of private land was reported for $8. Most of the area surrounding the lake was extensively logged by the end of the 19th century. Large coal mining operations also existed near the lake from the late 19th century through 1919, when the Whatcom Mining Company closed down. In 1946 J.H. Bloedel donated 12.5 acres to the city for what would eventually become Bloedel Donovan Park. In 1962 water was diverted from the Middle Fork of the Nooksack River, through a tunnel, to supply water to a then-new paper mill on the Bellingham waterfront.

== Reservoir ==
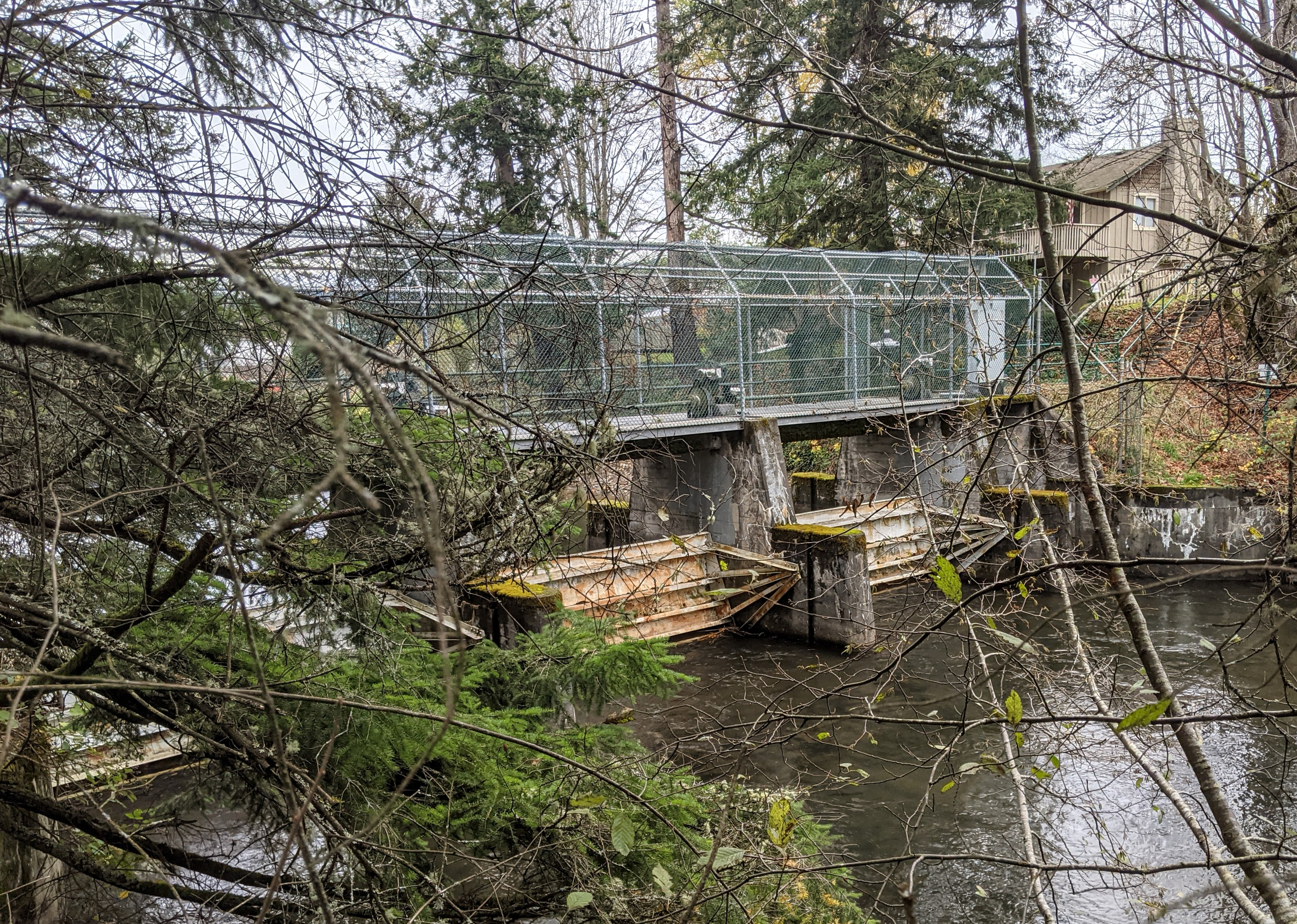
The control dam gates at the head of Whatcom Creek, within Whatcom Falls Park

Lake Whatcom is a reservoir of drinking water for the city of Bellingham, and its level is actively managed by control gates. The city manages the outflow to control the maximum level, to store the inflow, to provide for drinking water demand, and to keep the flow in the creek adequate for the threatened Chinook salmon.

As a drinking water source, Lake Whatcom Reservoir's quality is in compliance for all tested chemicals, bacteria and turbidity. Bellingham is a participant in the Partnership for Safe Water, and the City’s drinking water also meets the higher standards set by this group. For the past 10 years the City of Bellingham Public Works has received the Partnership for Safe Water’s Director Award for commitment to providing safe drinking water.

== Pollution ==
Lake Whatcom was placed on the Environmental Protection Agency's 303(d) list for impaired water bodies in 1998, due to low dissolved oxygen (DO) levels, which are directly related to the amount of phosphorus Lake Whatcom receives. Low DO levels do not directly affect drinking water quality. As required by the 303(d) listing, the Washington State Department of Ecology (DOE) created a computer model to find the Total Maximum Daily Load (TMDL) of phosphorus the lake can receive while maintaining adequate dissolved oxygen levels. In 2008 the DOE estimated that in order to achieve acceptable levels of DO, impervious/run off surfaces need to be returned to pre-1988 levels.

Most of the phosphorus enters the lake through non point sources, such as water runoff from storms in parks and lands surrounding the lake. A small portion is attributed to lawns, gardens, and streets containing some phosphorus. Aging septic systems serving development in the watershed possibly could leach phosphorus into the water body. In 2005 fertilizers containing phosphorus were banned to try to reduce the amount of phosphorus entering the lake. The city of Bellingham and Whatcom County have also restricted development activities such as land clearing, from October 1 through May 31 annually to prevent runoff from exposed soil during high precipitation months.

A 2010–2014 management program work plan for Lake Whatcom was approved by the councils of the City of Bellingham, Whatcom County, and Lake Whatcom Water & Sewer District (formerly Water District 10.) Annual analysis and progress reports are prepared to support of the five year management program.

View of Lake Whatcom from south end

== Hydrology ==
Lake Whatcom is a monomictic lake. The water body is stratified for part of the year (late spring through mid-fall) and mixed during the rest. This phenomenon is important to the hydrology of the lake. The top layer of water (epilimnion) is warmed by the sun and sits atop the metalimnion (also a thermocline). In this middle layer water temperatures take a pronounced decline and eventually a distinct third layer forms (hypolimnion), much colder and isolated from the rest of the water body. Minimal oxygen from the air diffuses down to the hypolimnion, causing very low dissolved oxygen (DO) levels. This combined with sediment oxidation, cause for near or complete anoxic conditions in the deeper levels of the lake. This stratification is more pronounced in Basin 3 where water is deepest. This layering of the lake, as well as the distinct physical barriers (sills) between basins cause for slow movement of water through the lake. (Ecology TMDL, 2008)

Another important hydrological phenomenon on Lake Whatcom is the occurrence of seiches. A seiche is the slow sloshing of water from one side of the lake to the other, due to winds in Lake Whatcom’s case. Winds will push water to one side of the lake, causing water levels to rise on one end and lower on the other. When the wind stops, the water rebounds back and forth until it is settled again. This up and down movement of the water causes the thermocline to rise and fall as well, which can result in the cold, anoxic water from Basin 3, to spill over the Strawberry Sill into Basin 2.

Major outputs of lake water are Whatcom Creek (77.5% of outflow), City of Bellingham intake (11.3%), evaporation (7.9%) and hatchery (2.5%). The estimated residence time of water entering the lake until it leaves is 7.4 years.

== Invasive species ==
Invasive species of particular threat to Lake Whatcom include zebra mussel, New Zealand mud snail, Asian carp, and viral hemorrhagic septicemia (VHS). Currently, none of the fifteen species identified by the state of Washington as "most unwanted" are found in the lake. Eurasian water milfoil is the only species on Washington's list of 50 unwanted species (13 of which are freshwater) that is known to exist in Lake Whatcom.

== Fish ==
Lake Whatcom is home to 13 species of fish. Among these are six native species: kokanee salmon (non-anadromous form of Sockeye), coastal cutthroat trout, longnose sucker, peamouth chub, sculpin and three-spined stickleback. Three species have been introduced to the lake by fisheries authorities: bluegill, rainbow trout, and smallmouth bass. Four species have been illegally introduced: brown bullhead, largemouth bass, pumpkinseed and yellow perch. The Department of Health has consumption advisories for smallmouth bass and yellow perch, which can be found at the DOH website

== Lake Whatcom watershed land use ==
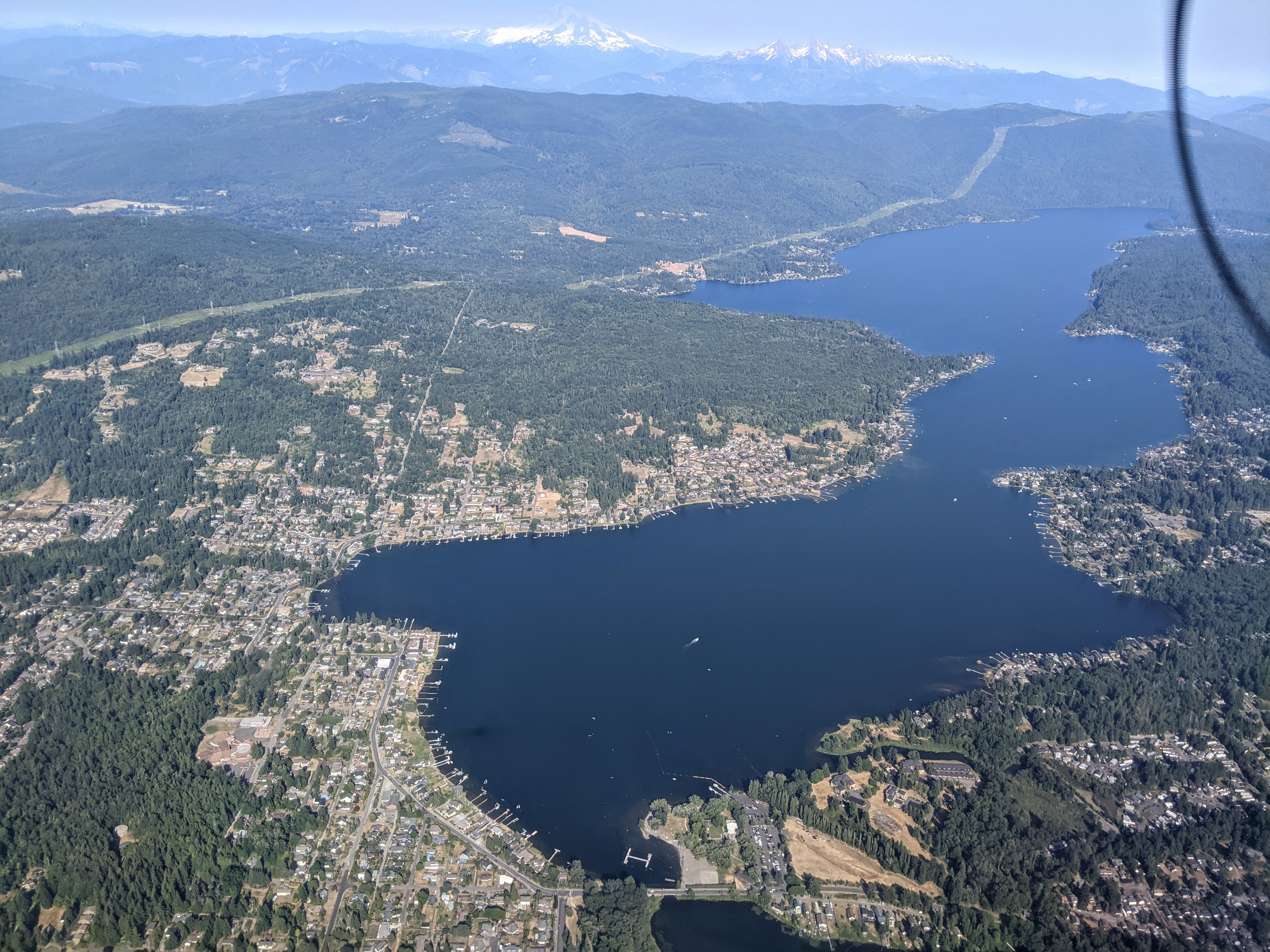
Aerial view of the lake, showing density of homes along the shore

Based on the 2014 Lake Whatcom Watershed Annual Build-Out Report there are currently 6,877 dwelling units in the Whatcom County watershed with appropriate assessor's residential land use codes, and improvement values of greater than 10,000 dollars. Of these units, 1,595 are zoned within the city of Bellingham, 1,551 are zoned within the urban growth boundary, 2,566 are zoned in the Sudden Valley neighborhood, and 1,165 are zoned as rural. There are 1,811 existing vacant lots with improvement values of greater than $10,000 and an estimated 8,688 total units with build-out potential.

Currently, based on the city of Bellingham’s 2007 guide to Lake Whatcom, the Lake Whatcom watershed is zoned for residential use, private commercial forest use, public land, urban growth area, and watershed protected properties, along with non-residential reconveyance areas. There are 31,127 total acres in the Lake Whatcom watershed. Of these, 4,007 are developed, 5,552 are zoned for development but are currently undeveloped, and 2,519 are protected under conservation easement, as a result of land use acquisition by the city of Bellingham and private individuals.
