= Whatcom Land Trust =

- Type: 501(c)(3)
- Tax ID no.: EIN 911246994
- Purpose: Land and habitat conservation
- Location: Bellingham, Washington
- Revenue: ▲$2.37 million (2024)
- Expenses: ▲$1.39 million (2024)
- Website: whatcomlandtrust.org

Whatcom Land Trust is a 501(c)(3) non-profit organization based in Bellingham, Washington that works to conserve and protect wildlife habitat, scenic, agricultural and open space lands in Whatcom County. The mission of Whatcom Land Trust is to preserve land for future generations and to promote land stewardship.

In 2024, the organization had $2.37 million in revenue, $1.39 million in expenses and $32.9 million in total assets.

Whatcom Land Trust conserves lands through conservation easements, fee ownership, and partnerships with individuals, corporations, government agencies, and non-governmental conservation organizations such as Nooksack Salmon Enhancement Association and The Nature Conservancy, among others.

Since 1984, Whatcom Land Trust has helped to conserve over 10,000 acres in Whatcom County.
