= Acme, Washington =

Census-designated place in Whatcom County, Washington, USA

- Census-designated place
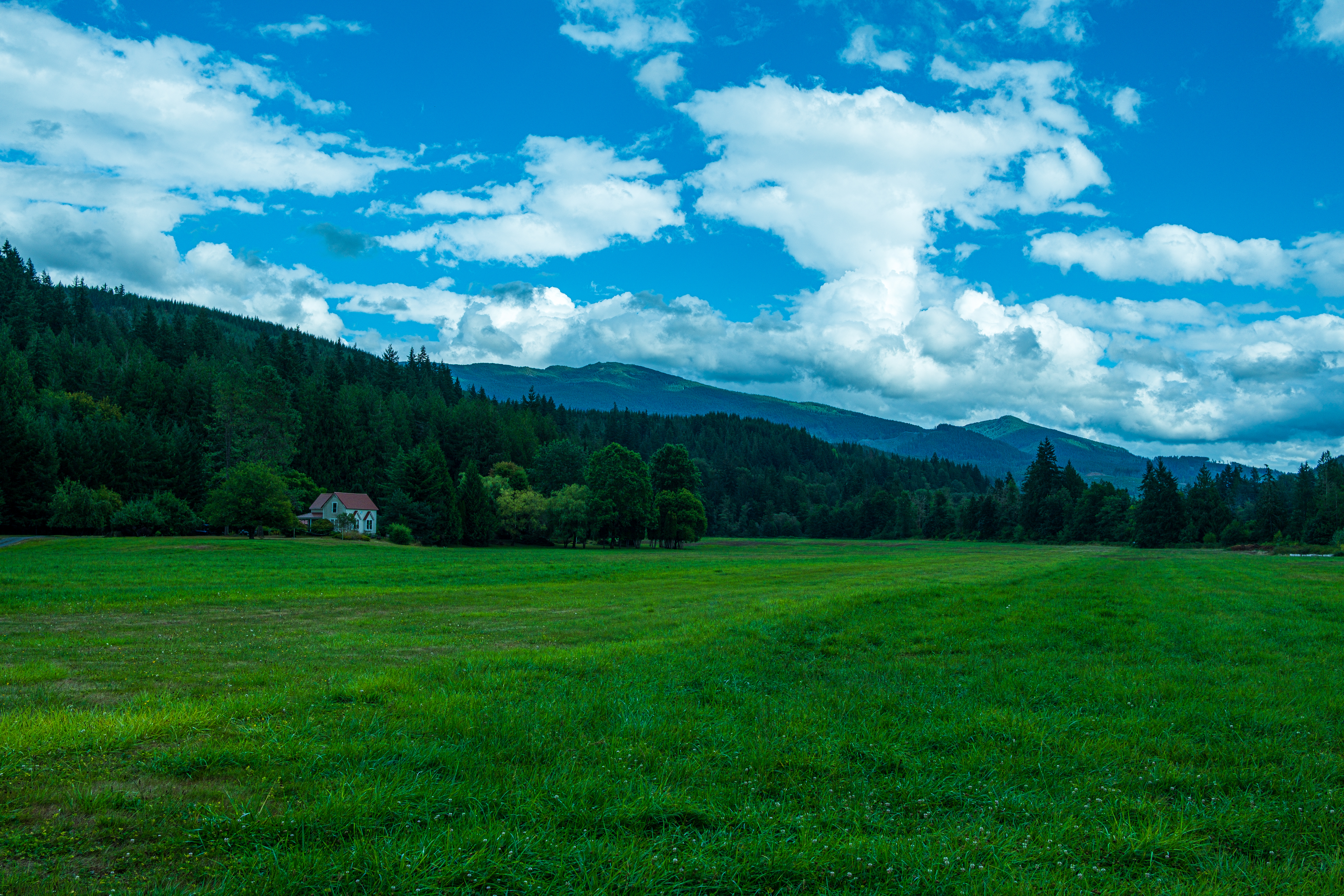
- Etymology: Greek word meaning "culmination" or "top or highest point"
- Location of Acme, Washington

- Location of Acme, Washington. Acme (Washington (state))
- Coordinates: 48°42′57″N 122°12′28″W
- Country: United States
- State: Washington
- County: Whatcom

Government
  - Type: unincorporated community
  - Body: Whatcom County

Area
  - Total: 9.8 sq mi (25.4 km^{2})
  - Land: 9.8 sq mi (25.4 km^{2})
  - Water: 0 sq mi (0.0 km^{2})
- Elevation: 325 ft (99 m)

Population (2020)
  - Total: 229
  - Density: 23.4/sq mi (9.02/km^{2})
- Time zone: UTC-8 (Pacific (PST))
  - Summer (DST): UTC-7 (PDT)
- ZIP Code: 98220
- Area code: 360, 564
- GNIS ID: 2407694
- FIPS code: 53-00275

Acme is an unincorporated community and a census-designated place in Whatcom County, Washington, United States. The population was 229 at the 2020 census, down from 246 at the 2010 census.

Acme is located in the South Fork Valley between the northern Cascade Mountains and Lake Whatcom.

== History ==
There are two accounts on how Acme was named.

The first states that Acme was named by Samuel Parks around 1887 after the name of a hymnal in his possession.

The second claims that in 1887, resident George Parls named the town after a local church's newly received Acme hymn book.

Either way, the English word acme is from a Greek word meaning culmination or top or highest point.

== Geography ==
At the 2020 United States census, the CDP had a total area of 9.8 square miles (25 km^{2}), all of it land.

== Demographics ==
Historical population
| Census | Pop. | Note | %± |
|---|---|---|---|
| 2000 | 263 | | — |
| 2010 | 246 | | −6.5% |
| 2020 | 229 | | −6.9% |
U.S. Decennial Census; 1970 1980 1990; 2000 2010

Acme first appeared as a census designated place in the 2000 U.S. census.

=== Racial and ethnic composition ===
Acme CDP, Washington – Racial and ethnic composition Note: the US Census treats Hispanic/Latino as an ethnic category. This table excludes Latinos from the racial categories and assigns them to a separate category. Hispanics/Latinos may be of any race.
| Race / Ethnicity (NH = Non-Hispanic) | Pop 2000 | Pop 2010 | Pop 2020 | % 2000 | % 2010 | % 2020 |
|---|---|---|---|---|---|---|
| White alone (NH) | 242 | 223 | 209 | 92.02% | 90.65% | 91.27% |
| Black or African American alone (NH) | 0 | 1 | 0 | 0.00% | 0.41% | 0.00% |
| Native American or Alaska Native alone (NH) | 0 | 3 | 0 | 0.00% | 1.22% | 0.00% |
| Asian alone (NH) | 0 | 0 | 1 | 0.00% | 0.00% | 0.44% |
| Native Hawaiian or Pacific Islander alone (NH) | 0 | 0 | 0 | 0.00% | 0.00% | 0.00% |
| Other race alone (NH) | 0 | 0 | 0 | 0.00% | 0.00% | 0.00% |
| Mixed race or Multiracial (NH) | 8 | 12 | 9 | 3.04% | 4.88% | 3.93% |
| Hispanic or Latino (any race) | 13 | 7 | 10 | 4.94% | 2.85% | 4.37% |
| Total | 263 | 246 | 229 | 100.00% | 100.00% | 100.00% |

=== 2000 census ===
As of the census of 2000, there were 263 people, 82 households, and 66 families residing in the CDP. The population density was 26.8 people per square mile (10.3 people/km^{2}). There were 88 housing units at an average density of 9.0 units per square mile (3.5 units/km^{2}). The racial makeup of the CDP was 93.16% White, 3.80% from other races, and 3.04% from two or more races. Hispanic or Latino of any race were 4.94% of the population.

There were 82 households, out of which 53.7% had children under the age of 18 living with them, 61.0% were married couples living together, 9.8% had a female householder with no husband present, and 19.5% were non-families. 13.4% of all households were made up of individuals, and 4.9% had someone living alone who was 65 years of age or older. The average household size was 3.20 and the average family size was 3.52.

In the CDP, the age distribution of the population shows 37.6% under the age of 18, 8.4% from 18 to 24, 28.5% from 25 to 44, 19.8% from 45 to 64, and 5.7% who were 65 years of age or older. The median age was 30 years. For every 100 females, there were 90.6 males. For every 100 females age 18 and over, there were 90.7 males.

The median income for a household in the CDP was $41,964, and the median income for a family was $48,854. Males had a median income of $52,708 versus $0 for females. The per capita income for the CDP was $17,147. None of the families and 13.2% of the population were living below the poverty line.

== Education ==
The community is served by the Mount Baker School District, with an elementary school located within the town. The nearest Junior and Senior High School is in Deming, Washington.

== Notable people ==
- Ann Anderson – former member of Washington State Senate
- Paul R. Brass – noted scholar of ethnic politics, political violence and Indian politics

== See also ==
- Index of Washington (state)-related articles
- List of census-designated places in Washington
