= National Register of Historic Places listings in Whatcom County, Washington =

Location of Whatcom County in Washington

This is a list of the National Register of Historic Places listings in Whatcom County, Washington.

This is intended to be a complete list of the properties and districts on the National Register of Historic Places in Whatcom County, Washington, United States. Latitude and longitude coordinates are provided for many National Register properties and districts; these locations may be seen together in a map.

There are 74 properties and districts listed on the National Register in the county. Another property was once listed but has been removed.

This National Park Service list is complete through NPS recent listings posted August 28, 2026.

== Current listings ==
	Name on the Register	Image	Date listed	Location	City or town	Description
1	Aftermath Clubhouse	Aftermath Clubhouse	December 14, 1978 (#78002785)	1300 Broadway; 48°45′28″N 122°29′24″W	Bellingham	Some guess Aftermath Clubhouse to be the first women's clubhouse built in Washington.
2	Austin Pass Warming Hut	Austin Pass Warming Hut	December 21, 1990 (#90001866)	Southeast of Bagley Lakes, Mt. Baker-Snoqualmie NF; 48°51′18″N 121°40′59″W	Glacier	
3	Dr. William H. and Frances C. Axtell House	Dr. William H. and Frances C. Axtell House	March 7, 2012 (#12000087)	413 E. Maple St. 48°44′44″N 122°28′41″W	Bellingham	
4	B. P. O. E. Building	B. P. O. E. Building	March 26, 1992 (#92000282)	1412-1414 Cornwall Ave. 48°45′05″N 122°28′31″W	Bellingham	Also known as the Elk's Club.
5	George H. Bacon House	George H. Bacon House	November 21, 1974 (#74001989)	2001 Eldridge Ave. 48°45′33″N 122°29′43″W	Bellingham	Built by Henry Bacon, first cousin of George.
6	Barlow Building	Barlow Building	December 15, 2004 (#04001371)	211 W. Holly St. 48°45′09″N 122°28′50″W	Bellingham	The Barlow Building currently houses a restaurant named Black Sheep.
7	Beaver Pass Shelter	Beaver Pass Shelter	February 10, 1989 (#88003448)	Beaver Pass, 14 mi (23 km). west of Ross Lake; 48°52′20″N 121°14′56″W	Diablo	
8	Bellingham City Hall	Bellingham City Hall	December 30, 2011 (#11000987)	210 Lottie St. 48°45′20″N 122°28′44″W	Bellingham	
9	Bellingham Herald Building	Bellingham Herald Building	December 31, 2013 (#13001032)	1155 N. State St. 48°44′51″N 122°28′45″W	Bellingham	
10	Bellingham National Bank Building	Bellingham National Bank Building	October 13, 1983 (#83004275)	101-111 E. Holly St. 48°45′00″N 122°28′38″W	Bellingham	
11	Berthusen Barn and Privy	Berthusen Barn and Privy	April 22, 2003 (#03000306)	8837 Bethusen Rd. 48°57′43″N 122°30′25″W	Lynden	
12	Alfred L. Black House	Alfred L. Black House	December 4, 1980 (#80004012)	158 S. Forest St. 48°44′07″N 122°29′38″W	Bellingham	Also known as Wahl House.
13	Boundary Marker No. 1	Boundary Marker No. 1	May 30, 1975 (#75001881)	Marine Dr. at U.S./Canada border 49°00′08″N 123°05′17″W	Point Roberts	
14	Broadway Park Historic District	Broadway Park Historic District	January 4, 2012 (#11001014)	Roughly bounded by Illinois, W. North, Summer & Ellis Sts. 48°45′55″N 122°28′37″W	Bellingham	
15	Cissna Cottages Historic District	Cissna Cottages Historic District	January 11, 2010 (#09001219)	Area roughly bounded by H., Halleck, G., and Girard Sts. 48°45′35″N 122°29′02″W	Bellingham	
16	Copper Mountain Fire Lookout	Copper Mountain Fire Lookout	February 10, 1989 (#88003446)	On Copper Mountain, 10 mi (16 km). east of Hannegan Campground; 48°54′33″N 121°27′41″W	Newhalem	
17	Daylight Building	Daylight Building	December 15, 2004 (#04001370)	1201-1213 N. State St. 48°44′59″N 122°28′43″W	Bellingham	
18	Deer Lick Cabin	Deer Lick Cabin	February 10, 1989 (#88003452)	East of Ross Lake on Lightning Creek Trail, south of Three Fools Trail; 48°54′00″N 120°58′46″W	Hozomeen	
19	Desolation Peak Lookout	Desolation Peak Lookout	February 10, 1989 (#88003451)	On Desolation Peak east of Ross Lake, 6 mi (9.7 km). south of Canada–US border 48°54′42″N 121°00′54″W	Hozomeen	
20	Devil's Corner Cliff Walk	Devil's Corner Cliff Walk	June 7, 1974 (#74000909)	North of Newhalem in Ross Lake National Recreation Area; 48°41′28″N 121°13′23″W	Newhalem	
21	Diablo Hydroelectric Power Plant	Diablo Hydroelectric Power Plant	June 30, 1989 (#89000498)	Off WA 20 at W end of Diablo Lake; 48°42′52″N 121°08′04″W	Diablo	Consists of 520 acres (2.1 km^{2}), 1 building, and 8 structures.
22	J. J. Donovan House	J. J. Donovan House	January 27, 1983 (#83003356)	1201 Garden St. 48°44′47″N 122°28′31″W	Bellingham	Was used as a women's dormitory by Western Washington University for roughly 25 years.
23	Downtown Bellingham Historic District		December 29, 2014 (#14001110)	Roughly bounded by E. Maple, N. Forest, York, Prospect, Bay & W. Chestnut Sts., Central & Cornwall Aves. 48°45′43″N 122°29′48″W	Bellingham	
24	Eldridge Avenue Historic District	Eldridge Avenue Historic District	July 27, 1979 (#79002566)	Eldridge Ave. and environs 48°45′43″N 122°29′48″W	Bellingham	Encompasses 1,500 acres (6.1 km^{2}), 683 buildings, and 1 structure.
25	Eldridge Homesite and Mansion	Eldridge Homesite and Mansion	January 27, 1983 (#83003357)	2915 Eldridge Ave. 48°45′46″N 122°30′29″W	Bellingham	The home currently occupying the site, is the fourth, being built after three others burned.
26	Fairhaven Historic District	Fairhaven Historic District	August 19, 1977 (#77001363)	Roughly bounded by 10th and 13th Sts., Columbia and Larrabee Aves. 48°43′13″N 122°30′07″W	Bellingham	Roughly bounded by 10th and 13th Sts., Columbia and Larrabee Aves., (85 acres, 16 buildings)
27	Fairhaven Library	Fairhaven Library	August 3, 1982 (#82004907)	1105 12th St. 48°43′17″N 122°30′05″W	Bellingham	Carnegie Libraries of Washington TR
28	Fish and Game-Hozomeen Cabin	Fish and Game-Hozomeen Cabin	February 10, 1989 (#88003454)	Hozomeen Lake-Lightning Creek trailhead on E side of Ross Lake; 48°59′08″N 121°04′07″W	Hozomeen	
29	Flatiron Building	Flatiron Building	January 27, 1983 (#83003358)	1311-1319 Bay St. 48°45′07″N 122°28′47″W	Bellingham	Bellingham's first "Skyscraper". It was originally built for the Bellingham Bay (B.B.) Furniture Co.
30	Gamwell House	Gamwell House	March 16, 1972 (#72001282)	1001 16th St. 48°43′26″N 122°29′44″W	Bellingham	
31	Glacier Ranger Station	Glacier Ranger Station	September 17, 1980 (#80004013)	Mount Baker Hwy. 48°53′16″N 121°56′07″W	Glacier	
32	Gorge Hydroelectric Power Plants	Gorge Hydroelectric Power Plants	June 30, 1989 (#89000499)	Off WA 20 at W end of Gorge Lake; 48°40′32″N 121°14′25″W	Newhalem	820 acres (3.3 km^{2}), 1 building, and 6 structures
33	Great Northern Passenger Station	Great Northern Passenger Station	May 30, 1975 (#75001879)	S end of D St. 48°45′14″N 122°29′07″W	Bellingham	Building is currently utilized by Burlington Northern-Santa Fe.
34	Hotel Laube	Hotel Laube	August 29, 2003 (#01000477)	1226 N. State St. 48°44′52″N 122°28′35″W	Bellingham	Currently being remodeled.
35	Hovander Homestead	Hovander Homestead	October 16, 1974 (#74001990)	5299 Neilson Rd. 48°49′46″N 122°35′24″W	Ferndale	
36	Immanuel School of Industries-Department of Public Welfare	Immanuel School of Industries-Department of Public Welfare	November 7, 2003 (#03001127)	1303 Astor St. 48°53′10″N 122°39′39″W	Bellingham	
37	International Boundary US-Canada		February 10, 1989 (#88003450)	Along US-Canada border between eastern boundary of Ross Lake NRA and western boundary of North Cascades National Park; 49°00′04″N 121°31′19″W	Hozomeen	
38	Koma Kulshan Ranger Station	Koma Kulshan Ranger Station	June 10, 1991 (#91000708)	Forest Rd. 11, west of Baker Lake, Mt. Baker National Forest; 48°39′42″N 121°42′49″W	Concrete	
39	Larrabee House	Larrabee House	May 30, 1975 (#75001880)	405 Fieldston Rd. 48°42′43″N 122°30′26″W	Bellingham	Commissioned by Charles Xavier Larrabee, he did not live to see it built. Also known as Lairmont Manor and Mt. St. Mary's Novitiate.
40	Leopold Hotel	Leopold Hotel	February 19, 1982 (#82004306)	1224 Cornwall Ave. 48°44′57″N 122°28′43″W	Bellingham	The Leopold Hotel currently houses a retirement home.
41	Lynden Department Store	Lynden Department Store	July 20, 2011 (#11000476)	444 Front St. 48°56′35″N 122°27′10″W	Lynden	Also known as the Waples Building / Delft Square. Heavily damaged by fire in 2008.
42	Middle Fork Nooksack River Bridge	Middle Fork Nooksack River Bridge	July 16, 1982 (#82004305)	Mosquito Lake Rd. 48°47′05″N 122°06′40″W	Acme	Historic Bridges and Tunnels in Washington TR
43	Montague and McHugh Building	Montague and McHugh Building	April 29, 1993 (#93000371)	114 W. Magnolia St. 48°45′05″N 122°28′41″W	Bellingham	Designed by John Graham Sr.
44	Morse Hardware Company Building	Morse Hardware Company Building	February 2, 2005 (#04001594)	1023-1025 N. State St. 48°44′52″N 122°28′52″W	Bellingham	
45	Robert I. Morse House	Robert I. Morse House	November 7, 1977 (#77001364)	1014 N. Garden St. 48°44′41″N 122°28′38″W	Bellingham	
46	Mount Baker Theatre	Mount Baker Theatre	December 14, 1978 (#78002786)	106 N. Commercial St. 48°45′08″N 122°28′36″W	Bellingham	Designed by Robert Reamer, designer of the Old Faithful Inn.
47	MV Plover	MV Plover	June 4, 1997 (#97000551)	245 Marine Dr.;Blaine Harbor Berth A-11; 48°59′37″N 122°45′31″W	Blaine	
48	Nooksack Falls Hydroelectric Power Plant	Nooksack Falls Hydroelectric Power Plant	December 15, 1988 (#88002735)	Rt. 542 on Nooksack River; 48°54′33″N 121°49′31″W	Glacier	
49	Oakland Block	Oakland Block	March 25, 1999 (#99000403)	310-318 W. Holly St. and 419 Champion St. 48°45′06″N 122°28′54″W	Bellingham	The Oakland Block was recently remodeled to provide low-income housing.
50	Old Main, Western Washington State College	Old Main, Western Washington State College	November 7, 1977 (#77001365)	516 High St. 48°44′17″N 122°28′58″W	Bellingham	
51	Orchard Terrace Apartments	Orchard Terrace Apartments	July 21, 2015 (#15000456)	901 N. Forest St. 48°44′37″N 122°28′56″W	Bellingham	
52	Park Butte Lookout	Park Butte Lookout	July 14, 1987 (#87001189)	Mt. Baker Ranger District, southwest of the Easton Glacier of Mt. Baker; 48°42′59″N 121°51′18″W	Sedro-Woolley vicinity	
53	Peace Arch	Peace Arch	December 13, 1996 (#96001493)	Peace Arch State Park, US 5 at the Canada–US border 48°59′59″N 122°45′10″W	Blaine	
54	Perry Creek Shelter	Perry Creek Shelter	February 10, 1989 (#88003447)	On Little Beaver Trail, 5 mi (8.0 km). west of Ross Lake; 48°55′16″N 121°09′21″W	Hozomeen	
55	Pickett House	Pickett House	December 13, 1971 (#71000881)	910 Bancroft St. 48°45′23″N 122°29′04″W	Bellingham	The former home of George Pickett is the oldest building in Bellingham.
56	T. G. Richards and Company Store	T. G. Richards and Company Store	August 28, 2003 (#03000861)	1308 E St. 48°45′17″N 122°29′10″W	Bellingham	Later became the Washington Territorial Courthouse. The oldest brick building in Washington.
57	Victor A. Roeder House	Victor A. Roeder House	November 7, 1977 (#77001366)	2600 Sunset Dr. 48°45′56″N 122°28′41″W	Bellingham	The home currently provides space for different educational activities.
58	Lottie Roth Block	Lottie Roth Block	December 12, 1978 (#78002787)	1106 W. Holly St. 48°45′22″N 122°29′14″W	Bellingham	
59	Sanitary Meat Market	Sanitary Meat Market	February 2, 2005 (#04001593)	1015-1019 N. State St. 48°44′52″N 122°28′53″W	Bellingham	The Sanitary Meat Market originally occupied 1015-1019 N. State St., now only 1017.
60	Sehome Hill Historic District	Sehome Hill Historic District	February 13, 2001 (#01000063)	Portions of Jersey, Key, Liberty, Mason, Newell, E. Myrtle, E. Laurel, and E. Maple Sts. 48°44′23″N 122°28′32″W	Bellingham	Includes portions of Jersey, Key, Liberty, Mason, Newell, E. Myrtle, E. Laurel, and E. Maple Streets, with 153 buildings.
61	Si'ke village with historic area called Tsi'lich	Si'ke village with historic area called Tsi'lich	June 30, 2000 (#00000697)	Address Restricted	Blaine	
62	Skagit River and Newhalem Creek Hydroelectric Projects	Skagit River and Newhalem Creek Hydroelectric Projects	April 26, 1996 (#96000416)	At Newhalem on the Skagit River and at Ross Dam; 48°41′50″N 121°11′14″W	Newhalem	420 acres (1.7 km^{2}), 21 buildings, 5 structures, and 1 object
63	Sourdough Mountain Lookout	Sourdough Mountain Lookout	February 10, 1989 (#88003449)	On Sourdough Mountain, 5 mi (8.0 km). northeast of Diablo; 48°44′34″N 121°06′29″W	Diablo	
64	South Hill Historic District	South Hill Historic District	February 24, 2010 (#09001296)	Bounded by Knox, 11th, State, Cedar, 17th, and Highland; 48°43′42″N 122°29′52″W	Bellingham	
65	U.S. Post Office and Courthouse	U.S. Post Office and Courthouse	April 30, 1979 (#79003157)	104 W. Magnolia St. 48°45′05″N 122°28′35″W	Bellingham	Formerly the Bellingham Federal Building, the building is now owned by the city.
66	US Post Office-Lynden Main	US Post Office-Lynden Main	August 7, 1991 (#91000648)	600 Front St. 48°56′34″N 122°27′13″W	Lynden	
67	James F. Wardner House	James F. Wardner House	December 1, 1988 (#88002744)	1103 15th St. 48°43′21″N 122°29′49″W	Bellingham	Also known as Wardner Castle, James Wardner only lived in the home for one year.
68	Washington Grocery Company Warehouse	Washington Grocery Company Warehouse	December 13, 1996 (#96001494)	1125 Railroad Ave. 48°44′53″N 122°28′49″W	Bellingham	
69	Whatcom Museum of History and Art	Whatcom Museum of History and Art	April 3, 1970 (#70000648)	121 Prospect St. 48°45′10″N 122°28′48″W	Bellingham	Formerly the Bellingham City Hall.
70	Wild Goose Pass Tree		June 7, 1991 (#91000706)	Address Restricted	Glacier	
71	Winchester Mountain Lookout	Winchester Mountain Lookout	July 14, 1987 (#87001188)	Mt. Baker Wilderness Area overlooking the N fork of Nooksack River and W fork of Silesia Creek; 48°57′25″N 121°38′31″W	Sedro-Woolley vicinity	
72	York Historic District	York Historic District	February 1, 2010 (#09001297)	Bounded roughly by Ellis St., Meador Ave., I-5, and Lakeway Dr. 48°44′57″N 122°28′05″W	Bellingham	
73	Woodstock Farm	Woodstock Farm	August 10, 2021 (#100006806)	1200 Chuckanut Dr. 48°41′52″N 122°29′45″W	Bellingham	
74	Young Women's Christian Association	Young Women's Christian Association	April 21, 1977 (#77001367)	1026 N. Forest St. 48°44′43″N 122°28′44″W	Bellingham	

== Former listings ==
	Name on the Register	Image	Date listed	Date removed	Location	City or town	Description
1	Citizen's Dock	Citizen's Dock	May 14, 1981 (#81000594)	November 22, 2000	1201 Roeder Ave.	Bellingham	Collapsed during a storm on January 12, 1987.
2	Old No. 6	Old No. 6	April 2, 1973 (#73002272)	January 30, 1974	SR 20; 48°40′25″N 121°14′48″W	Newhalem	Listed in 1973 without approval by the Washington State Review Board. They determined it was ineligible for listing, and requested removal. Now a contributing object of the Skagit River and Newhalen Creek Hydroelectric Projects historic district.

== See also ==
- List of National Historic Landmarks in Washington (state)
- National Register of Historic Places listings in Washington state
