= Barlow House =

Barlow House may refer to:

in the United States

(by state then town)

- Barlow Apartments, Little Rock, Arkansas, listed on the National Register of Historic Places (NRHP)
- Boce W. Barlow, Jr., House, Hartford, Connecticut, NRHP-listed in Hartford, Connecticut
- Aaron Barlow House, Redding Connecticut, NRHP-listed in Fairfield County
- Barlow House (Barlow, Kentucky), NRHP-listed in Kentucky
- Barlow House (Lancaster, Kentucky), NRHP-listed in Garrard County
- Gregory-Barlow Place, Mooresville, Kentucky, NRHP-listed in Washington County
- William V. N. Barlow House, Albion, New York, listed on the NRHP in Orleans County
- Smith H. Barlow House, Lacona, New York, listed on the NRHP
- William Barlow House, Canby, Oregon, listed on the NRHP
- William Barlow House, Barlow, Oregon, listed on the NRHP
- Barlow Building, Bellingham, Washington, NRHP-listed in Whatcom County
