= South Hill Historic District =

South Hill Historic District may refer to:

- South Hill Historic District (Lexington, Kentucky), listed on the National Register of Historic Places (NRHP) in Fayette County, Kentucky
- South Hill Historic District (Bellingham, Washington), listed on the NRHP in Whatcom County, Washington
