= Austin Pass Warming Hut =

- U.S. National Register of Historic Places
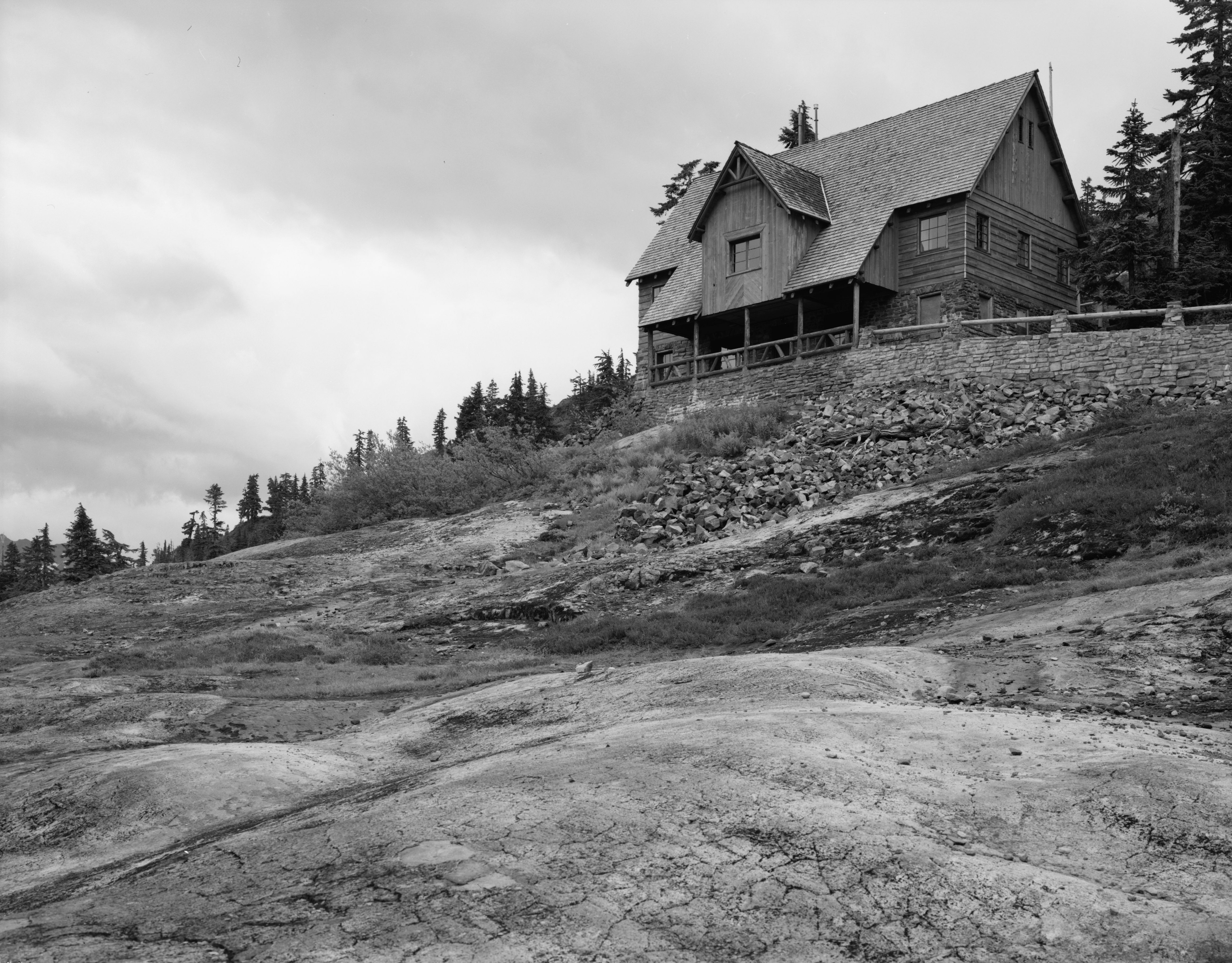
- The Austin Pass Warming Hut near Glacier, Washington.

- Location within Washington (state)
- Nearest city: Glacier, Washington
- Coordinates: 48°51′18″N 121°40′59″W
- Area: 0.8 acres (0.32 ha)
- Built: 1940
- Built by: Civilian Conservation Corps
- Architect: Civilian Conservation Corps
- Architectural style: Rustic
- NRHP reference No.: 90001866
- Added to NRHP: December 21, 1990

The Austin Pass Warming Hut was constructed in 1940 by the Civilian Conservation Corps (CCC). The Washington Junior Company 2915, was based at Camp F-12 near Glacier. Other contributions include 43 miles (69 km) of truck roads, the Glacier Ranger Station, four lookouts and 100 miles (160 km) of trail. The Austin Pass Warming Hut represents the Region 6 rustic style. The building is a fine example of CCC work. It's Region 6 rustic style includes: irregular plan, roof and porch projections, intersecting gables, dormers, multi-paned windows, and variations in exterior texture. The use of native wood and stone are a fine example. The columnar andesite veneer in the first floor walls is a figurative link to the rock on which it stands. The use of vertical siding moves the eye to the roof peak, linking the building to the surrounding peaks. Non-contributing structures include the radio mast, flagpole, propane tanks and septic tank.

== Appearance ==
The Warming Hut is a two and one-half story masonry and wood-frame building located in a subalpine habitat at 4,440 feet (1,350 m). The area is surrounded by scattered mountain hemlock and Pacific silver fir. The building is rest atop a knob of columnar andesite, with a sharp drop into the Bagley Lakes basins. A parking lot for about 16 cars is located just to the south. When originally constructed, the Warming Hut had a T plan, facing the northwest. The steeply pitched, cross-gabled roof is covered with cedar shakes. The roof and a gabled dormer extend beyond the front to create a wide porch. The porch has a flagstone floor with the main entrance in the center. The second entrance is on the southeast elevation. A third entrance, now the primary (2024) is located on the second-story porch in the south angle. Windows are surrounded by quarter-pole trim. The chimney is made of courses of columnar andesite. The first-floor walls are concrete with an exterior masonry veneer of coursed, rough-cut columnar andesite. The second floor and gables are covered with horizontal ten-inch clapboard siding. In the southeast gable and the northwest dormer the boards are placed vertically. A chevron pattern is used below the dormer windows.

The Warming Hut was constructed as a ski shelter, supporting the development by the Mt. Baker Development Company. The interior included a large warming room, waxing and drying room, and sleeping loft. It also contained either a lunch room or kitchen at different times. The warming room was finished with knotty pine paneling. The large massive fireplace is made from rough-cut columnar andesite.

The Warming Hut was not functional. Heavy snowfall made it difficult to maintain supplies, which had to be skied in. During the Second World War, the State highway department discontinued plowing of the road. After the war, difficulties delayed the return of a ski area until the late 1950s.

In 1972, the University of Washington used the Warming Hut as a field station. The first floor was modified with the removal of rest rooms partitions to accommodate electric generation equipment. The second floor saw the main room divided into four bedrooms, a toilet, and a living area. The food service area was remodeled by installing a drop ceiling, removal of the knotty pine paneling, replacing both the ceiling and walls with drywall. The original andesite fireplace located in the living area remained intact.

On the exterior, modifications were less extensive. A single-story room with a flat roof was added to house a 2000-gallon diesel storage tank. The walls are concrete with a coursed andesite veneer. Clapboard was used on the upper part of the walls. A pair of 1,200 US gallons (4,500 L) propane tanks are 50 feet (15 m) south of the Warming Hut, and a concrete septic tank, is located 50 feet (15 m) feet north. The Warming Hut was used as housing for Forest Service work crews. During the University of Washington or recent Forest Service occupation, a metal radio mast was added to the southeast elevation, and a flagpole placed in the south angle. In 2024, the building is the Heather Meadows Visitor Center.

== Bibliography ==
- Heller, Ramon, 1980 Mount Baker Ski Area: A Pictorial History. Mt. Baker Recreation Company, Bellingham.
- Schmierer, Alan C., 1983 Northing Up the Nooksack. Pacific Northwest National Parks and Forests Association, Seattle.
- Throop, E. Gail, 1983 A characteristic expression. Contract Abstracts 3(2): 123–129.
