= Edward Mylius =

Belgian-born journalist (1878–1947)

- Mylius in 1911
- Born: 4 July 1878; Ostend, Belgium
- Died: 24 January 1947 (aged 68); Brooklyn, New York, U.S.
- Other name: Edward J. Boskin
- Occupations: Clerk, journalist
- Known for: Libel conviction in England in 1911
- Spouse: Lena Boskin (m. 1944)

Edward Frederick Mylius (4 July 1878 – 24 January 1947) was a Belgian-born journalist jailed in England in 1911 for criminal libel after publishing a report that King George V of the United Kingdom was a bigamist.

== Early life ==
Mylius was born in Belgium in 1878. (Note: Some sources refer to Mylius as being French.) His father was born in England, his mother in Italy. By 1891, Mylius was living with a sister in Hammersmith, West London, at the home of an uncle. Between 1895 and 1901, he worked as a clerk. By 1909, he was known to police for attending anarchist and socialist meetings. That year, he visited France, where he met Edward Holton James, an American-born socialist living in Paris.

== Libel case ==
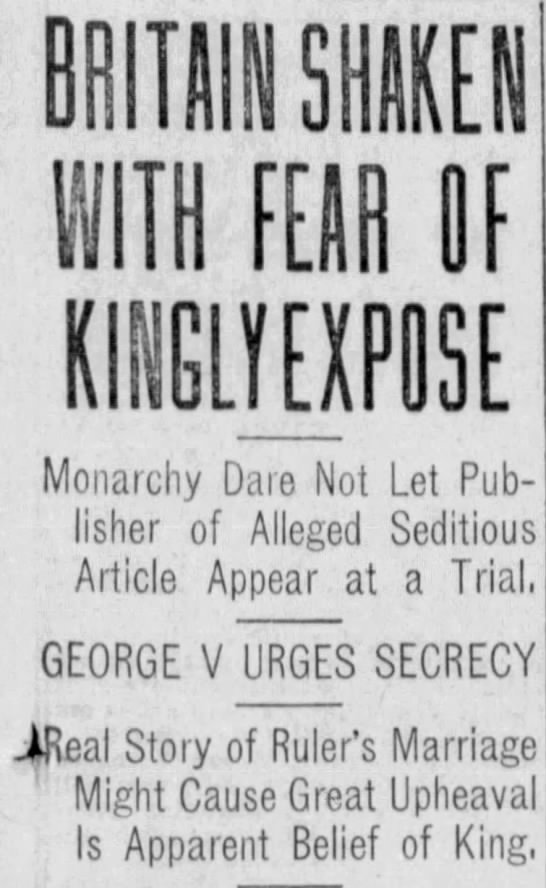
Front-page headline in the San Francisco Examiner of 31 December 1910 after the arrest of Mylius

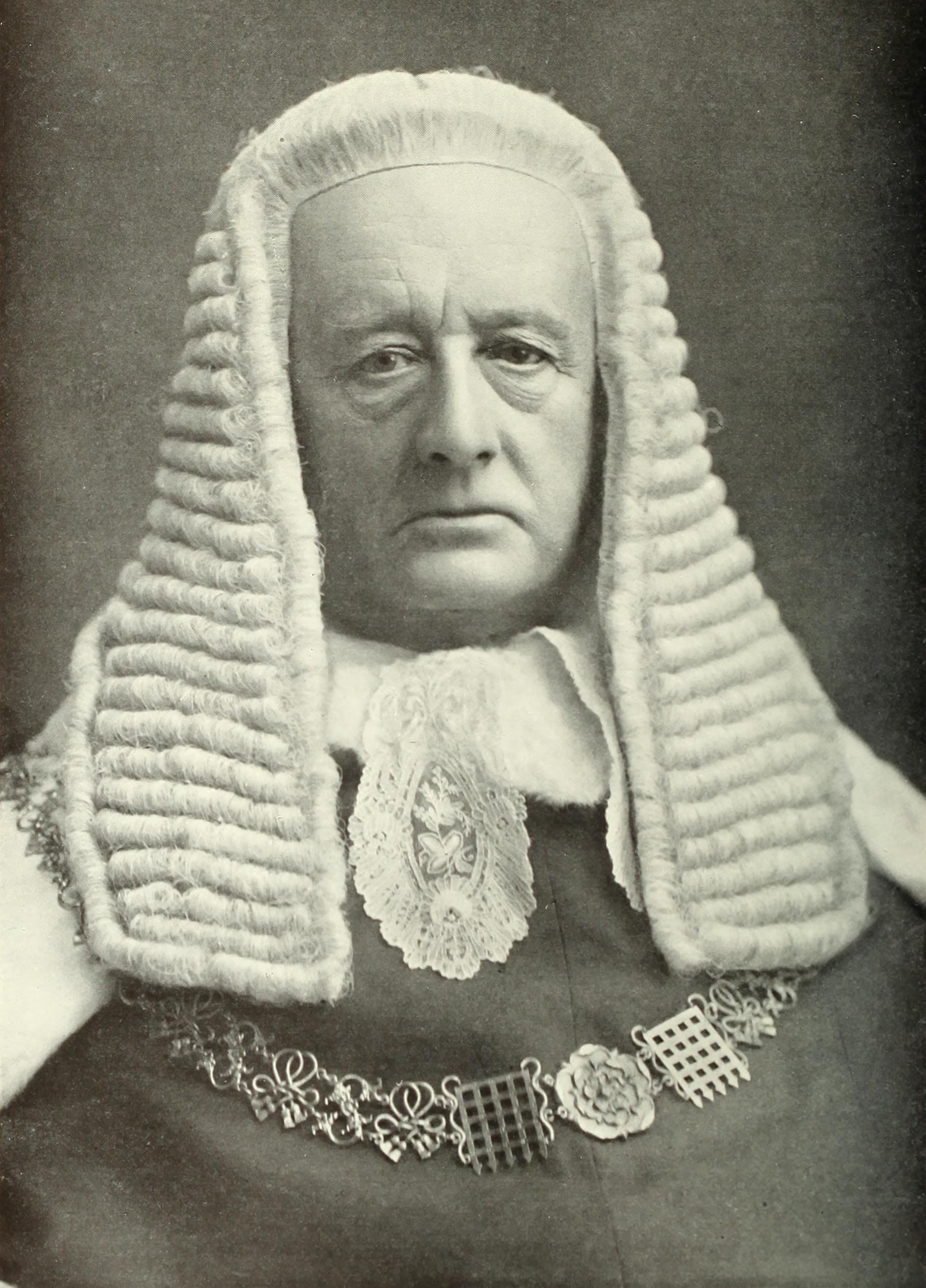
Lord Alverstone

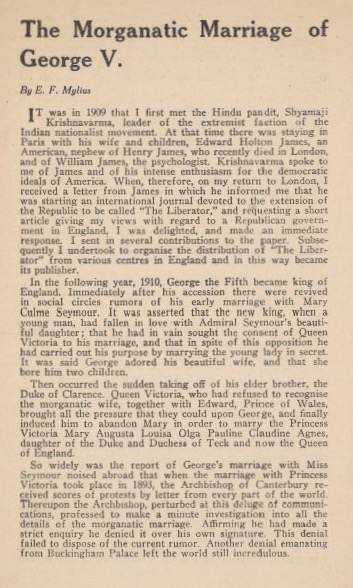
First page of Mylius' 1916 pamphlet

=== Background ===
George V became British sovereign on 6 May 1910, upon the death of his father, Edward VII. The king, while still a prince and heir to the throne, had married Mary of Teck in London on 6 July 1893.

In January 1910, Edward Holton James wrote to Mylius to suggest an article based on an existing rumour (Note: The rumour had first been published in the London newspaper The Star in 1893.) that George V had previously married and had children via that marriage. Shortly thereafter, James began publishing a journal called The Liberator. James told Mylius that they had "an opportunity to make a formidable attack on the Monarchy".

=== Libel publication ===
In the 19 November 1910 issue of The Liberator, Mylius alleged in an article entitled "Sanctified Bigamy" that in Malta in 1890, (Note: Circa 1890, George was not expected to become king, as he had an older brother, Prince Albert Victor. However, Albert Victor died of influenza in January 1892.) George V had married "the daughter" of Admiral Sir Michael Culme-Seymour, and the marriage had produced three children. That would have been not only scandalous but also illegal by contravening the Royal Marriages Act 1772. While The Liberator was published in Paris, police seized about 1,000 copies sent to England for distribution.

Normally, royalty avoid suing over lies told about them, but in a break with precedent, the King decided that in this case, he had no choice. The rumours accused him of the crime of bigamy and questioned the legal status of the queen consort and the legitimacy of their children. The King, with the advice of Home Secretary Winston Churchill, issued proceedings against Mylius for criminal libel and said he was prepared to go into the witness box to disprove the allegations. Attorney-General Sir Rufus Isaacs, advised the king that it would be unconstitutional for him to give evidence in his own court.

=== Arrest and trial ===
Mylius was arrested in London in late December 1910. Charged with criminal libel, not the more serious seditious libel, he was tried before the Lord Chief Justice of England, Lord Alverstone, and a jury. The prosecution, led by Attorney General Rufus Isaacs and assisted by Richard David Muir, asserted that the claims about the king were fiction:

- that the king had not been in Malta between 1888 and 1901;
- that the admiral, whose daughter the king had supposedly married, had two daughters, of whom:
  - one (Laura) had never met the king, (Note: Laura Culme-Seymour had died, unmarried, in 1895.) and;
  - the other (Mary) had not met the king between 1879, when she was eight, and 1898, when he was already married. (Note: Mary Culme-Seymour wed Trevylyan Napier in 1899.)

Mylius, representing himself, essentially did not mount a defence and asserted that he had been denied the right to face his accuser. He was convicted in a one-day trial on 1 February 1911 and sentenced to a year in prison.

George V recorded his feelings on the affair in his diary:

The whole story is a damnable lie and has been in existence now for over twenty years. I trust that this will settle it once and for all.

His mother, Queen Alexandra, wrote to him:

Thank God that vile trial is over and those infamous lies and foul accusations at an end for ever and cleared up before the whole world. To us it was a ridiculous story your having been married before ...! Too silly for words ... My poor Georgie - really it was too bad and must have worried you all the same.

Serving his sentence at Wormwood Scrubs Prison, Mylius was released after 10 months for good conduct.

=== Additional publication ===
After Mylius was released from prison, he went to live in the United States. There, beyond the reach of English libel law, he published another version of the claim, which appeared in a 1916 pamphlet, The Morganatic Marriage of George V, printed in Greenwich Village by Guido Bruno. The allegation was bolstered by finding a Hampshire Telegraph and Sussex Chronicle report of Mary Culme-Seymour dancing with the prince at a ball at Portsmouth Town Hall on 21 August 1891. (Note: This was on the occasion of a fleet review by Queen Victoria, of the French fleet visiting Portsmouth.) She had testified at the trial that she had not seen the prince between 1879 and 1898.

The king's biographer, Kenneth Rose, acknowledged in his 1983 book that Mary had had "a slip of memory" but judged it "utterly irrelevant to the accusation of bigamy". That inconsistency has been taken up by more recent writers investigating the allegations.

== Later years ==
Mylius's immigration to the United States was not without incident. Upon arrival in December 1912 at Ellis Island, he was interviewed and ordered deported, due to his libel conviction in England. His appeal with the US State Department was denied, but he was successful in federal court, a judge ruling in February 1913 that libel was not a crime of moral turpitude. The government appealed that ruling, which was affirmed in Mylius's favor in January 1914.

In New York City, Mylius associated with activists around Greenwich Village, including Max Eastman, Hippolyte Havel, and Margaret Sanger. On his draft registration card of 1918, Mylius listed Sanger as his nearest relative and gave his occupation as "manager and organiser" for The Liberator. At some point, Mylius was the lover of anarchist Christine Ell, whom Eugene O'Neill modeled the title character of Anna Christie on.

In December 1921, it came to light that Mylius had "borrowed" $4,000 from The Liberator (which he had left three months prior) and lost it on stock market speculation. Eastman, the editor of the publication, received partial repayment, but after being authorized to collect an additional $1,000 from one of Mylius's accounts, found that Mylius had already withdrawn those funds from the bank.

During the 1921 incident, Mylius was using the alias Edward J. Boskin and also used that name in the 1925 New York State Census. A secretary at a company Mylius worked for was named Lena Boskin.

At the time of his April 1942 draft registration, Mylius was unemployed and living in Brooklyn. Genealogical research by Anthony J. Camp finds that Mylius married Lena Boskin, 20 years his junior, in New York City on 3 July 1944. Mylius died in Kings County Hospital on 24 January 1947 of prostate cancer.

== See also ==
- Guy Aldred, an associate of Mylius found guilty of libel in 1909
- Ella Rhoads Higginson, an American author who mentioned the George V rumour in a 1910 book
