= Wild Goose Pass Tree =

- U.S. National Register of Historic Places
- Nearest city: Glacier, Washington
- Area: 1 acre (0.40 ha)
- NRHP reference No.: 91000706
- Added to NRHP: June 7, 1991

The Wild Goose Pass Tree is a historically significant tree which was originally located at Austin Pass near Glacier, Washington. The tree was marked by surveyor Banning Austin in 1893 during a road survey of the region; the mountain pass Austin surveyed, which was originally known as Wild Goose Pass, was renamed Austin Pass in his honor. The U.S. Forest Service later moved the tree to the Heather Meadows Visitor Center, which is located along the Mount Baker Highway in Mount Baker-Snoqualmie National Forest. The tree was added to the National Register of Historic Places on June 7, 1991.
