= Ella Rhoads Higginson =

American poet and author

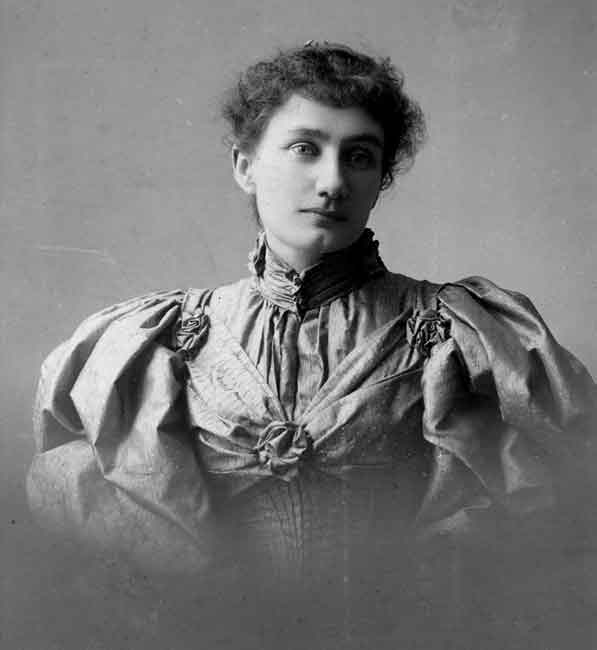
Ella Rhoads Higginson

Ella Rhoads Higginson (c. January 28, 1862 – December 27, 1940) was an American author of award-winning fiction, poetry, and essays characteristically set in the Pacific Northwest region of the United States. She was the author of 2 collections of short stories, 6 books of poetry, a novel, a travel book, well over 100 short stories, over 400 poems, and hundreds of newspaper essays. She was influential for the ways her writing drew international attention to the then little-known Pacific Northwest region of the United States. She served as an officer of the Pacific Coast Women's Press Association.

== Life ==
Ella Rhoads was born in Council Grove, Kansas, to Charles Reeve Rhoads and Mary A. Rhoads. She was the youngest of six children. In 1863, the family traveled by wagon train from Kansas to Oregon and first settled in Eastern Oregon's Grande Ronde Valley. They later moved to Portland, then to a farm near Milwaukie, then to Oregon City.

Ella was privately tutored and also attended public school. At age 23, she married Russell Carden Higginson, age 33, a druggist from the Northeastern United States. He was a distant cousin of New England writer and abolitionist Thomas Wentworth Higginson. In 1888, Ella and Russell Higginson moved to New Whatcom (later Bellingham), Washington where they would live out their lives. Higginson traveled to Alaska for four summers as part of the research for her travel book. In 1892, the Higginson house, known as Clover Hill, in Bellingham was built. On May 14, 1909, Russell Higginson, age 57, died after a short illness.

Higginson also helped establish the first public reading room and library in Bellingham, Washington, and for a long time was a board member there. During World War I, Ella Higginson ceased writing and volunteered full-time for the American Red Cross. She died on December 27, 1940, at age 78, having been ill most of the year. She left an estate of about $60,000. She is buried in Bayview Cemetery, Bellingham, Washington beneath a self-designed granite monument adorned with four-leaf clovers, a reference to her best-known poem (Koert, 1985: 7).

== Writing ==
Ella Rhoads began writing as a child. Her first published work was the poem, "Dreams of the Past," which appeared in The Oregon City newspaper in 1875 when she was age 14. At this time, she also began sending out her short fiction for publication, much of it anonymously or under various pseudonyms (such as "Ann Lester," "Ethelind Ray," and "Enid"). After her marriage, she began to publish under her own name (Koert, 1985: 22). On March 8, 1890, an article by Higginson appeared in Portland, Oregon's West Shore, a literary magazine. The article's controversial topic was divorce. In the article, Higginson argued that early marriage was more of a problem for women than divorce. Her recommendation that women would be wise to marry no earlier than age 30 garnered Higginson national notice (Koert, 1985: 52). That same year what would become her best-known poem, "Four-Leaf Clover," was published.

In 1893, Higginson's story "The Mother of ‘Pills’" won McClure’s magazine award for best story. The following year Higginson won McClure’s magazine short fiction contest, with a prize of $500, for "The Takin’ In of Ol’ Mis’ Lane." McClure’s printed 80,000 copies of the issue in anticipation of high demand. In 1897, the Macmillan company became Higginson's main publisher. They published most of her subsequent books and heavily promoted her writing. In 1902, when Higginson’s only novel, Mariella, of Out West, was published, reviewers compared it to novels by Jane Austen, Leo Tolstoy, and Émile Zola.

Alaska, the Great Country, an account of Higginson's travels in Alaska as well as a history of Alaska, was published in 1908 and subsequently went through several editions (Murray, 1990: 132). In 1914, Higginson’s story "The Message of Ann Laura Sweet" was named Collier’s magazine prize story and awarded a prize of $500 by a panel consisting of former US President Theodore Roosevelt and investigative journalists Mark Sullivan and Ida Tarbell. With these publications and awards, Higginson became known as the most popular writer of the Pacific Northwest (Baym, 2011: 55–56; Ward and Maveety, 1995: 57–59).

=== George V rumour ===
In 1911, Edward Mylius was jailed in England for libel after publishing a report that King George V was a bigamist.

Higginson had also written about the King's rumoured earlier marriage, in Alaska: The Great Country. She applied some poetic licence to the story of royal scandal, writing that when the young prince had to renounce that marriage, his beloved was given the royallest of exiles: near the City of Vancouver "in the western solitude, lived for several years -- the veriest remittance woman -- the girl who should now, by the right of love and honor, be the Princess of Wales, and whose infant daughter should have been the heir to the throne."

The International Socialist newspaper of Sydney, Australia, offered a new twist on this. Higginson's book in which this story of pathos appears had been acquired by the city's library in 1910. The newspaper mischievously opined that Lord Mayor Allen Taylor, as head of the City Council and thus responsible for its library, was as guilty as Mylius in publishing "the same statement with a cheerful disregard for the possibility of things", informing its readers that "the issuing of [a library book] constitutes publication under the law":

Mylius's libel wasn't any stronger, and this paper declares that what is sauce for the Mylius goose should also be sauce for the Lord Mayor gander, and it is hereby demanded that the Lord Mayor and the City Librarian and various other persons be prosecuted for 'libelling the king,' and that they each be given one year's hard labor, and taken to Goulburn Jail in leg-irons.

It is needless to say that 'Alaska' will be withdrawn from the Free Library immediately after this article appears; therefore, those who wish to get the book and verify the libel for themselves will have to call early to avoid the crush.

== Editorial work ==
Higginson started her lifelong editorial work at age 15 when she began work at the newspaper office of The Oregon City Enterprise, learning typesetting and editorial writing. In later years, she served as editor of the "Fact and Fancy for Women" department for Portland, Oregon's West Shore, a literary magazine; as associate editor of The Pacific magazine in Seattle; and as associate editor for the Seattle magazine, The Westerner (Koert, 1985: 89).

== Politics ==
In 1912, Higginson served as campaign manager for Washington State Republican candidate Frances C. Axtell, cousin of United States President Grover Cleveland. Axtell became the first female member of the Washington State Legislature (Koert, 1985: 118–119).

Although Higginson was not a political activist, she did voice support for women's rights and animal rights. Higginson wrote a screenplay in 1914 for a silent film entitled Just Like the Men, which follows two women running for office in Washington State facing opposition from male politicians, based upon her time managing Axtell's campaign. Higginson wanted Mary Pickford, one of the most famous American silent film actresses of the time, to star in the film, but Pickford declined. The screenplay was rediscovered in 2012 by Laura Laffrado, a literature professor at Western Washington University. The original draft of the screenplay is among the materials of the Ella Higginson Papers collection housed at the Center for Pacific Northwest Studies at Western Washington University. Talking to Crows, a women-led film production company based in the Pacific Northwest, adapted the screenplay into a film which was released for online-streaming in 2020.

== Honors ==
Higginson was the recipient of several national awards for her short fiction. In 1931, Higginson was named first Poet Laureate of Washington State (Bennett, 1998: 490; Blair, 1997: 34).

== List of books ==
This list is compiled from Blain, 1990: 520; and Koert, 1985: 150–151.

- A Bunch of Western Clover (Bellingham, Washington: Edson & Irish, 1894).
- The Flower That Grew in the Sand and Other Stories (Seattle: The Calvert Company, 1896); reprinted as From the Land of the Snow Pearls (NY: Macmillan, 1897).
- A Forest Orchid and Other Stories (NY: Macmillan, 1897).
- The Snow-Pearls (Seattle: Lowman and Hanford, 1897); reprinted Macmillan, 1902.
- When the Birds Go North Again (NY: Macmillan, 1898).
- Four-Leaf Clover: A Little Book of Verse (Bellingham, Washington: Edson & Irish, 1901).
- Mariella of Out-West (NY: Macmillan, 1902).
- The Voice of April-Land and Other Poems (NY: Macmillan, 1903).
- Alaska, the Great Country (NY: Macmillan 1908).
- The Vanishing Race (Bellingham, Washington: C.M. Sherman, 1911).

== Bibliographic references ==
Baym, Nina. Women Writers of the American West, 1833-1927. Urbana: University of Illinois Press, 2011. ISBN 9780252035975

Bennett, Paula Bernat, ed. Nineteenth-Century American Women Poets. New York: Wiley-Blackwell, 1998. ISBN 9780631203995

Blain, Virginia, Patricia Clements, and Isobel Grundy, eds. The Feminist Companion to Literature in English: Women Writers From the Middle Ages to the Present. New Haven: Yale University Press, 1990. ISBN 9780300048544

Blair, Karen J. Northwest Women: An Annotated Bibliography of Sources on the History of Oregon and Washington Women, 1787-1970. Pullman, Washington: Washington State University Press, 1997. ISBN 0874221455

Gray, Janet, ed. She Wields a Pen: American Women Poets of the Nineteenth Century. Iowa City: University of Iowa Press, 1997. ISBN 9780877455752

Koert, Dorothy. The Lyric Singer: A Biography of Ella Higginson. Bellingham, Washington: Center for Pacific Northwest Studies and Fourth Corner Registry. 1985. ISBN 9996605302

Laffrado, Laura. "The Pacific Northwest (Re)Writes New England: Civic Myth and Women’s Literary Regionalism in Ella Higginson’s Revision of The Scarlet Letter." Nathaniel Hawthorne Review 40, 1 (2014) 18–40. ISSN 0890-4197

Laffrado, Laura. "Ella Rhoads Higginson, Mary E. Wilkins Freeman, and Pacific Northwest Women's Literary Regionalism" Legacy: A Journal of American Women Writers 31, 2 (2014) 281–288. ISSN 0748-4321

Laffrado, Laura, ed. Selected Writings of Ella Higginson: Inventing Pacific Northwest Literature. Bellingham, Washington: Whatcom County Historical Society Press. 2015. ISBN 978-0-939576-27-2

Murray, John A., ed. A Republic of Rivers: Three Centuries of Nature Writing From Alaska and the Yukon. New York: Oxford, 1990. ISBN 9780195076059

Ward, Jean M. and Elaine A. Maveety, eds. Pacific Northwest Women, 1815-1925: Lives, Memories, and Writings. Corvallis: Oregon State University Press, 1995. ISBN 9780870713934
