= The Bellingham Herald =

Daily newspaper published in Bellingham, Washington

- Type: Daily newspaper
- Format: Broadsheet
- Owner: The McClatchy Company
- Editor: Scot Heisel
- Founded: 1890
- Language: English
- Headquarters: 2211 Rimland Drive, Suite 301; Bellingham, Washington
- Circulation: 10,957 Daily; 13,333 Sunday (as of 2020)
- ISSN: 2638-3160
- OCLC number: 14287261
- Website: bellinghamherald.com

The Bellingham Herald is a daily newspaper published in Bellingham, Washington, in the United States. It was founded on March 10, 1890, as The Fairhaven Herald and changed its name after Bellingham was incorporated as a city in 1903. The Bellingham Herald is the largest newspaper in Whatcom County, with a weekday circulation of over 10,957 as of 2020. It is owned by The McClatchy Company.

== History ==
The Fairhaven Herald published its first edition on March 10, 1890, and was originally based in Fairhaven. The tri-weekly newspaper was one of several established in the Bellingham area in the late 19th century. The first editor, William "Lightfoot" Visscher, worked for the paper for 18 months before falling out with Nelson Bennet, the landowner. Visscher was fired in April 1891 and returned to his previous occupation in Tacoma. In 1900 the newspaper purchased the first linotype on the West Coast.

In August 1903, Sidney Albert Perkins, owner of the Tacoma News and Tacoma Ledger, acquired the Fairhaven Herald. That December, the name was changed to The Bellingham Herald.The Herald fended off competition from the Puget Sound American, which had been established in 1904 by Seattle Times publisher Joseph Blethen. Two years later it merged with the Bellingham Reveille, but the combined paper was unable to overtake The Herald in circulation. In 1911, Blethen sold the American-Reveille to a group of local merchants and a month later Perkins acquired a 60% stake in the business.

The Herald moved its offices to the newly-constructed Herald Building in 1926. The Reveille was absorbed by The Herald in 1927. Perkins died in 1955. Federated Publications bought The Herald and The Olympian from the Perkins Press company in 1967, and merged with the Gannett Corporation in 1971. The Herald switched to morning delivery in May 1997 and launched its website on February 15, 2000. Knight-Ridder acquired The Herald in 2005. Knight-Ridder was acquired by McClatchy in 2006, putting The Herald under its ownership.

On February 13, 2020, The McClatchy Company and 54 affiliated companies filed for Chapter 11 bankruptcy protection in the United States District Court for the Southern District of New York. The company cited pension obligations and excessive debt as the primary reasons for the filing.

== Herald building ==
The Bellingham Herald Building is located in downtown Bellingham at the corner of State Street and Chestnut Street. It was built in 1926. The newspaper's main offices were located on the second floor, while tenant businesses occupied the remaining space, including a dentist, a restaurant, and the local chamber of commerce. Prior to the construction of the Bellingham Towers in 1930, the Herald Building was the tallest in the city. It is listed on the National Register of Historic Places, as well as the State Historic Register. The employee offices were relocated to the Barkley Village area in 2019 after the newsroom was downsized.

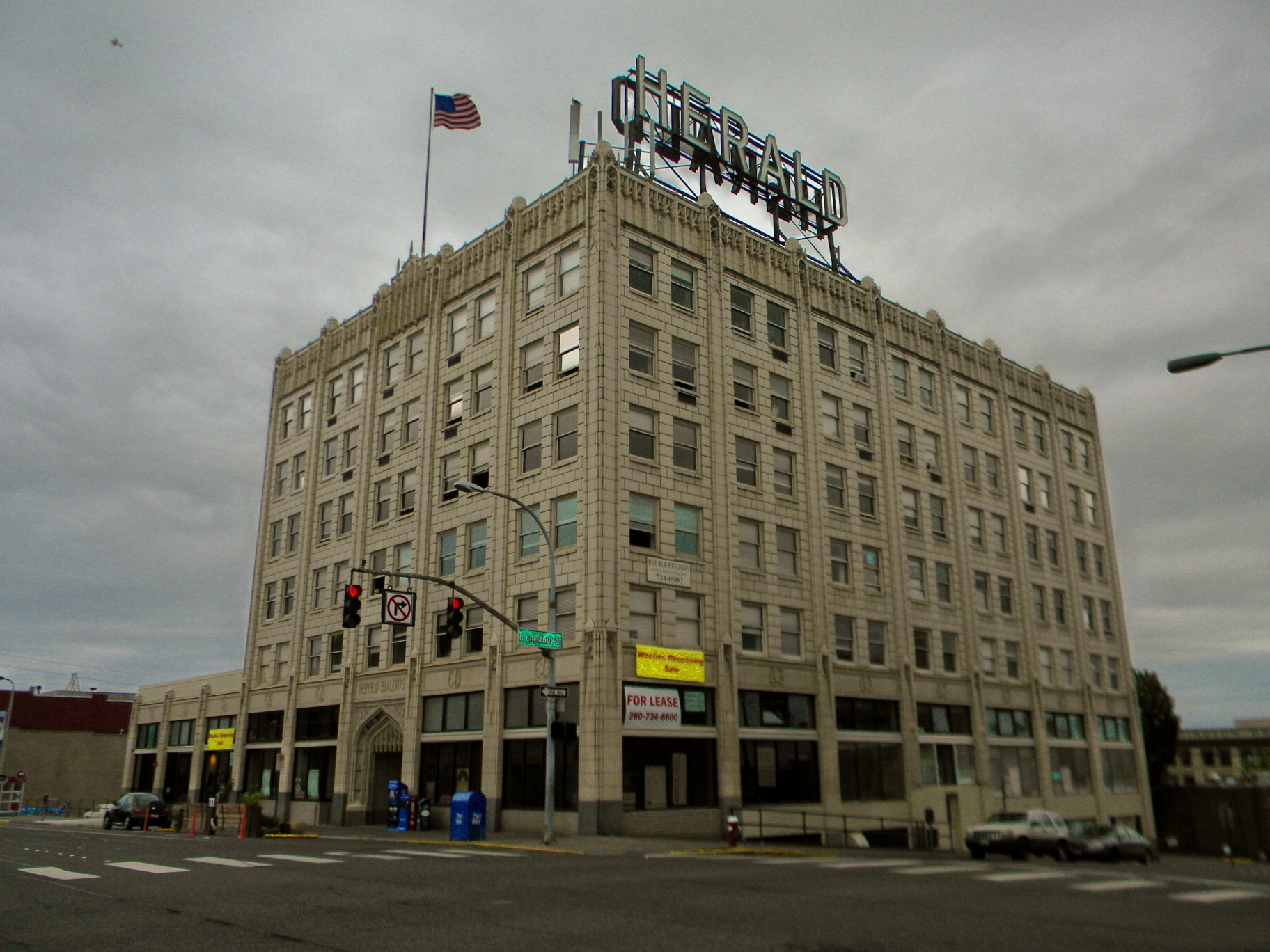
The Herald Building, constructed in true gothic revival style, stands six-stories tall in the heart of Bellingham.

=== Herald sign ===
The Herald rooftop sign, standing 40'x10', is managed by Daylight Properties. Morse Hardware had a similar sign for decades - and boaters would use the two illuminated signs at night for navigation. The original sign was lit by more than 300 incandescent bulbs before changing to neon four years later. In 2016, Daylight Properties installed modern aluminum lights, "creating a programmable LED lighting system that shows a variety of colors beyond the traditional neon red". The colors change to a bright red and green for the holiday season and can display multiple colors in accord with local festivals and holidays.

== Subscription ==
The Bellingham Herald produces newspaper articles in print and digital form. The newspaper is printed alongside the Skagit Valley Herald in Skagit County and distributed to businesses, homes, and newspaper boxes in Whatcom County, excluding Point Roberts. The newspaper ended its Saturday print edition in 2019.

On April 26, 2023, the newspaper announced its daily print edition will be delivered via the U.S. Mail instead of by a local carrier effective June 26. Beginning January 29, 2024, the paper will publish print editions only on Wednesdays and Saturdays, while an e-edition will continue to be published daily.
