= Aftermath Clubhouse =

Coordinates: 48.7577°N 122.4910°W

- U.S. National Register of Historic Places
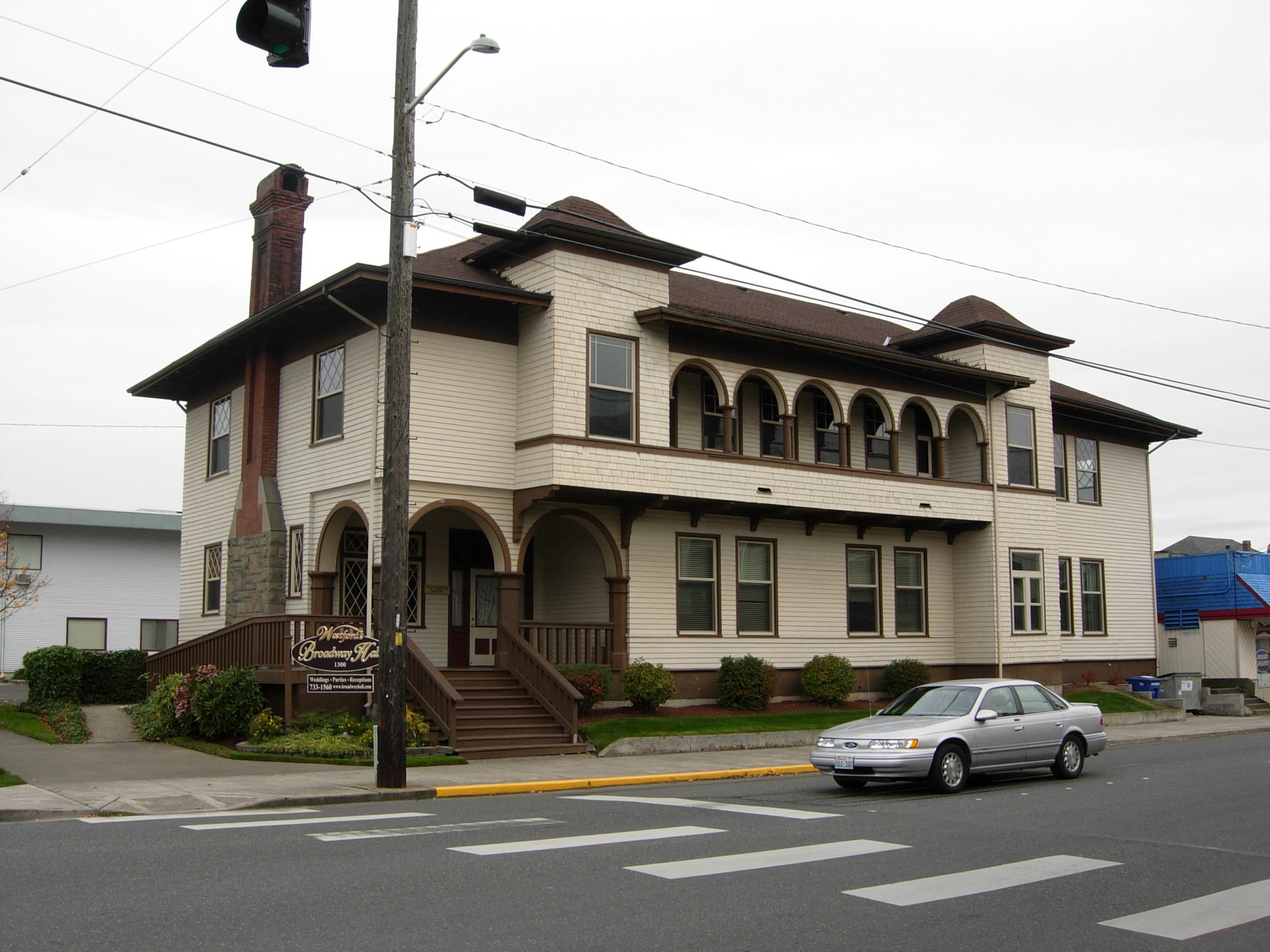
- Location: 1300 Broadway Bellingham, Washington
- Built: 1904-5
- Architect: Frank C. Burns
- NRHP reference No.: 78002785
- Added to NRHP: December 14, 1978

The Aftermath Clubhouse is a two-story, wood-frame Italian Villa building which was originally constructed in 1904. It is estimated to be the first women's clubhouse in the state of Washington.

== History ==
The Aftermath Reading Circle first formed in 1895, as a literary and social club for women of New Whatcom. The organization encouraged socialization, intellectual discussion and became a means for participating in community affairs. Once the informal reading Circle transformed into the formal Aftermath Club, the members took it upon themselves to raise funds to purchase property and build a permanent clubhouse. Designed by local architect Frank C. Burns, construction on the clubhouse began in October 1904 and it was officially dedicated on April 24, 1905 with a grand reception. For many years in Whatcom County it was the only clubhouse owned by its members. As a testament to their success, the Aftermath Club managed to pay off the debt of their clubhouse while continuing their charitable and philanthropic ventures.

== Today ==
The Clubhouse is still privately owned and is rented out for events. For years, the second floor was considered to be one of the best ballrooms in the area.

The Broadway Hall is owned and operated by Westford Funeral Home. The hall has been renovated and upgraded to reflect its original character, and is available for weddings, funerals, parties, dances and community events. It has over 5,000 square feet of space available for rent and is listed on the National and State Historic Registers

== See also ==
- YWCA Building (Bellingham, Washington)
- National Register of Historic Places listings in Whatcom County, Washington
