= Edward Holton James =

American socialist (1873–1954)

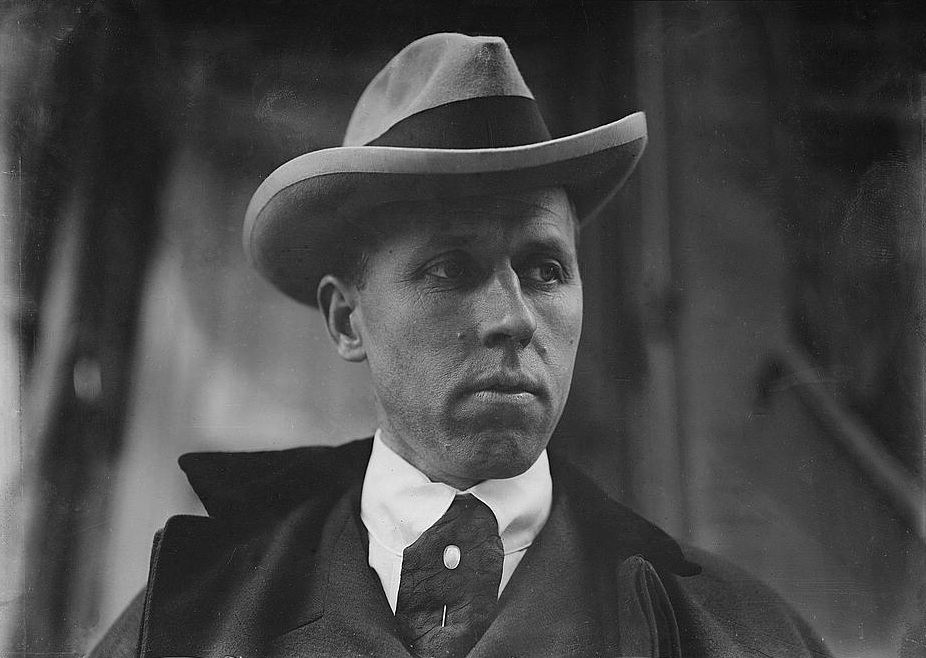
- James, circa 1913
- Born: November 18, 1873; Prairie du Chien, Wisconsin, U.S.
- Died: October 3, 1954 (aged 80); Rockport, Massachusetts, U.S.
- Resting place: Sleepy Hollow Cemetery, Concord, Massachusetts
- Education: Harvard
- Occupations: Lawyer, author
- Known for: Socialist views and activism
- Spouse: Mary Louisa Cushing
- Children: 3
- Relatives: William and Henry James (uncles); Alexander Calder (son in law)

Edward Holton James (November 18, 1873 – October 3, 1954) was an American socialist and, later, fascist. He was the nephew of philosopher William James and novelist Henry James.

== Biography ==
James was born in Prairie du Chien, Wisconsin, to Robertson James and Mary Lucinda Holton. He was the nephew of philosopher William James and novelist Henry James. He moved to Concord, Massachusetts, at a young age and lived there for much of his life.

James attended Harvard and graduated in 1896. On December 27, 1899, he married Mary Louisa Cushing, daughter of the Cushing family of Boston. They gave birth to three girls: Olivia, Mary, and Louisa (who later married sculptor Alexander Calder). From 1900 to 1906, James practiced law in Seattle, Washington. Soon after, he moved to France and was publisher of the Paris-based journal The Liberator, which in late 1910 printed an article about King George V that led to the 1911 criminal libel conviction of Edward Mylius.

In 1915, at the outbreak of World War I, James met with various socialists in Berlin. The German authorities took him to the border of Holland and instructed him not to return to Germany, punishable by imprisonment. But, according to his nephew George Vaux,

“By this time, he had developed another principle; namely that no one could tell him that he could not place his foot anywhere on the creator’s earth that he wished. Hence, early one morning before daylight, disguised as a day laborer and pushing a bicycle, but carrying still the two violins, he walked past a drunken sentry on the Belgium frontier and got back to Berlin. He was there for about two weeks before he was again discovered by the police, and rearrested.”

This time, he was not treated with the same restraint and was jailed as a political prisoner for the duration of the war.

In 1927, James took part in a Sacco and Vanzetti demonstration on Boston Common. As one reporter expressed,

"Before Governor Fuller granted a respite to Messrs. Sacco & Vanzetti the streets of Boston contained a number of persons who annoyed the police. Edward Holton James, the nephew of the late famed Philosopher William James and Novelist Henry James, attended a Sacco & Vanzetti mass meeting on the Boston Common. Smartly dressed, neatly barbered, looking more like a distinguished professor emeritus than a boisterous radical nephew, James shouted: 'Down with the police!,' assaulted a bluecoat, was promptly arrested."

In the early 1930s, James wrote two books on Mahatma Gandhi, and In March 1931, he traveled to India to confer with Gandhi and attend sessions of the All India National Congress.

In the 1940s, influenced by the ideas of American fascist writer Lawrence Dennis, James headed a nationalist group called the Yankee Freemen. In 1943, he wrote I Am a Yankee, a book published by the Yankee Freemen Movement. During the 1950s, he and the Duke of Bedford published The Word in Glasgow, edited by Guy A. Aldred.

The worldwide exploits of James are many, but one particular incident speaks to the nature of his character. He was a devoted violinist, often practicing for hours at a time, yet his style of playing was unique. As remembered by his nephew Vaux:

Having very short fingers, he decided that he would develop a whole new system of music for the violin, and therefore cut down the necks of all his instruments, thereby shortening them materially so his fingers could reach the strings more easily…The music which he then subsequently played consisted of very high squeaks and he would practice for hours in his room on these principles which he developed.

As his son-in-law Alexander Calder, too, recalled in his Autobiography with Pictures, “Mr. James used to the play violin atrociously but assiduously.”

James died in Massachusetts at the home of one of his daughters on October 3, 1954. He was interred at Sleepy Hollow Cemetery in Concord, Massachusetts.

The Edward Holton James Papers are located at Houghton Library in Cambridge, Massachusetts.

== Publications ==
- The Trial Before Pilate (1909)
- Crossroads in Europe: (a word for minorities) (1929)
- Gandhi the Internationalist (1930)
- Gandhi or Caesar? (1930)
- I Tell Everything: The Brown Man's Burden (A Book on India) (1931)
- Jesus for Jews: a History (1934)
- I Am a Yankee (1943)
