= Frances Cleveland Axtell =

American politician (1866–1953)

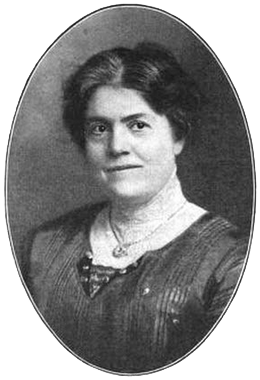
- Frances Axtell, from a 1917 publication
- Born: Frances Sevilla Cleveland; June 12, 1866; Sterling, Illinois, U.S.
- Died: May 27, 1953 (aged 86); Seattle, Washington, U.S.
- Occupations: Politician, state legislator, federal official

Frances Sevilla Cleveland Axtell (June 12, 1866 – May 27, 1953) was an American clubwoman, suffragist, politician, and federal official. She was one of the first female legislators in the United States of America, elected to the Washington House of Representatives in 1912. She was an appointed member of the Federal Employees' Compensation Commission during the Wilson administration.

== Early life and education ==
Cleveland was born in Sterling, Illinois, the daughter of William A. Cleveland and Mary Humaston Cleveland. Her father was a farmer and stock-raiser. Axtell earned a bachelor's degree (Ph.B.) in 1889 and a master's degree in 1892, both at DePauw University in Indiana, where she was a member of Kappa Alpha Theta.

== Career ==
Cleveland taught Latin and mathematics at Northwest Normal School as a young woman. She moved to Bellingham, Washington, then known as New Whatcom, with her husband and two young daughters in 1894. She was the first president of the New Whatcom Ladies Cooperative Society, and a founding member of the city's Aftermath Club. She unsuccessfully ran for school district district in Bellingham in 1897, and worked for women's suffrage in Washington State.

Running on the Republican ticket, with poet Ella Rhoads Higginson as her campaign manager, Axtell was elected to the 54th District of the Washington House of Representatives representing Bellingham in 1912. Axtell was an advocate for a minimum wage, the banning of child labor, workers' compensation, and pensions for the elderly, disabled, and widows. She also helped change aspects of criminal law, especially violent assault.

Axtell nearly became a U.S. senator in 1916, losing by about three thousand votes. Her relationship with her brother Frederick, who worked in the administration of President William Howard Taft, coupled with the publicity surrounding her 1916 attempt as a senator, brought her to the attention of President Woodrow Wilson. On January 5, 1917, President Wilson appointed her to the Federal Employees' Compensation Commission. She was one of the highest ranked women in the Wilson administration. She served as chair of the Commission in 1918 to 1921. In 1917, she spoke at the national meeting of the National American Woman Suffrage Association (NAWSA).

After her term of office in Washington, D.C., ended, Axtell returned to Washington State, and ran for another Senate seat in 1922, again without success. From about 1930 to 1936, she was Supervisor of Mothers' Pensions and a probation officer in Bellingham. She moved to Seattle in 1944, where she continued active in clubs and churchwork.

== Personal life and legacy ==
Cleveland married physician William Henry Axtell in 1891. The couple had two daughters, Ruth Axtell (née Burnett), born 1892, and Helen "Grace" Frances Axtell, born 1901. She died on May 27, 1953, in Seattle. Her house in Bellingham, known as the Axtell House, was divided into apartments in her later years, and is considered a historic site in the city.
