= Berthusen Barn and Privy =

- U.S. National Register of Historic Places
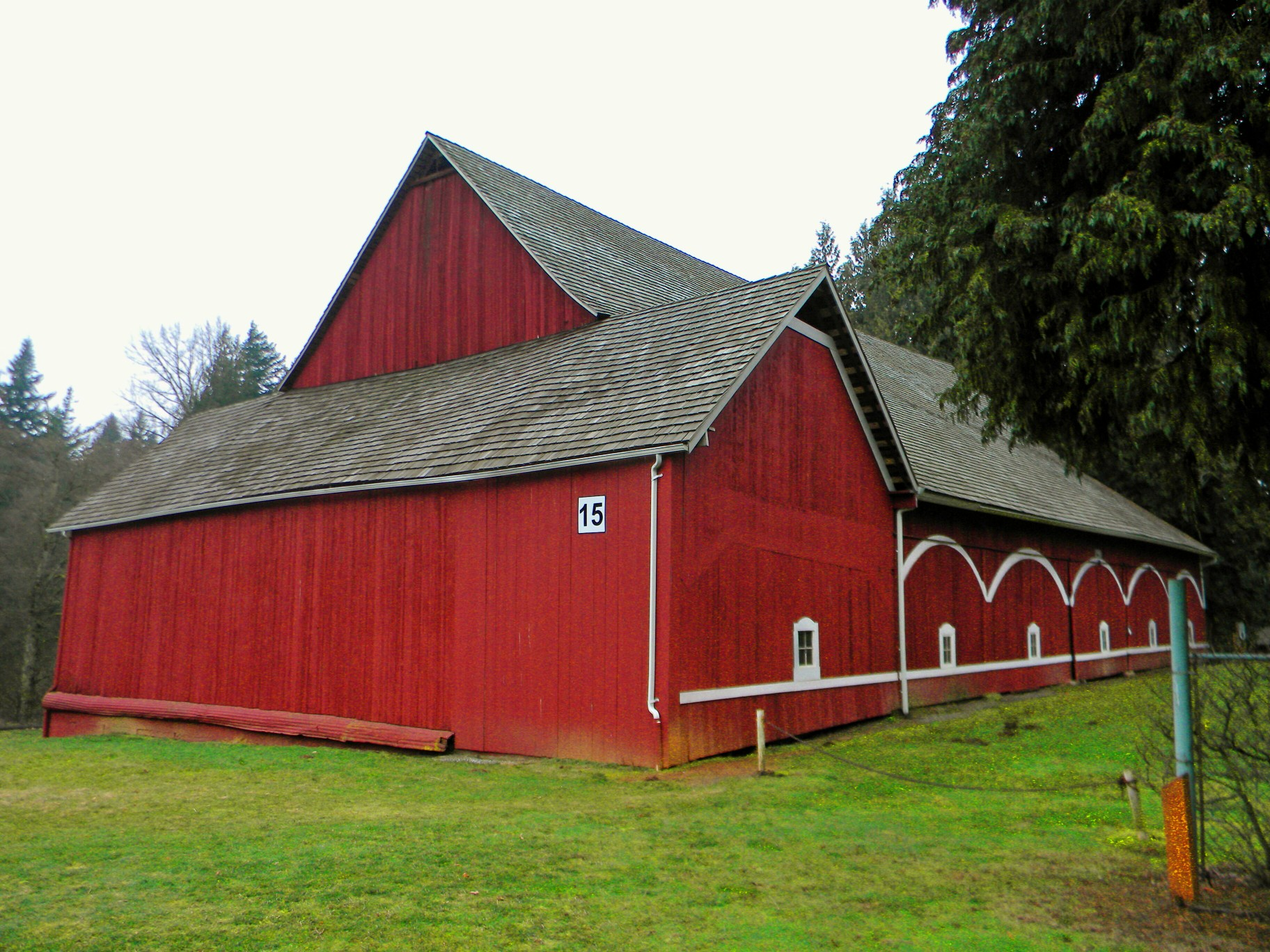
- Berthusen Barn

- Location within Washington (state)
- Location: 8837 Bethusen Rd. Lynden, Washington
- Coordinates: 48°57′43″N 122°30′25″W
- Built: 1901
- Built by: Hans C. Berthusen and Jack Jensen
- NRHP reference No.: 03000306
- Added to NRHP: April 22, 2003

Berthusen Barn and Privy, also called simply Berthusen Barn, is a historical structure located at the 236 acre Berthusen Park in Lynden, Washington. It was built using wood from the area by Hans Christian Berthusen, who was a pioneer resident of Whatcom County, and Jack Jensen. It was completed in 1901.

== Background ==
Hans C. Berthusen was born on January 20, 1860. When he was 4, his family moved from Norway to the United States during the American Civil War and settled in Iowa. Hans moved to Seattle in 1883 before setting off to Whatcom County with a friend named Mark W. Stone. Berthusen and Stone built adjoining homesteads. In 1889, Hans married Lida Hawley, who was born on September 30, 1864. Hawley's family had come to the area in 1872 from Iowa. They adopted a son, Peter Olia Berthusen, who was raised on the homestead.

== History ==
The barn was completed in 1901, and was one of the largest in the area.

In 1944, the barn and the land it sat on were donated to the city of Lynden by the Berthusens under the agreement that the park would be free to the public.

By 2002, the barn had fallen into disrepair and become structurally unsound. To secure funding for repairs, Lynden's parks and recreation coordinator at the time, Nancy Norris, led a push to have it added to the National Register of Historic Places. This was done on April 22, 2003.

As of September 2024, the barn and associated park remain free to the public. The barn contains several pieces of antique farm equipment donated by the Puget Sound Tractor and Machinery Association.
