= Bellingham Herald Building =

- U.S. National Register of Historic Places
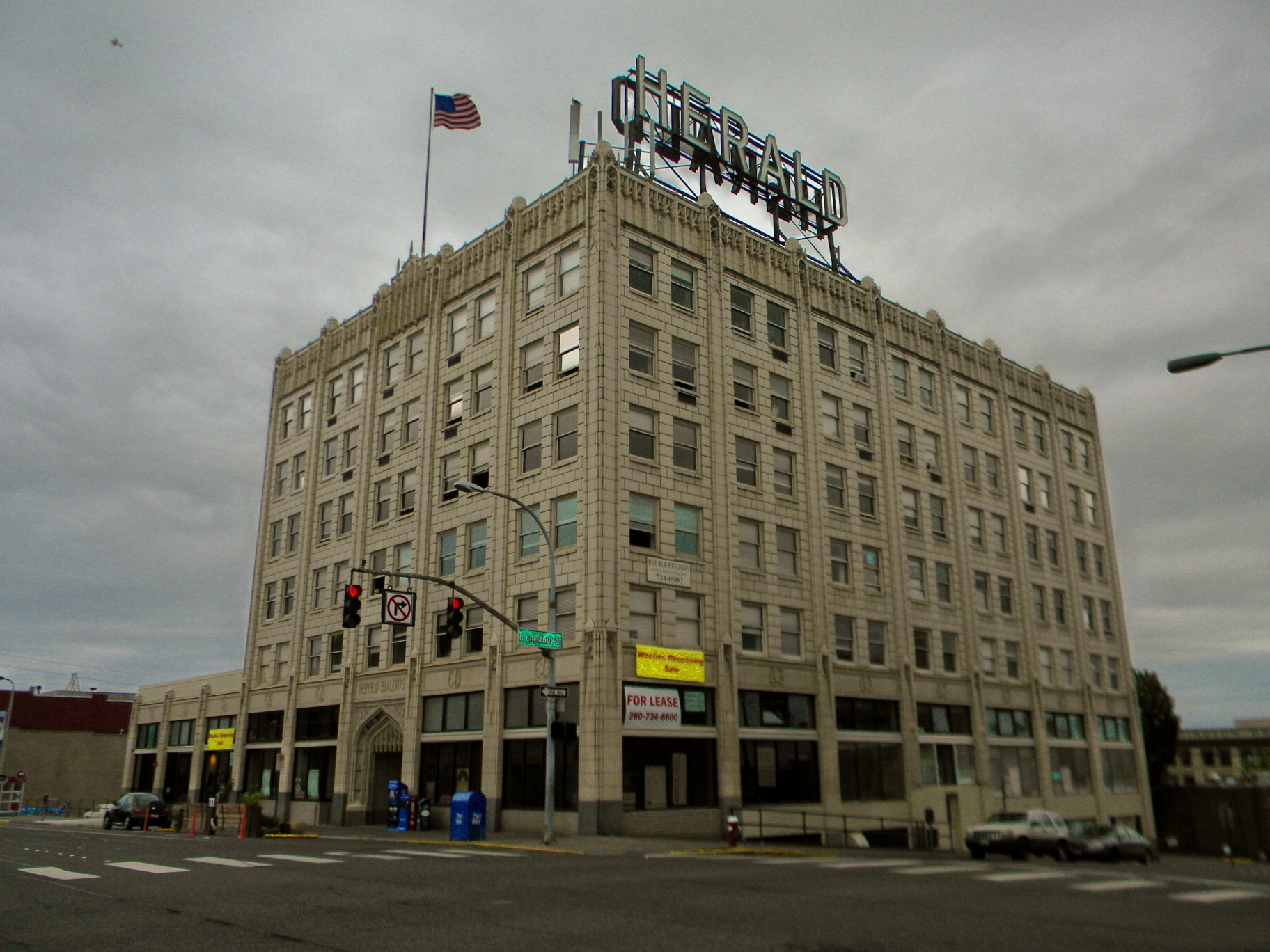
- Bellingham Herald Building

- Location within Washington (state)
- Location: 1155 N. State Street Bellingham, Washington
- Coordinates: 48°44′51″N 122°28′45″W
- Built: 1926
- Architect: Frederick Stanley Piper & Morrison & Stimson
- Architectural style: Gothic Revival
- NRHP reference No.: 13001032
- Added to NRHP: December 31, 2013

The Bellingham Herald Building is a historical building located at 1155 N. State Street in downtown Bellingham, Washington. It was designed by Frederick Stanley Piper of Bellingham and Morrison & Stimsons of Seattle. It served as the headquarters of the Bellingham Herald newspaper since its completion in 1926 to 2019.

== Background ==
Before the Herald building was built, the newspaper had published from four previous locations. While still operating under the name The Fairhaven Herald, the newspaper established its first publishing office in a two-story building 1890. It again moved in 1902 to a basement of a building in the Fairhaven neighborhood. It moved again to a bigger space in 1905. The last move occurred when the Herald merged with The Reveille and American newspaper and moved into their headquarters. Plans to build a more permanent space to house the Herald was announced on February 2, 1925, by then owner Sidney Albert Perkins.

== History ==
The Herald building officially opened on June 26, 1926. About 6,000 people attended an open house of the building on opening day. The total cost to complete the building was $325,000.

Upon completion, it had room for 140 offices, with the Herald occupying the first floor and the basement. It was the tallest building in Bellingham until the Bellingham Towers complex was built in 1930. Numerous steps were taken to make the building fireproof, with it being one of the first buildings in the western United States to use gypsum as a fire deterrent.

The Herald building functioned as a medical and social center for Bellingham in its early years. On the first floor there was an assembly room that could hold public meetings. Several of the first tenants in the building were multiple doctors, a pharmacy, law offices, both the Democratic and Republicans headquarters, and the Christian Science church.

By 1948, 45 doctors, dentists, and other medical professionals practiced at the building. One of the longest standing tenants was The Bellingham Clinic, opening the same year of the building in 1926. Two of the clinicians there, Dr. E. M. Rideout and Dr. Eric Johnson practiced at the Herald building for over 40 years. The Herald building remained center for medical practices from the 1920s to the 1930s. However, after World War Two, many professionals had moved out of the building and to a new dedicated medical center elsewhere in the city.

On April 6, 1959, two workers painting trim fell after the scaffolding they were using failed. The two men fell from about the fifth floor. One of the men, Ray Pauley of Bellingham, later died of the injuries he sustained in the fall. One witness to the accident stated that Pauley landed on his head. His coworker, James Wilson, survived with multiple broken bones and fractures.

In 1963, a renovation project of the buildings main entry, drop ceiling, and lighting was undertaken In 1980, the building was renovated by architects Stradling & Stewart. Both interior and exterior improvements were made. On July 5, 1983, the Herald building sustained slight damage after a fire broke out at a nearby restaurant. The total amount of equipment damaged at newspaper was about $15,000 to $20,000.

In June 2009, the Herald Building was bought by Bob Hall and David Johnston of Daylight Properties from the McClatchy company for $2.35 million.

The building was added to the National Register of Historic Places listings on December 31, 2013. In 2019, employees of the Herald were moved to the Barkley neighborhood of Bellingham as the newspaper downsized.

== Herald Sign ==
The Herald sign was first lit on March 7, 1926. It originally consisted of 370 incandescent bulbs. Upon completion it was the largest sign in Northwest Washington area.

By 1930, the Herald sign had been changed to neon bulbs. On July 20, 1934, stunt performers Betty and Benny Ross performed stunts atop a platform above the Herald sign for 30 hours.

In 2016, the sign was changed to LED bulbs.
