= Hotel Laube =

- U.S. National Register of Historic Places
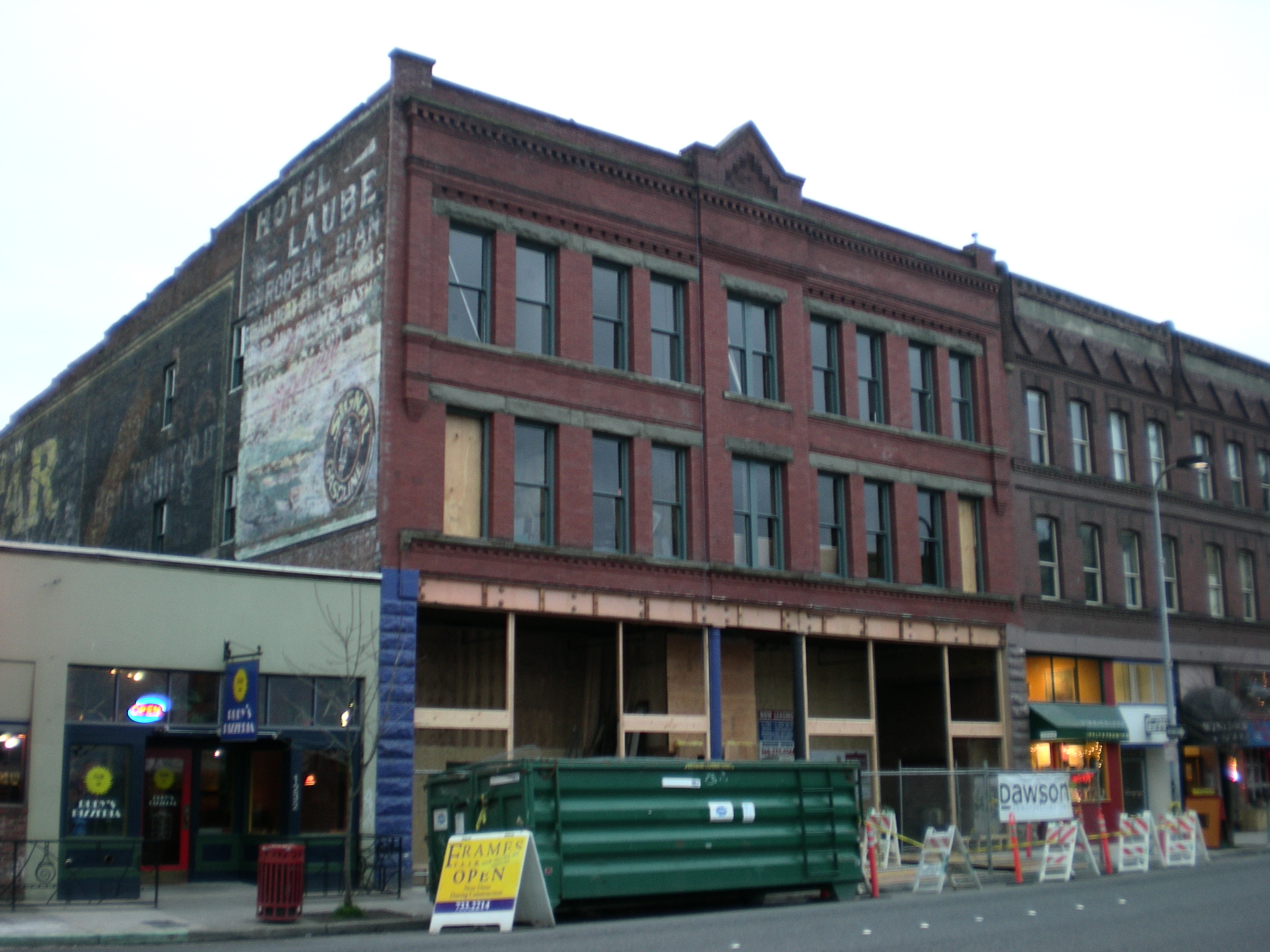
- Hotel Laube

- Location within Washington (state)
- Location: 1226 N. State St. Bellingham, Washington
- Coordinates: 48°44′52″N 122°28′35″W
- Built: 1903
- Architectural style: Revivalism
- NRHP reference No.: 01000477
- Added to NRHP: August 29, 2003

The Hotel Laube, also known as the Laube Hotel, is a historical hotel turned apartments located at 1226 N. State St. in downtown Bellingham, Washington. The building was completed in 1903 on behest of Charles Laube (1846–1928) and Margaret Laube (1851–1928). The building consists of brick and sandstone.

When the hotel initially opened on February 3, 1903, the top two floors contained 50 rooms for guests. After Charles Laube's death in 1928, ownership of the hotel passed to his sons, Charles F. Laube and Herbert D. Laube. The hotel closed in late 1983.

During the late 1970s, a bar and music venue opened on the main floor. The business ran under several names, such as Bucks, Pete's, and finally Bellingham Bay Brewing Company (later shortened to 3B). Several live music acts such as Death Cab for Cutie and Idiot Pilot performed at the venue. 3B closed its doors on December 31, 2005, in preparation for renovations to the building.

In 1998 the building was sold to developer Robert K. Hall, who owned Daylight Properties. Hall later sold to building to the Bellingham Housing Authority in 2005, citing difficulties in renovation as reason for the sale. A renovation project by the Housing Authority was started in 2007 and was completed in 2008 for the cost of $5.5 million. The upper floors of the building were remodeled to 20 low income housing apartments, while two retail spaces opened on the ground floor.

The building was added to the National Register of Historic Places listings on August 29, 2003.

The two retail spaces on the ground floor are currently being occupied by a deli and a thrift store.
