= George H. Bacon House =

- U.S. National Register of Historic Places
- Location within Washington (state)
- Location: 2001 Eldridge Ave Bellingham, Washington
- Coordinates: 48°45′33″N 122°29′43″W
- Built: 1906
- Architect: Henry Bacon
- Architectural style: Classical Revival
- NRHP reference No.: 74001989
- Added to NRHP: November 21, 1974

George H. Bacon House, also known as the Bacon Home, is a historical structure located in Bellingham, Washington. It was designed by Henry Bacon for the owner George Hunt Bacon (1866–1937). Building of the house was started in 1905 and was completed in 1906.

== Background ==
George Bacon moved to the area in 1889 from Illinois. He worked in insurance and real estate with his partner, H. H. Ells. He also became active in the pollical scene of the city of Whatcom (now Bellingham) from 1894 to 1896. He was elected mayor Whatcom in 1901 and was the last mayor of the town before the city of Bellingham was established in 1904.

== History ==
The house was designed by Henry Bacon as a wedding present for his brother, George Bacon for his marriage to Mabel Donovan (1879–1958). Mabel and George were married on January 15, 1906. George and Mabel had three child who was raised in the house, two sons named Cecil Donovan Bacon and John Marshall Bacon and a daughter named Frances Bacon (née Roberts). George died of a heart attack on June 11, 1937. His remaining family moved out of the house the following year in 1938.

In February 1940, the house was listed for sale for the price for $4,500. The house was bought by Guy Baer Lowman and his wife Edith Junia Sahlin. He worked as a supervisor for Puget Sound Pulp & Timber Company. Lowman died on January 29, 1956. During the late 1950s, the house was bought by Dr. Irvin Murnane Cederlind and his wife Dorothy Jane Eldridge In 1961, a two car garage was added to the house and the bathroom was remodeled by Cederlind. By 1967 the house was occupied by Homer and Janet Weiner. Homer was an art professor at Western Washington University. In August of the same year, a small fire damaged the roof of the home. In 1969, Frances Bacon expressed her support of the house becoming a group home for boys. There was some pushback from the community against establishing the group home due to concerns about crime.

In 1972, the house became a court-appointed house for delinquent boys run by the Archdiocese of Seattle branch of the Catholic Church. The house had the capacity to hold 10 boys between the ages of 12 and 18. The Archdiocese spent about $25,000 repairing the house by 1978. The average stay at the house for each boy was about 9 months, with many returning home or entering foster care after their stay. By 1988, the house was the last remaining house for abused and neglected children in Whatcom County. Reason for closure was cited as financial losses, concerns over safety, and increasingly complicated psychiatric cases with the children referred to he home. On closure, there were 8 children who lived at the home. The house closed in 1990.

The house was added to the National Register of Historic Places on November 21, 1974. The house became a private residence in the 1990s and remains that way to current day.
