= Glacier Ranger Station =

- U.S. National Register of Historic Places
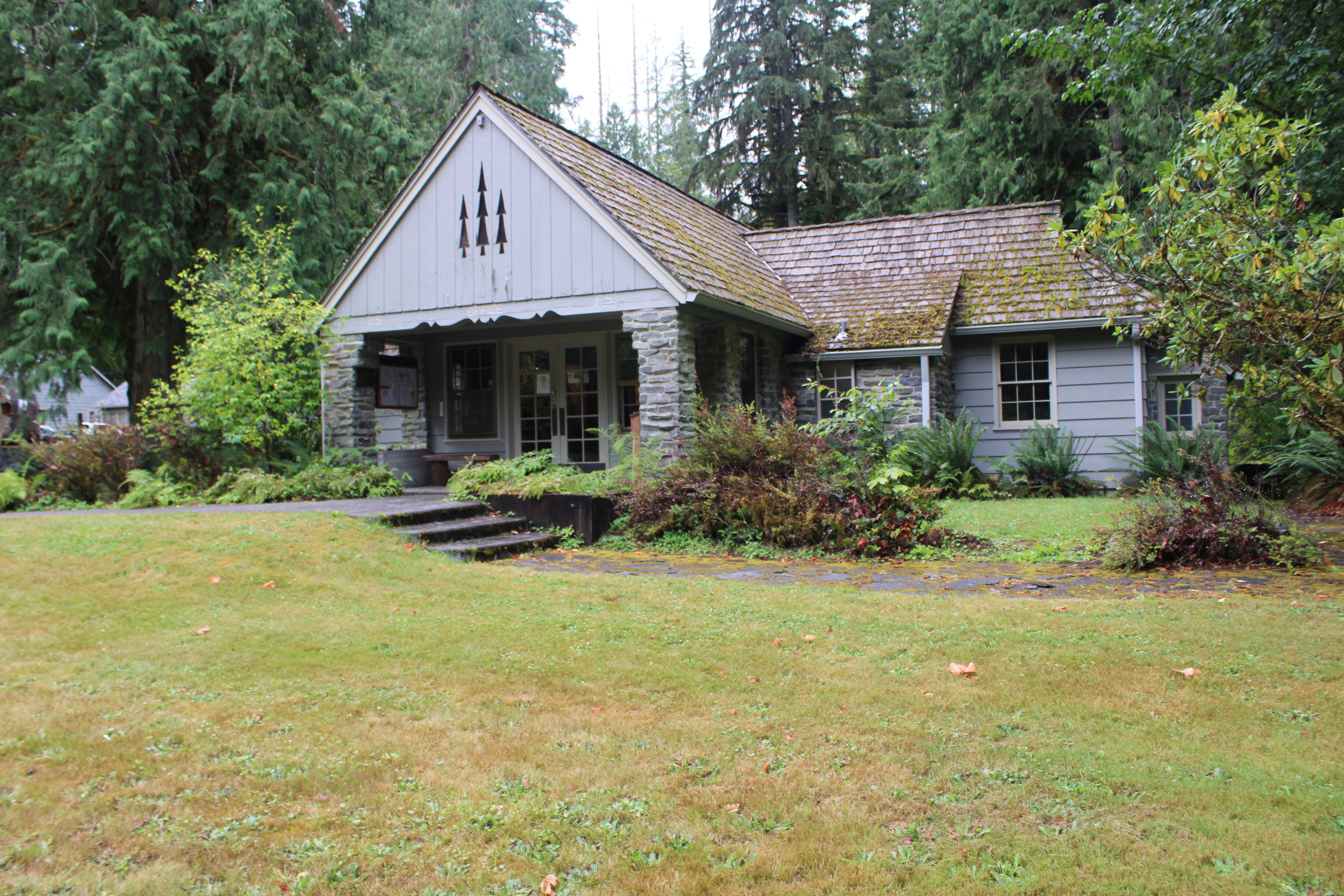
- Glacier Ranger Station, Mount Baker Nat'l Forest.

- Location within Washington (state)
- Location: Mount Baker Hwy., Glacier, Washington
- Coordinates: 48°53′16″N 121°56′07″W
- Area: less than one acre
- Built: 1938
- Architectural style: Alpine Bungalow
- MPS: Depression-Era Buildings TR (AD)
- NRHP reference No.: 80004013
- Added to NRHP: September 17, 1980

The Glacier Ranger Station is a park ranger office for the Glacier District of Baker National Forest in the U.S. state of Washington. Camp Glacier (F-12) was one of 70 Civilian Conservation Corps camps in Washington state, among the earliest states to establish them, and built the Glacier Ranger Station. It was established in June 1933. This is the second building to serve as the Glacier Ranger Station. The first site was taken from public land on March 16, 1908. The structure was demolished (1908–1931) when the Mount Baker Highway was built on its current right-of-way. Two other wood-frame buildings from the old complex were moved and altered and in use.

The ranger station was completed in 1938. There was a complement of 200 enrollees and 45 local experienced men (LEMS) at the camp working under 5 army officers. Several buildings built for the camp, at some distance from the station, are still in use as a summer church camp (Mt Baker Bibleway Camp) on the Mt. Baker highway. The work on the station took several months. Under the supervision of a journeyman mason the columnar basalt was quarried during the summer from deposits near Heather Meadows at the head of the Mt. Baker highway. It was trucked to the construction site where most of the laying was done by the mason. The framing, roofing, and finishing was done by men from the crew. The plans for the station were modified from standard building plans done during 1936 for the Forest Service and initiated L.A.F. The changes are an example of the way designs and material were improvised to limit expenses and utilize the available labor. The interior was remodeled in 1967, the exterior has not been altered. The Glacier Ranger Station, is a 'crafted example of CCC projects.

== Appearance ==
The Glacier Ranger Station is a detached structure. The single building floorplan has a central rectangular "block” with wings extending from the long sides. It is referred to as a four-room station on standard Forest Service plans, The single-story Alpine Bungalow style building is primarily of basalt masonry construction with wood frame wings on the east and west sides. The exterior masonry resembles shale but is thick enough to be near ashlar in appearance. The stone has a natural rustic texture. The sections of the wall not of masonry are sided with weatherboard. There is an exposed masonry chimney on the west side of the central block, just forward of the wing. It is offset by a six-foot extension opposite it on the east side. Together the chimney, extension, and square masonry columns flanking the main front entrance and at the end of the wings give the building a very solid cozy appearance.

The north facing main entrance is flanked by windows and is covered by the main gable end which extends 5 feet (1.5 m) to support columns in portico fashion. The gable end itself is decorated with scroll work and cut out tree designs. The roof shape is basically a central high gable met on each side by gabled wings which drop to sheds on the east and west ends. The roof covering is cedar shingle. The basalt masonry is repeated in the curbing and fencing used on the grounds of the station.

== Bibliography ==
- Jeffcott, P.R. Ghechaco and Sourdough.1963. Pioneer Printing Go. Bellingham, WA.
- Mount Baker Almanac 1950 U.S. Forest Service Historical Document
- Roth, Lottie Roeder, History of Whatcom County. 1926 Pioneer Historical Publishing, Seattle Bellingham *Herald Center for Pacific Northwest Studies, Canada House, Western Washington University
- Whatcom Museum of History and Art. The Mount Baker Book (Rare Book Collection)
