= Barlow Apartments =

Historic residential building in Arkansas, United States

- U.S. National Register of Historic Places
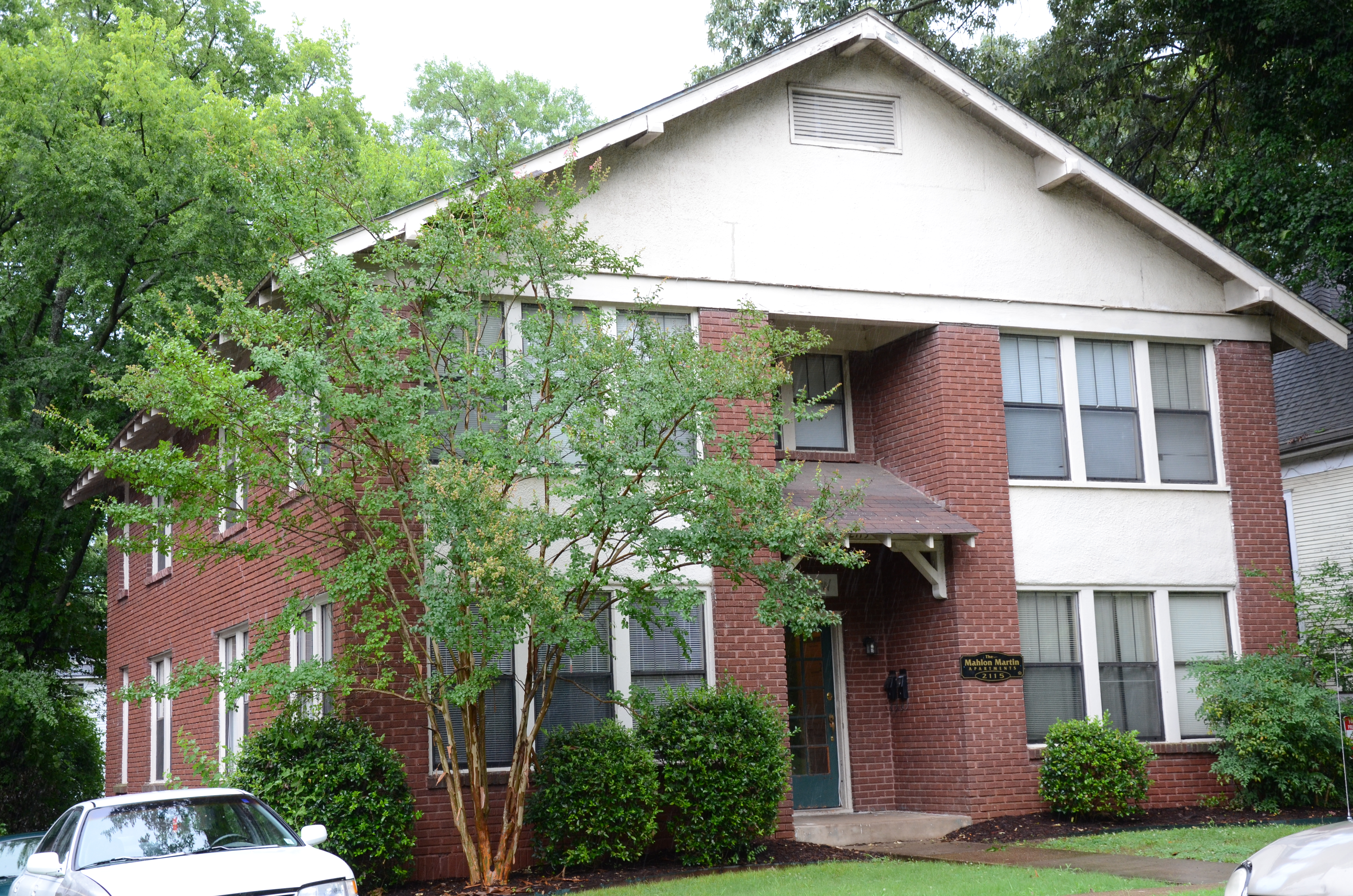

- Location within Arkansas Location within the United States
- Location: 2115 Scott St., Little Rock, Arkansas
- Coordinates: 34°43′44″N 92°16′19″W
- Area: less than one acre
- Built: 1921
- Architectural style: Bungalow/craftsman
- MPS: Little Rock Apartment Buildings MPS
- NRHP reference No.: 95000376
- Added to NRHP: April 7, 1995

The Barlow Apartments is a historic apartment house at 2115 Scott Street in Little Rock, Arkansas. Built in 1921, it is an early example of a vernacular Craftsman style four-unit apartment block. It is finished in a brick veneer, and has a broad gable roof with exposed rafter ends. It was built for Virgil M. Barlow, and was scaled to fit in well with its single-family residential neighbors.

The building was listed on the National Register of Historic Places in 1995.

== See also ==
- National Register of Historic Places listings in Little Rock, Arkansas
