= Dr. William H. and Frances C. Axtell House =

- U.S. National Register of Historic Places
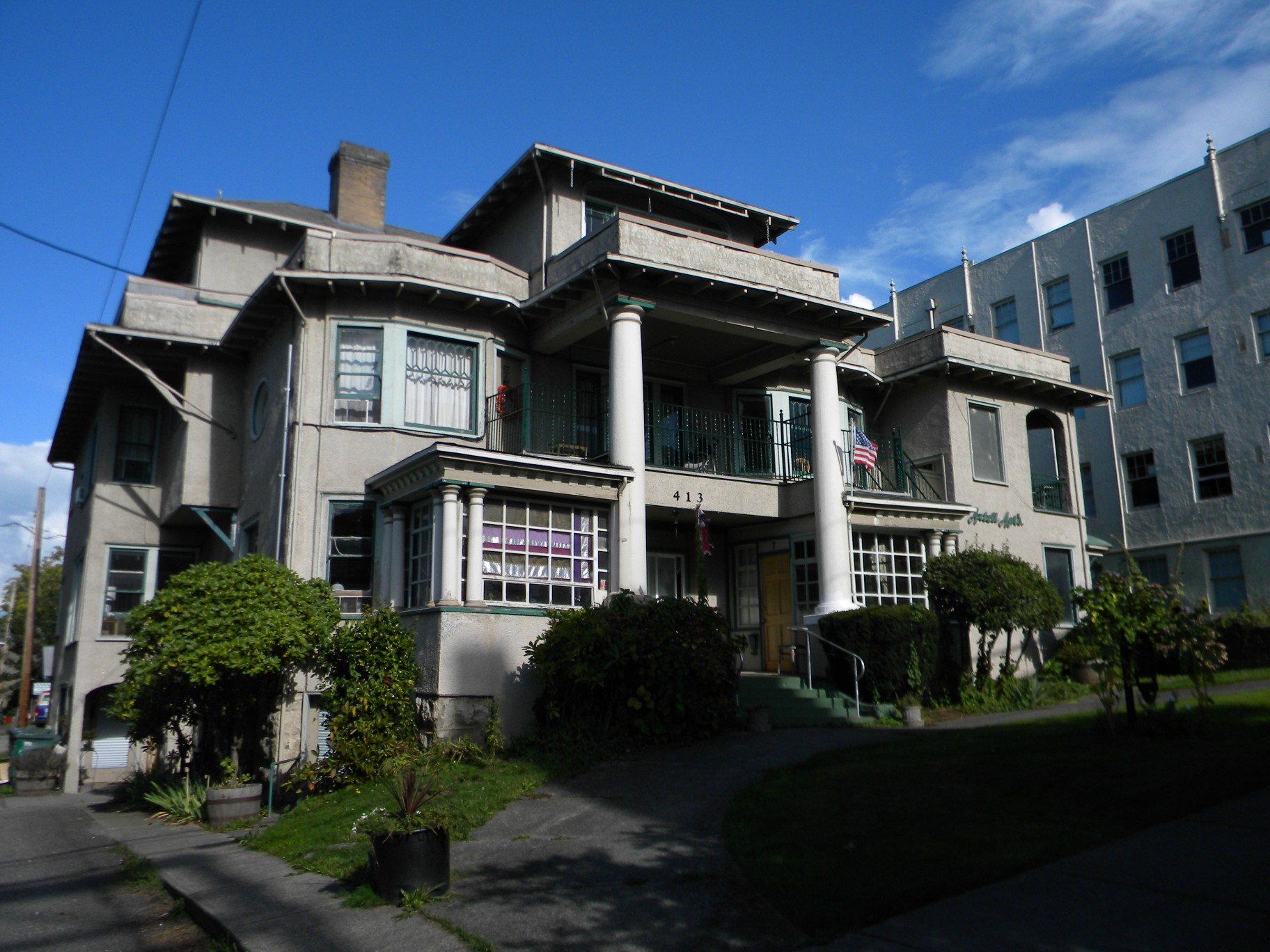
- William H. and Frances C. Axtell House

- Location within Washington (state)
- Location: 413 E. Maple St. Bellingham, Washington
- Coordinates: 48°44′44″N 122°28′41″W
- Built: 1902
- Built by: William H. Axtell & Frances C. Axtell
- Architectural style: Classical Revival
- NRHP reference No.: 12000087
- Added to NRHP: March 7, 2012

The Dr. William H. and Frances C. Axtell House, also known as the Axtell House, is a historic residence located at 413 E. Maple St. in historic Bellingham, Washington. The house was built by Frances Cleveland Axtell (1866–1953) and her husband William Henry Axtell (1863–1927). The Axtells moved to Bellingham from Illinois in 1894. Construction on the house was completed in 1902.

Between 1902 and 1942, the house served as a meeting spot for many of the local elite, including businessmen, politicians, and suffragettes who shared Frances' political ideals.

In 1926, the house was subdivided into eight different apartments. William died a year later in 1927. Frances continued living in the house until 1942, when she moved to Seattle to care for one of her daughters, dying there in 1953.

By 2011, the house was owned by local attorney Patrick Gallery. The house was added to the National Register of Historic Places on March 7, 2012.
