= Immanuel School of Industries-Department of Public Welfare =

- Immanuel School of Industries
- U.S. National Register of Historic Places
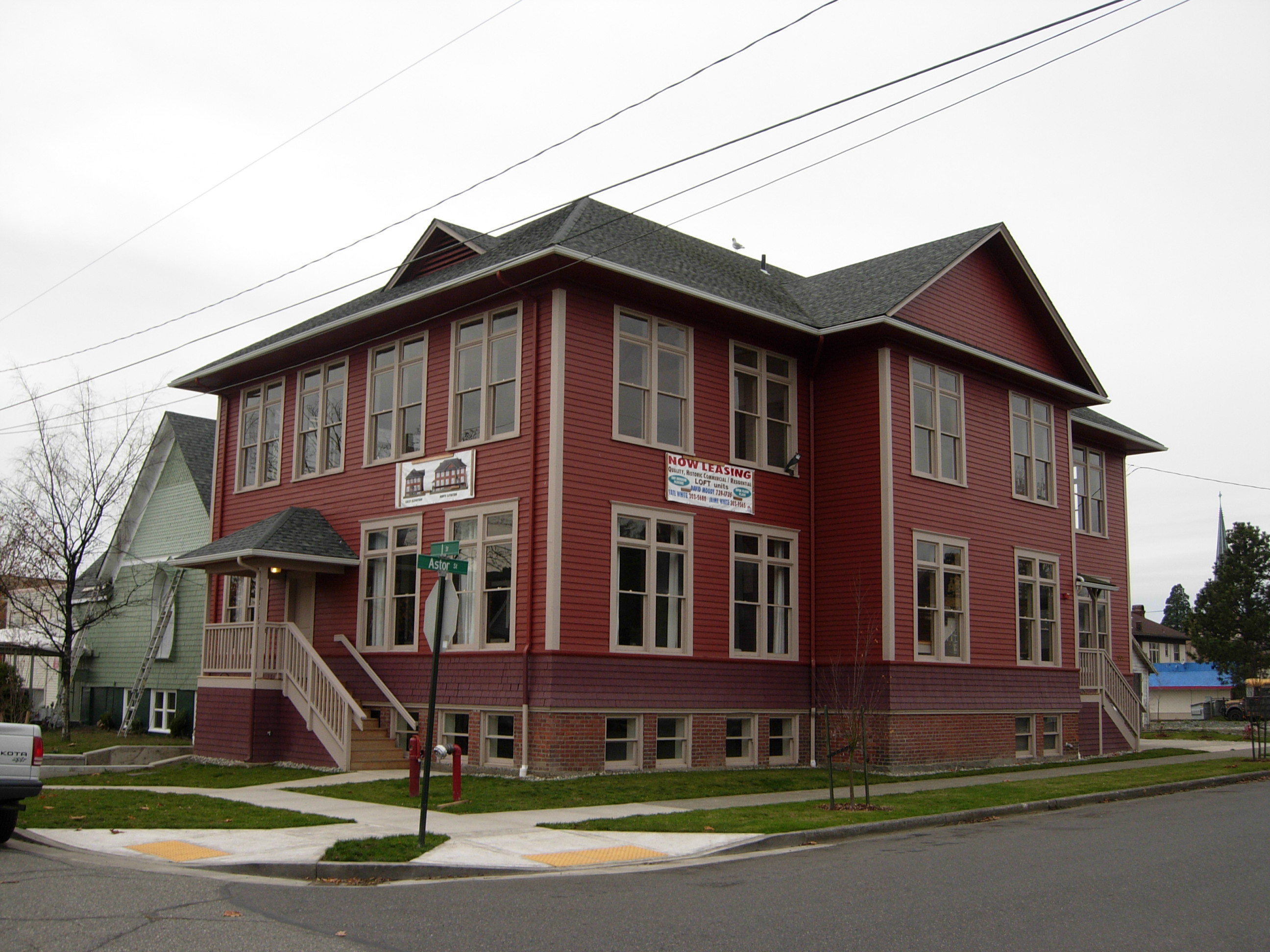

- Location within Washington (state)
- Location: 1303-1305 Astor St., 1315 I St., Bellingham, Washington
- Coordinates: 48°53′10″N 122°39′39″W
- Built: 1906
- NRHP reference No.: 03001127
- Added to NRHP: November 7, 2003

The Immanuel School of Industries, also known as I Street Relief Depot and Akers Taxidermy, is a historical building located in Bellingham, Washington. The building was completed in 1906.

== Background ==
The Immanuel School of Industries was established in January 1896 in association with the Immanuel Baptist church. The first class consisted of 18 pupils. Enrollment in the school was free and the students came from a number of different social classes. The school was co-ed and taught a variety of things, such as cooking, wood carving, leather making, clay modeling, basket weaving, and sewing. The school also offered a kindergarten for younger students which opened on September 10, 1904. Upon opening, the kindergarten was the only one in Bellingham. The school also occasionally offered classes to adults, such as dressmaking, for a fee. Before moving to the building on Astor street in 1906, the school met at the Knights of Pythias hall and the P.L.F clubhouse.

== History ==
Due to increased enrollment and lack of space for classes, a permit for a dedicated building was obtained in February 1905. The cost of the building was estimated to be about $7,000. The exterior of the building was completed in June 1906. The first floor held seven classrooms and the cooking department. The second floor contained the kindergarten and an auditorium. The basement was used for manual training. By 1908, enrollment in the school had risen to over 100.

The school began to experience financial issues in the late 1900s. In 1909, it was decided that the kindergarten would not re-open the next school year unless 40 students paid tuition. Since many students came from a lower economic background, raising funds for the school was difficult. The school was subsequently closed in 1916.

From 1916 to 1947, the building served as headquarters for many social agencies of Whatcom county, such as the Social Security and the Works Progress Administrations.

In January 1947 a local church took residence in the building, with the Reverend C.H Ford leading the church. The church also offered Sunday school. C.M Ruby became reverend of the church in September of 1950. In March 1969, the church began to construct a new building at Peabody street. In July of the same year the church moved service to Ferndale.

By August 1969, Akers Taxidermist had moved into the building from their old location at 1308 E. Street.

The building was added to the National Register of Historic Places on November 7, 2003.
