= Barlow Building =

- U.S. National Register of Historic Places
- Location within Washington (state)
- Location: 211 W. Holly St. Bellingham, Washington
- Coordinates: 48°45′2″N 122°28′52″W
- Built: 1892
- Architect: Jim Macy
- Architectural style: Revival
- NRHP reference No.: 04001371
- Added to NRHP: December 15, 2004

The Barlow Building is a historical building located in downtown Bellingham, Washington. The building was completed in 1892. It is one of the oldest and best examples of a single-story commercial buildings still standing in Bellingham's business district. It was added to the National Register of Historic Places in 2004.

== History ==
The building was commissioned by Philip Baum and opened in 1892 as a grocery store. The space was later taken over by Morgan & Matthes Grocery, run by Jenkin Morgan and Otto L. Matthes. The duo also owned another grocery store in the Fairhaven neighborhood. The store closed in 1904.

After this, the building became a saloon named The Crown, run by Eddie Anderson. Ownership of the bar later transferred to Michael Schneider. From 1909 to 1910, the bar was owned by Walter K. Martin. In 1910, the bar closed due to mounting pressures from the temperance movement in Washington.

The building was vacant until 1913 before it was bought by Clifford Barlow, who became the namesake of the building. Before moving to this building, he had previously operated his business at 307 Holly St. The store sold a number of leather specialty goods, such as luggage. Barlow remodeled the facade of the building in 1925, featuring marble and brick detailing that was common of art deco architecture. The roof of the building was repaired in 1929 and again in 1939. Barlow operated his business in the building before dying in 1954. The store closed in 1959.

The building was vacant until 1962, when the Bellingham Hardware Company moved in. By 1968, a beauty school named the Bellingham Beauty School operated in the building. The school was owned by Mike and Cis Kennard. In 1977, the roof was again remodeled. The beauty school remained as the tenant of the building until 2003, when it was bought by Daylight properties for $342,500. The beauty school relocated to a spot closer to Whatcom Community College. Daylight undertook major restoration efforts, restoring the art deco exterior of the building to how it looked according to a 1929 photograph.

The building was added to the National Register of Historic Places on December 15, 2004. From 2004 to 2016, a video rental store named Film is Truth operated from the building. In 2016, a restaurant named Goat Mountain Pizza opened in the space. The restaurant was founded in 2012 by owner Chas Kubis. In 2019, Goat Mountain closed when the building underwent renovations. A restaurant named Black Sheep, also owned by Kubis, expanded into the space. As of 2024, Black Sheep remains in this space.
