= Glacier, Washington =

- CDP
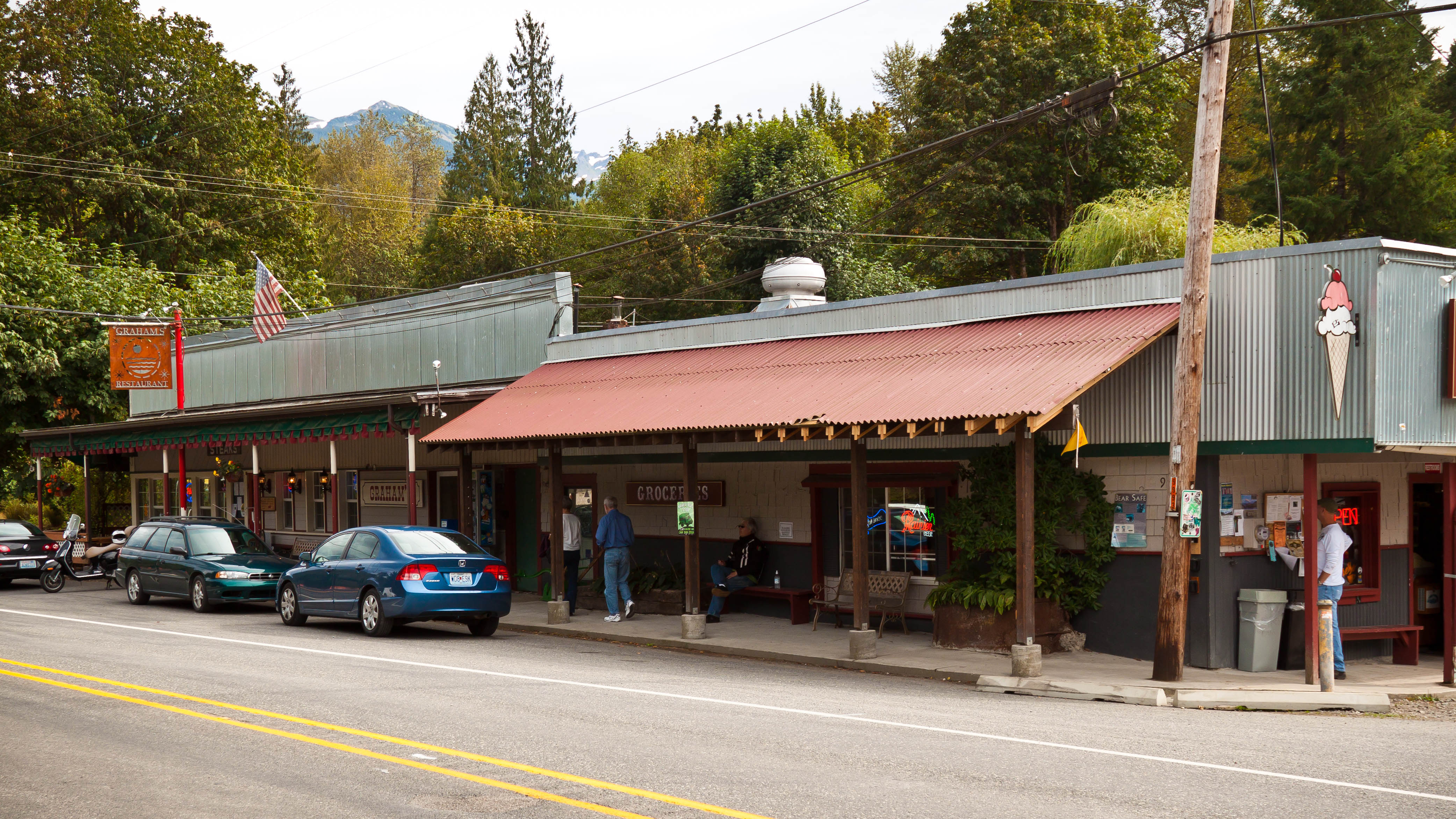

- Location of Glacier, Washington
- Coordinates: 48°53′27″N 121°56′06″W
- Country: United States
- State: Washington
- County: Whatcom

Area
  - Total: 3.0 sq mi (7.8 km^{2})
  - Land: 3.0 sq mi (7.8 km^{2})
  - Water: 0 sq mi (0.0 km^{2})
- Elevation: 988 ft (301 m)

Population (2020)
  - Total: 300
  - Density: 100/sq mi (38/km^{2})
- Time zone: UTC-8 (Pacific (PST))
  - Summer (DST): UTC-7 (PDT)
- ZIP Code: 98244
- Area code: 360, 564
- FIPS code: 53-26875
- GNIS feature ID: 2408296

Glacier is a census-designated place in the North Fork Nooksack River Valley, at an elevation of 906 ft., just 10 miles northwest of the Mount Baker Summit towering nearly 10,000 ft above it, in Whatcom County, Washington, United States. The population was 300 at the 2020 census.

Glacier is the community closest to Mt. Baker, and a 20-mile drive from the Mt. Baker Ski Area. The Glacier Public Service Center, staffed by both United States Forest Service and National Park Service personnel, is less than a mile east.

== History ==
Glacier was founded and named in 1909 by Jennie Vaughn.

Originally a site for gold mining and logging, commercial influence was probably the reason for both residential growth and interest by the Bellingham Bay and British Columbia Railroad. The area was made public after the creation of the Mount Baker Highway in 1923.

Glacier has recently seen growth in tourism and local businesses that cater to locals and travelers.

== Geography ==
According to the United States Census Bureau, the CDP has a total area of 3.0 square miles (7.8 km^{2}), all of it land.

== Demographics ==
Historical population
Census	Pop.	Note	%±
2000	90		—
2010	211		134.4%
2020	300		42.2%
U.S. Decennial Census; 1970 1980 1990; 2000 2010

Glacier first appeared as a census designated place in the 2000 U.S. census.

=== Racial and ethnic composition ===
Glacier CDP, Washington – Racial and ethnic composition Note: the US Census treats Hispanic/Latino as an ethnic category. This table excludes Latinos from the racial categories and assigns them to a separate category. Hispanics/Latinos may be of any race.
Race / Ethnicity (NH = Non-Hispanic)	Pop 2000	Pop 2010	Pop 2020	% 2000	% 2010	% 2020
White alone (NH)	89	198	270	98.89%	93.84%	90.00%
Black or African American alone (NH)	0	0	0	0.00%	0.00%	0.00%
Native American or Alaska Native alone (NH)	0	0	0	0.00%	0.00%	0.00%
Asian alone (NH)	0	0	2	0.00%	0.00%	0.67%
Native Hawaiian or Pacific Islander alone (NH)	0	1	0	0.00%	0.47%	0.00%
Other race alone (NH)	0	0	1	0.00%	0.00%	0.33%
Mixed race or Multiracial (NH)	0	7	10	0.00%	3.32%	3.33%
Hispanic or Latino (any race)	1	5	17	1.11%	2.37%	5.67%
Total	90	211	300	100.00%	100.00%	100.00%

=== 2000 census ===
As of the census of 2000, there were 90 people, 47 households, and 21 families residing in the CDP. The population density was 29.9 people per square mile (11.5/km^{2}). There were 228 housing units at an average density of 75.8/sq mi (29.2/km^{2}). The racial makeup of the CDP was 98.89% White, and 1.11% from two or more races. Hispanic or Latino of any race were 1.11% of the population.

There were 47 households, out of which 17.0% had children under the age of 18 living with them, 38.3% were married couples living together, 4.3% had a female householder with no husband present, and 55.3% were non-families. 46.8% of all households were made up of individuals, and 10.6% had someone living alone who was 65 years of age or older. The average household size was 1.91 and the average family size was 2.76.

In the CDP, the age distribution of the population shows 18.9% under the age of 18, 3.3% from 18 to 24, 32.2% from 25 to 44, 31.1% from 45 to 64, and 14.4% who were 65 years of age or older. The median age was 43 years. For every 100 females, there were 109.3 males. For every 100 females age 18 and over, there were 102.8 males.

The median income for a household in the CDP was $10,875, and the median income for a family was $7,212. Males had a median income of $10,000 versus $0 for females. The per capita income for the CDP was $6,089. There were 56.5% of families and 34.2% of the population living below the poverty line, including none under 18 and none of those over 64. Based on per capita income, Glacier ranks 522nd (last) of 522 areas in the state of Washington to be ranked.

== Education ==
The community is served by the Mount Baker School District.
