= Glover Road =

Road in Langley, Canada

- Part of: Highway 10
- Length: 11 km (6.8 mi)
- Location: Langley (city), Langley (township)
- South end: Fraser Highway
- Major junctions: Langley Bypass; Springbrook Road
- North end: Fraser River

Glover Road is a primary road in Langley, British Columbia which runs from southwest to northeast north–south from the Fraser Highway in downtown Langley to the Fraser River in Fort Langley, travelling over British Columbia Highway 1 and through the community of Milner, British Columbia. The road is 11 km (7 mi) in length and mostly two lanes wide with some divided four lane sections. It is notable as the primary road in and to the village of Fort Langley and as being concurrent for some of its length with British Columbia Highway 10 (from Langley Bypass to Springbrook Road). Beyond Fort Langley, it crosses the Jacob Haldi Bridge onto McMillan Island and terminates at the decommissioned Albion Ferry dock within the lands of the Kwantlen First Nation. The Glover Road overpass is a six-span, two-lane structure permitting access across Trans-Canada Highway. The underpass received an overheight-warning system, the second in the province, following damage from three collisions in three years.

== History ==
Before the construction of Glover Road, a path following a similar route was used by the local First Nations as a portage between the Salmon and Nicomekl rivers. With the arrival of European settlement, the route became known as Smuggler's Trail, which ran from Fort Langley to what was then known as Langley Prairie and is now the location of the City of Langley. It was later known as Langley Trunk Road, before being renamed to Glover Road.

The City of Langley's coat of arms symbolizes the historic crossroads of Glover Road, Old Yale Road and the horizontal British Columbia Electric Railway. The blue star of Innes in the centre of the crossroads reflects the original name of this crossroads - "Innes Corners", after the prominent pioneer and landowner, Adam Innes.

Today, Glover Road parallels to a great extent the Southern Railway of British Columbia. Its northern terminus was at the Albion Ferry on McMillan Island until 2009, when the ferry ceased operating. Trinity Western University's main campus and the Fort Langley Railroad Museum are located on Glover Road. The Fort Langley portion provides access to a variety of shops, antique stores and galleries, many of which are housed in heritage buildings.

== Transit ==
Translink's 562 route, which serves the neighbourhoods of Walnut Grove, Fort Langley, Milner, and the City of Langley, runs for much of its route along Glover Road. The 372 route also runs along Glover Road within the City of Langley, and the Langley Centre transit exchange is located at the intersection of Glover Road and Logan Avenue in the City of Langley, providing regional connections.

== Major intersections ==
Location	km	mi	Destinations	Notes
Langley (City)	0.0	0.0	Fraser Highway / 204 Street	Continues south as 204 Street
Langley (City)	1.1	0.68	Highway 1A / Highway 10 west (Langley Bypass) – Surrey	South end of Hwy 10 concurrency
Langley (Township)	1.7	1.1	Mufford Crescent	
Langley (Township)	4.8	3.0	Highway 10 east (Springbrook Road) to Highway 1 (TCH) – Vancouver, Hope	North end of Hwy 10 concurrency
Langley (Township)	5.9	3.7	University Drive	Roundabout; access to Trinity Western University
Langley (Township)	7.4	4.6	Rawlison Crescent (to 232 Street)	Alternate access to Hwy 1
Langley (Township)	8.6	5.3	88 Avenue	Enters Fort Langley
Langley (Township)	9.6	6.0	Mavis Avenue	Access to Fort Langley National Historic Site
Langley (Township)	9.8	6.1	Jacob Haldi Bridge crosses Bedford Channel (Fraser River) onto McMillan Island	
Langley (Township)	10.8	6.7	Albion Ferry (closed)	
1.000 mi = 1.609 km; 1.000 km = 0.621 mi: Closed/former; Concurrency terminus
