= Nicomekl River =

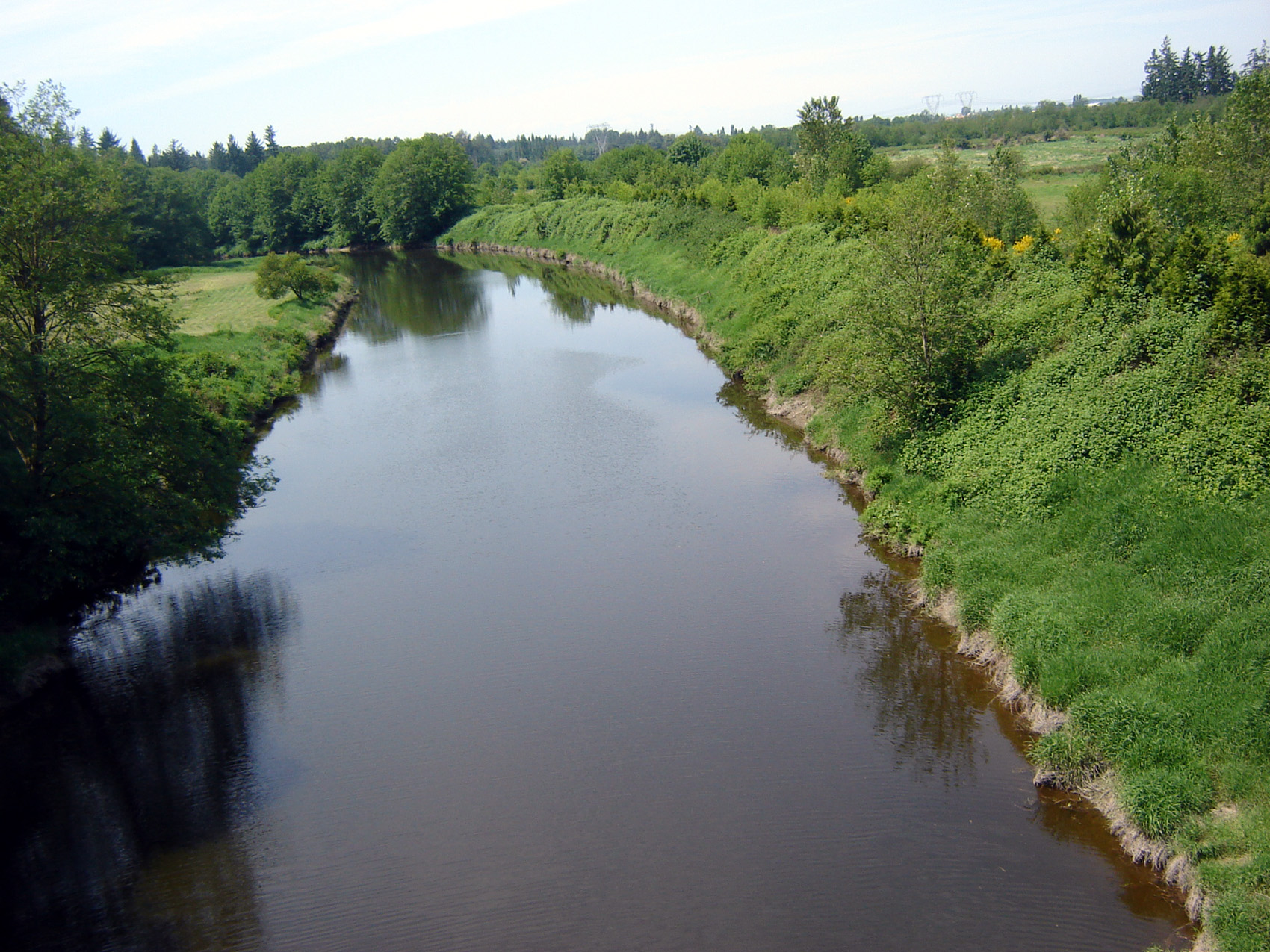
- Nicomekl River, May 2006, looking west from 152nd St. Surrey, BC

Location
- Country: Canada
- Province: British Columbia

Physical characteristics
- Source: Langley
  - location: Lower Mainland
- Mouth: Mud Bay
  - location: Boundary Bay
  - coordinates: 49°3′28″N 122°52′10″W
  - elevation: 4 m (13 ft)
- Length: 34 km (21 mi)
- Basin size: 149 km^{2} (58 sq mi)

The Nicomekl River springs from the ground in Langley, British Columbia and travels west through the city to Surrey's Crescent Beach, where it empties into Mud Bay, the northernmost section of the Boundary Bay of the Strait of Georgia. It has a total length of 34 km, with a drainage area of 149 km^{2}.

== History and origins ==
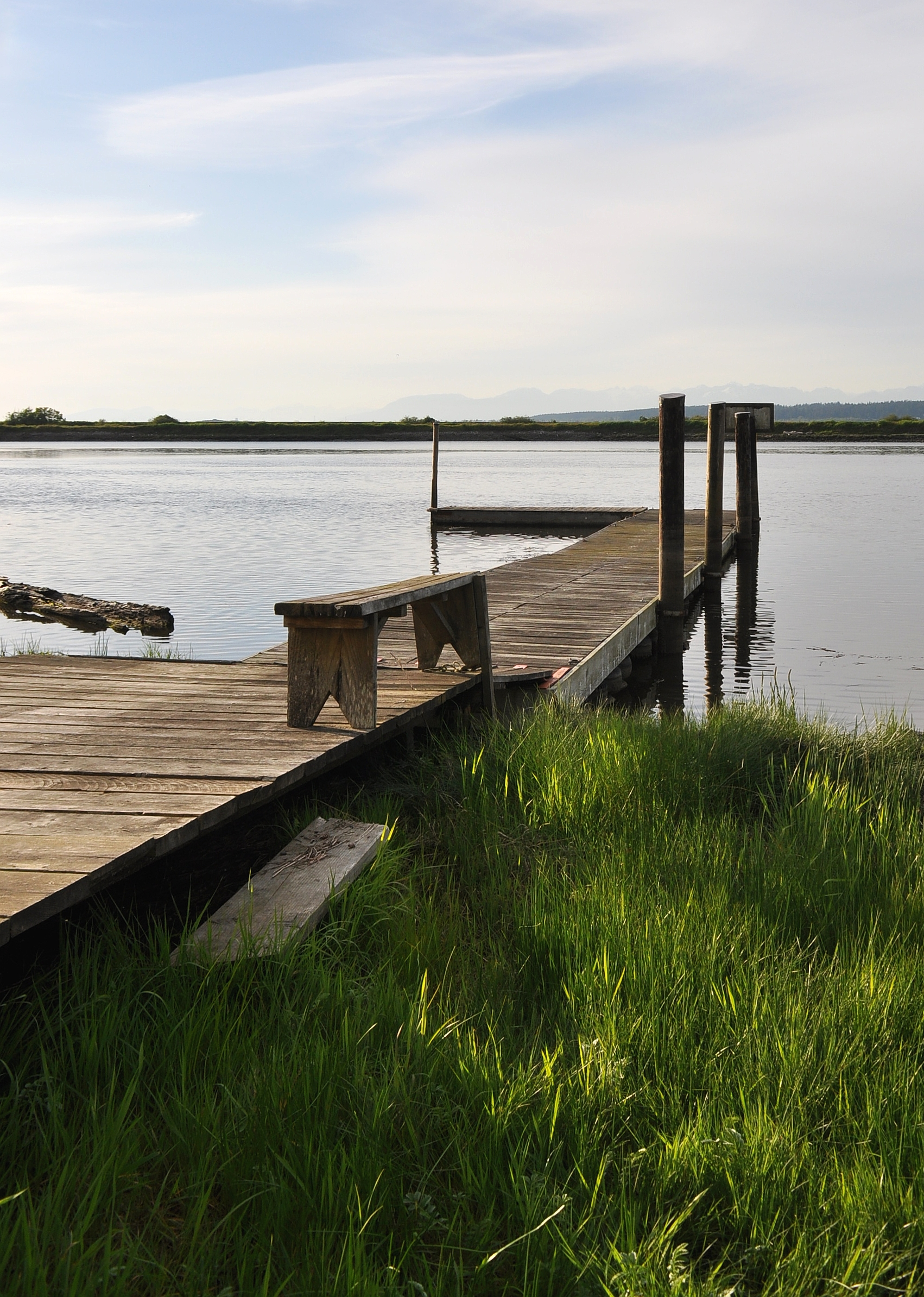
Pier on the river, close to the point where it enters Mud Bay

The word Nicomekl is from the Halq'emeylem used by the Stó:lō people, meaning "the route to go" or "the pathway." The area from Mud Bay, British Columbia along the Nicomekl river, and portage area to the Salmon River and Derby, British Columbia was once occupied by Snokomish people, who were largely wiped out by a smallpox epidemic in the 18th century. Surviving members joined the surrounding Kwantlen, Katzie and Semiahmoo peoples.

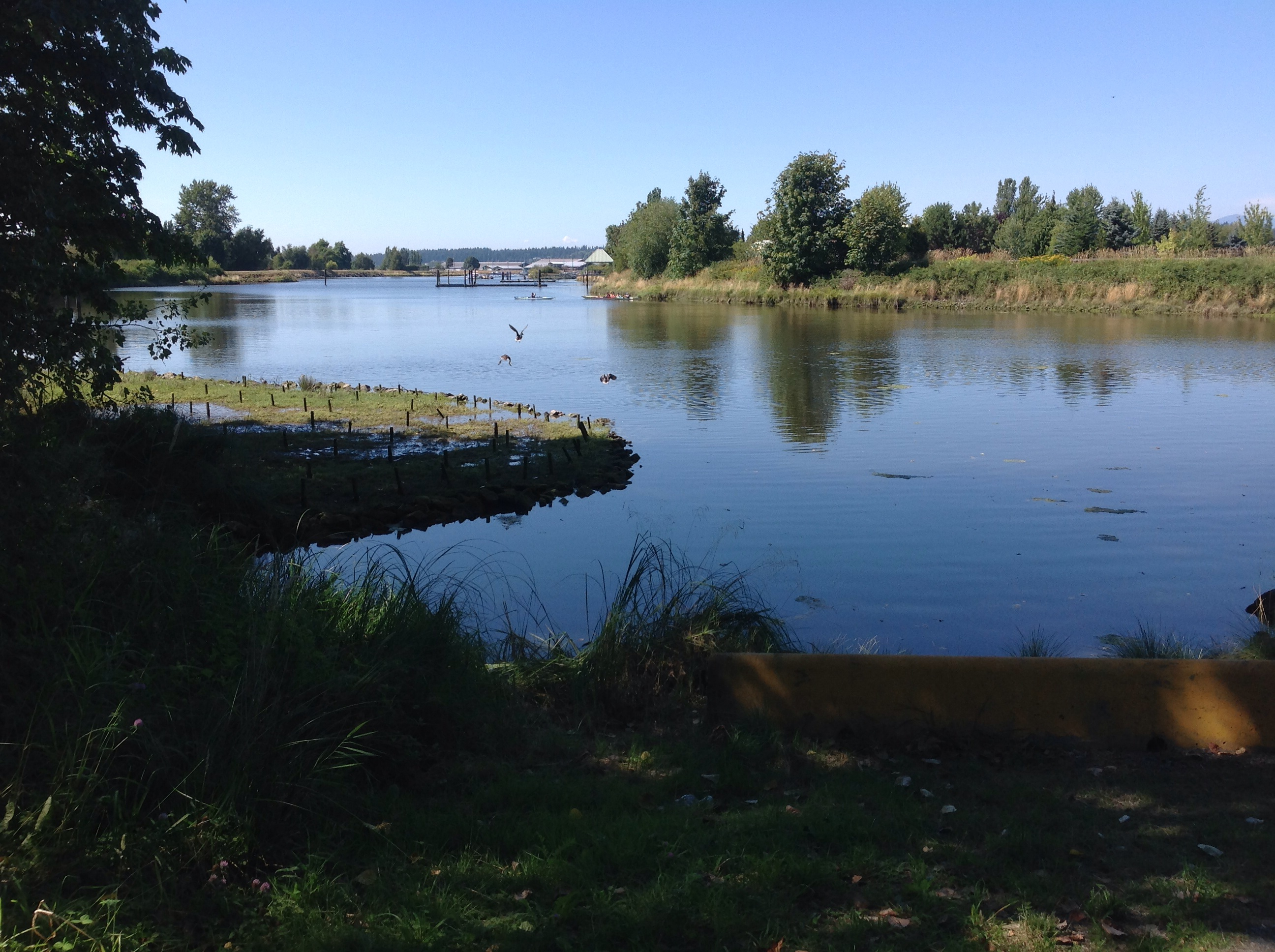
West-facing view of Nicomekl River towards its joining with Mud Bay

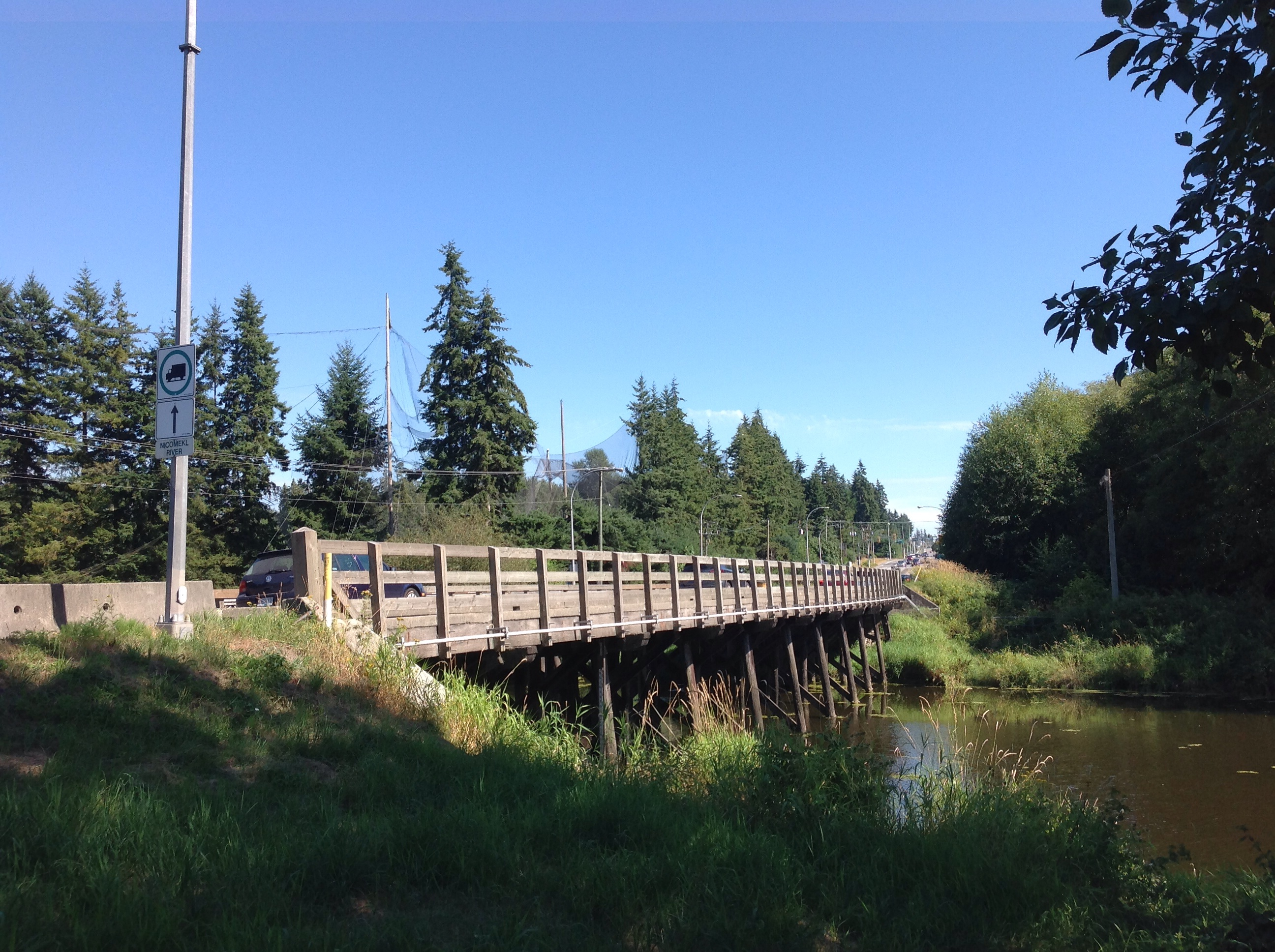
King George Boulevard (Highway 99A) wooden bridge over Nicomekl River in South Surrey

The river was first documented in writing on December 13, 1824, when James McMillan's Hudson's Bay Company expedition used the Nicomekl River to travel inland. They went up the Nikomekl to the portage area to the Salmon River which connected to the Fraser River 50 miles inland. McMillan built the first Fort Langley at that location two and a half years later. John Work, a clerk with the party, described the Nicomekl as thick with willows and with low banks "well wooded with pine, cedar, alder and some other trees." Work also noted signs of there being numerous beavers on the river.

Nicomekl was more navigable than other nearby rivers making it important to Surrey pioneers.

In 1911, Surrey council barred navigation up the Nicomekl and Serpentine rivers due to construction of dams to reclaim land. This ended use of the rivers by steamboats and log booms.

In December 1951, high tides up the Nicomekl and Serpentine rivers combined with gale-force winds to flood 490 hectares of farmland under 1.5 metres of salt water. Repairs cost about $20,000, and the salt residue affected farm production for a few years. In the 1960s, river pollution caused the closure of thriving oyster farming businesses.

== Tributaries (listed from the mouth up) ==
- Chantrell Creek
- Anderson Creek
- Muckle Creek
- Pleasantdale Creek
- Langley Creek
- Newlands Brook

== See also ==
- List of rivers of British Columbia
