= Forest Knolls, British Columbia =

Forest Knolls
- Neighbourhood
- Interactive map of Forest Knolls
- Coordinates: 49°08′53″N 122°34′56″W
- Country: Canada
- Province: British Columbia
- Region: Lower Mainland
- Regional district: Greater Vancouver
- District Municipality: Langley, British Columbia (district municipality)
- Time zone: UTC-8 (Pacific (PST))
  - Summer (DST): UTC-7 (PDT)
- Area codes: 604, 778, 236

Forest Knolls is a neighbourhood in the Township of Langley in the Fraser Valley of British Columbia, Canada. It is located immediately south of Fort Langley. It is an affluent community of homes situated on small acreages.

== Location ==
Forest Knolls is located in the north-central portion of the Township of Langley. The Salmon River lies adjacent, with farms surrounding the remaining sides.

Forest Knolls, British Columbia

== History ==
The neighbourhood was formerly forest and farmland before being urbanized in the 1960s and 1970s. It was originally marketed as the Stanley Park of the Fraser Valley in reference to the large number of evergreen trees located throughout the area. The historical Telegraph Trail traversed the area the neighbourhood is now located in.

The area was home to eccentric British Columbian and former consul general of Monaco in Canada, Fritz Ziegler. Mr. Ziegler had constructed a replica 16th Century castle in which he resided. Although the castle was demolished in the late 2000s, an adjacent nature path - the Ziegler Trail - is named after Mr. Ziegler.

== Transportation ==
The neighbourhood is bounded by Glover Road and 232nd Street. British Columbia Highway 1 and British Columbia Highway 10 are located to the southeast.

The Canadian Pacific Railway runs just south of the community on the former BC Electric Railway track.
