= Statue of James Douglas =

- Subject: James Douglas
- Location: Fort Langley National Historic Site; Fort Langley, British Columbia, Canada; 49°10′05″N 122°34′23″W

A statue of James Douglas is installed outside the Fort Langley National Historic Site in Fort Langley, British Columbia, Canada.
