= James McMillan (fur trader) =

Canadian fur trader and explorer

1st Chief Trader of Fort Langley
- In office 1827–1828
- Succeeded by: Archibald McDonald

Personal details
- Born: August 1783 Probably in Glen Pean, Scotland
- Died: 26 January 1858 (aged 74) Glasgow, Scotland
- Parents: Allan McMillan (father); Margaret Cameron (mother)
- Occupation: Fur Trader, Explorer, First Chief Trader of Fort Langley
- Known for: Founder of Fort Langley

James McMillan (August 1783–26 January 1858) was a fur trader and explorer for the North West Company and Hudson's Bay Company. He led some of the earliest surveys of the lower Fraser River and founded Fort Langley for the HBC in 1827, and was its first Chief Trader.

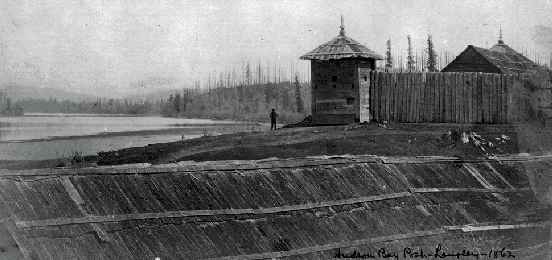
Fort Langley c. 1862

== Early life and first Fraser River expedition ==
Born in August, 1782, McMillan was the fourth son of Allan McMillan, Tacksman of Glenpean, Argyllshire and his wife, Margaret Cameron from Rannoch, Perthshire. With his parents and siblings, he emigrated from Scotland to British North America in 1802, and settled with them initially in what became Glengarry County, Ontario. Not long after arriving, the young James began work as a clerk for the North West Company in what is now Saskatchewan. Notably, he joined David Thompson's 1808 North West Company expedition west across the Rocky Mountains. During 1812 he led operations at Spokane House, competing against the nearby Pacific Fur Company station Fort Spokane. Later, he assisted in purchasing the PFC assets, which besides Fort Spokane included its headquarters of Fort Astoria and Fort Okanogan. These latter two stations would be utilised by the NWC, with Fort Astoria being renamed Fort George in honor of George III of the United Kingdom.

In June 1824, following the merger of the North West Company and the HBC, McMillan accompanied HBC Governor George Simpson from York Factory far west to the lower Columbia River, arriving at Fort George on November 8 of that year. Simpson described McMillan as a "Staunch & Manly Friend and Fellow Traveller". Ten days later, Simpson assigned McMillan with commanding an expedition to survey the mouth of the Fraser River and assess it for navigability, settlement potential and agricultural suitability. He led an exploration party of 40 men from Fort George to Puget Sound and on to Mud Bay, just east of present-day Point Roberts. On local advice of a shortcut, McMillan's party proceeded east up the Nicomekl River through what is now South Surrey, British Columbia where they portaged over to the Salmon River in order to finally reach the Fraser. The expedition traveled and surveyed up the Fraser River as far as Hatzic Slough, before returning to Fort George.

== Founding of Fort Langley ==
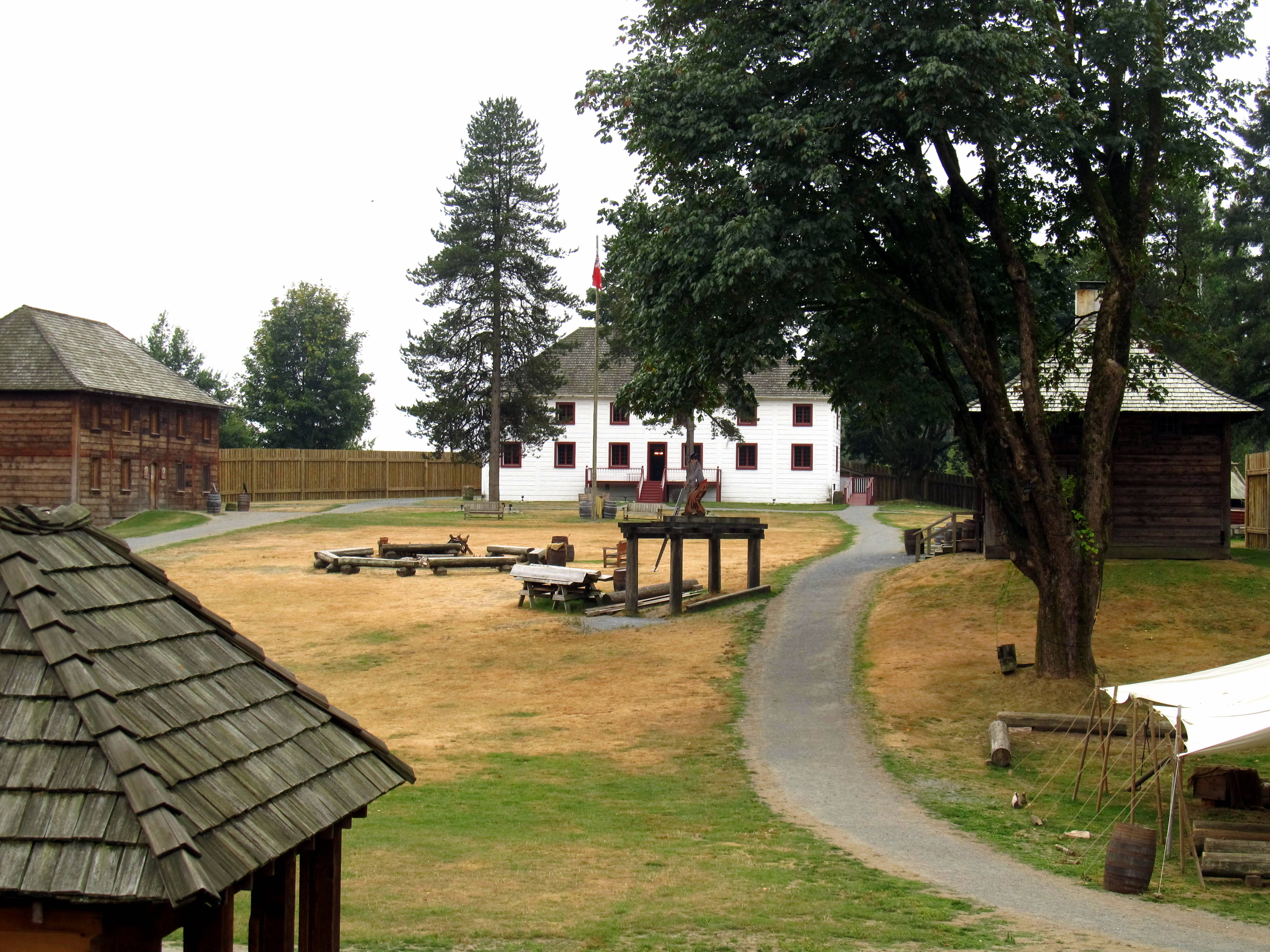
A recreation of Fort Langley

On June 27, 1827, McMillan was again dispatched north from the Columbia River by Simpson, this time to establish a Hudson's Bay Company presence on the lower Fraser River. After leaving Fort Vancouver, McMillan, his 25-man party and two small boats arrived at Port Orchard on Puget Sound on July 4. There they camped, awaiting the newly acquired HBC sailing vessel the Cadboro, loaded with horses and supplies, which had departed Fort Vancouver on June 24 to rendezvous with McMillan's party via the open Pacific Ocean. After waiting six days, the Cadboro finally arrived at Port Orchard on July 10. When the ship approached the mouth of the Fraser River, McMillan set out looking for suitable locations for the establishment of the Fort. He found none in the immediate vicinity of the river's mouth and the Cadboro was unable to gain navigable access to the Fraser River for several days until a channel was discovered. Meanwhile, in the smaller boats, and proceeding further up river, McMillan surveyed several potential locations for the new fort on July 27–28. It was around this time that McMillan Island was named for him. Other islands named during this survey of the river were Barnston Island (for clerk George Barnston) and Annacis Island (for Clerk Francois Noel Annance). Unfortunately, the Cadboro was unable to weigh anchor close enough to shore to safely unload cargo at the site McMillan had preferred to establish the Fort. The next day it sailed downriver to another spot on the south side of the Fraser, which McMillan had remarked upon earlier. This location was just west of the Salmon River's confluence with the Fraser in an area later to be known as Derby. On Monday July 30, McMillan's party unloaded horses at the site and the laborious clearance of the forest commenced. The first post of the Fort was cut on August 1, 1827. On August 13, the first bastion of the fort—deemed to be the priority as a consequence of rumours of a pending massacre by Indians—was completed.

== Chief Factor at Fort Langley (1827-1828) ==
In the weeks and months immediately following the erection of the Fort, McMillan watched as the horses perished in the wilderness conditions, noted a minor earthquake, and described the scene around the Fort once as "dull and monotonous." However, on Christmas Eve, 1827, a surprise visit was paid by HBC clerk Alexander Mackenzie from Fort Vancouver. His party having been pinned in by ice at the mouth of the Fraser River, and apparently robbed and threatened by the Musqueam, Mackenzie dispatched a sympathetic Kwantlen to convey a distress message to McMillan at Fort Langley. Upon receiving the message, McMillan sent an armed party to recover Mackenzie who was later greeted at the fort by a beaming McMillan. Following a celebratory holiday fueled by liquor recently delivered to the Fort, McMillan opted to return to Fort Vancouver with Mackenzie and show off Fort Langley's haul of 1,200 furs. However, stranded at Point Roberts in stormy weather for 10 days, McMillan returned to Fort Langley with the furs, while Mackenzie and his group continued onto Fort Vancouver. Rumour soon reached McMillan that Mackenzie's party had been massacred on the shores of Puget Sound en route back to the Columbia River, which later proved true. In October 1828, McMillan was transferred out of Fort Langley by Sir George Simpson. It is unclear whether he requested the transfer or was assigned elsewhere. He was replaced by Archibald McDonald.

== Red River Colony, personal life and final years ==
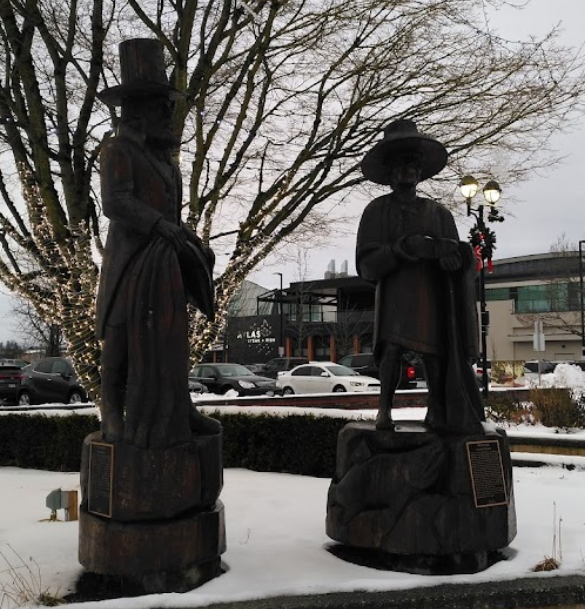
Wooden Statues of Chief Wattlekainen and James McMillan at the Innes Corners Plaza in Langley

McMillan went on to become a Chief Factor at the HBC's Red River Colony, and he was brought in to manage a failed experimental farm at St. James on the Assiniboine River. In his efforts, he even enlisted a cousin, Robert Campbell from Scotland to assist on the farm with such endeavours as trying to raise sheep from Kentucky. Later, he was transferred to the Montreal area out of frustration with the farm's failure and his dislike of Red River Colony society. In 1839, McMillan retired to Scotland, near Perth, where he lived with his Scottish wife (and first cousin), Eleanor McKinlay, with whom he had eight children. He also fathered at least four North American children stemming from relations with native women from the Columbia Region, Saskatchewan and Fort George. One of them, William McMillan, was a co-signatory to the Métis petition for special status, 1845. In his final years, McMillan contributed to Simpson's Narrative of a journey round the world, during the years 1841 and 1842, and kept apprised of events in the fur trade through Simpson and others. He died in 1858 in Glasgow, Scotland.

a Wooden Statue of McMillan and Chief Wattlekainen is located at the Innes Corners Plaza in Langley
