= Donald Manson (fur trader) =

Canadian fur trader (1796–1880)

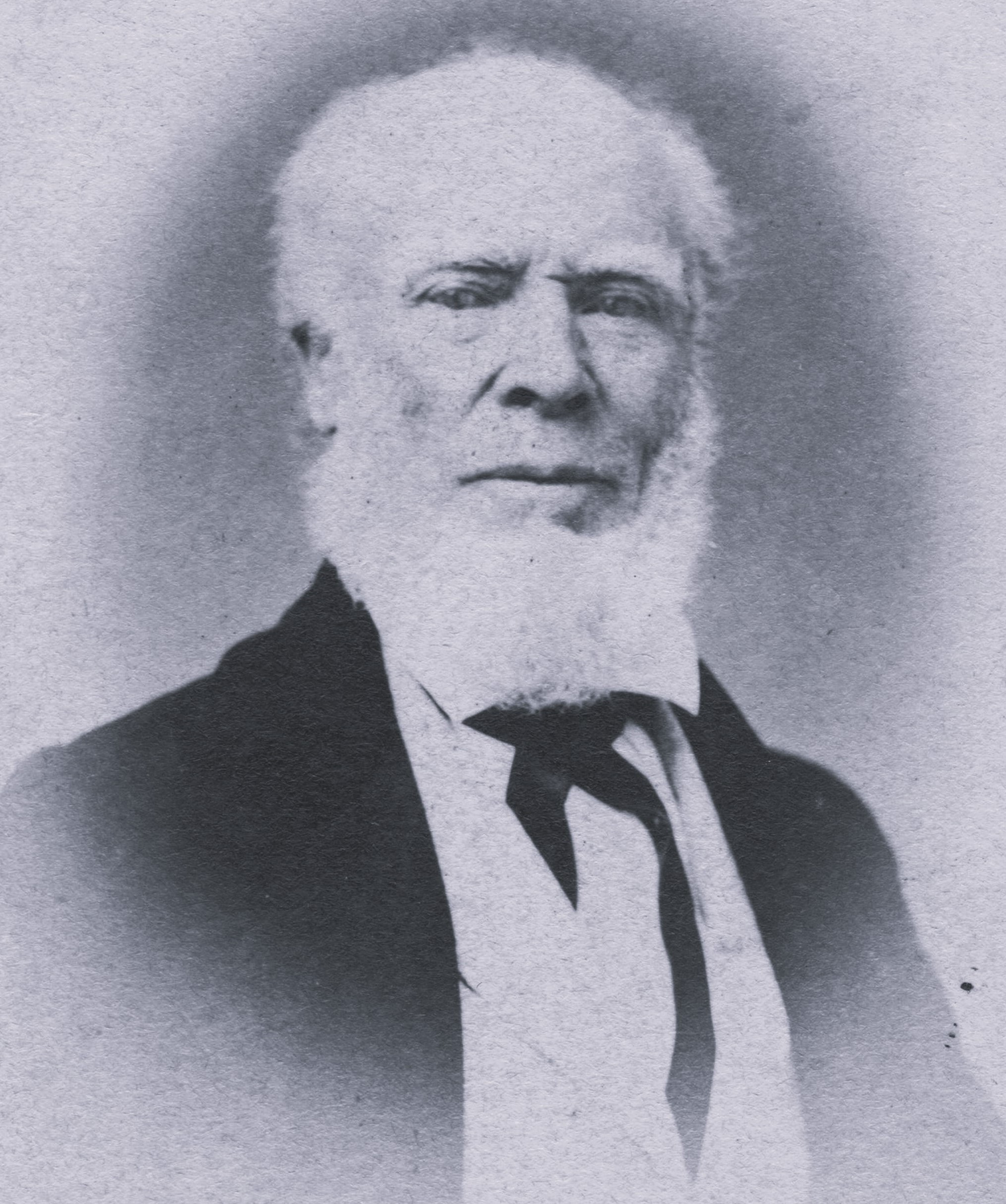
- Portrait of Donald Manson, chief trader, Hudson's Bay Company
- Born: 6 April 1796; Thurso, Scotland
- Died: 7 January 1880 (aged 59–60); Champoeg, Oregon
- Occupations: fur trader, chief trader, pioneer
- Spouse: Félicité Lucier
- Children: 8

Donald Manson (1796–1880) was a Scottish-Canadian fur trader of the Hudson's Bay Company and a pioneer of British Columbia. He was the founder, along with Chief Factor James McMillan and metis François Annance, of Fort Langley, British Columbia.

== Biography ==
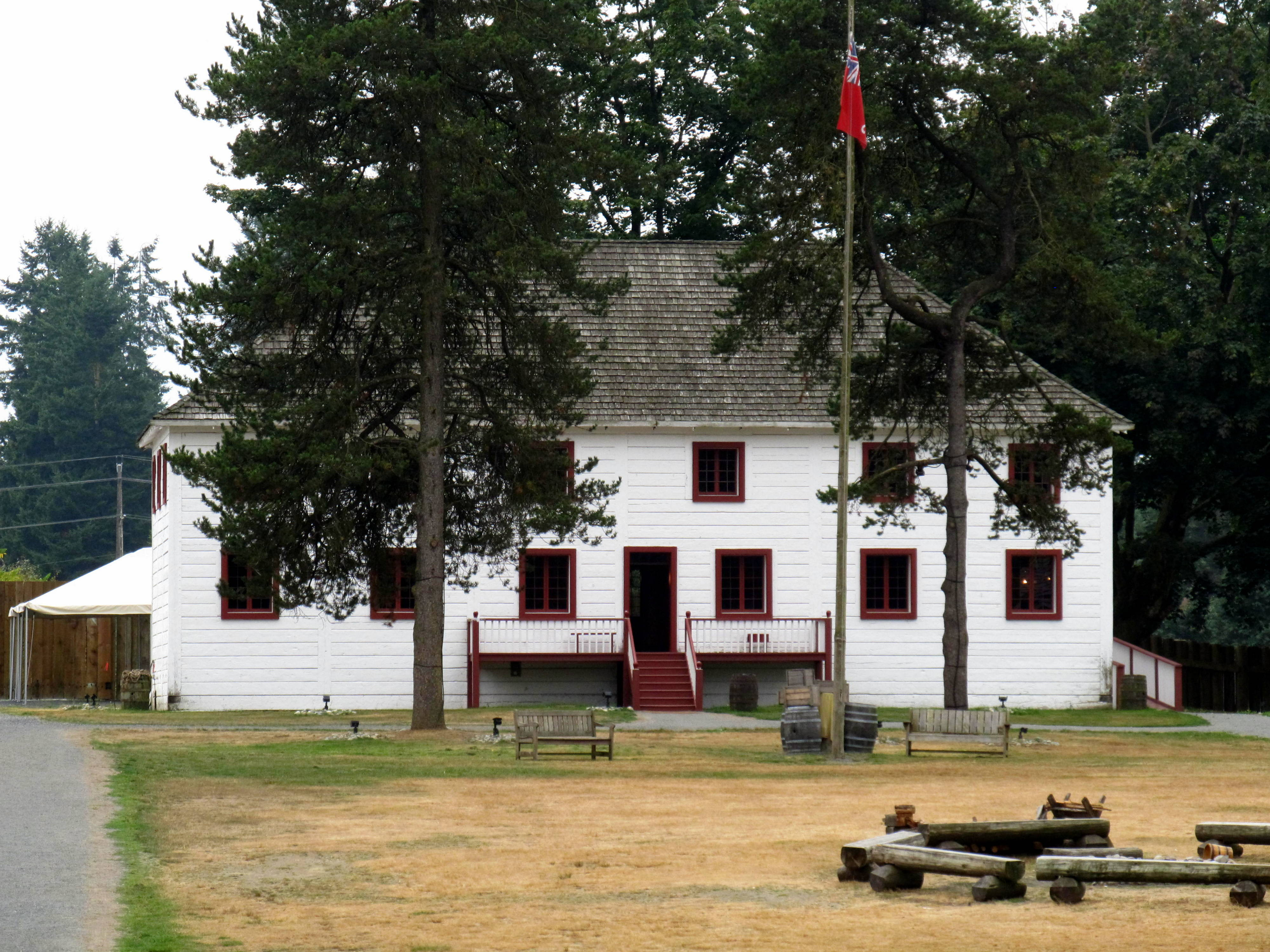
The commander's house at Fort Langley

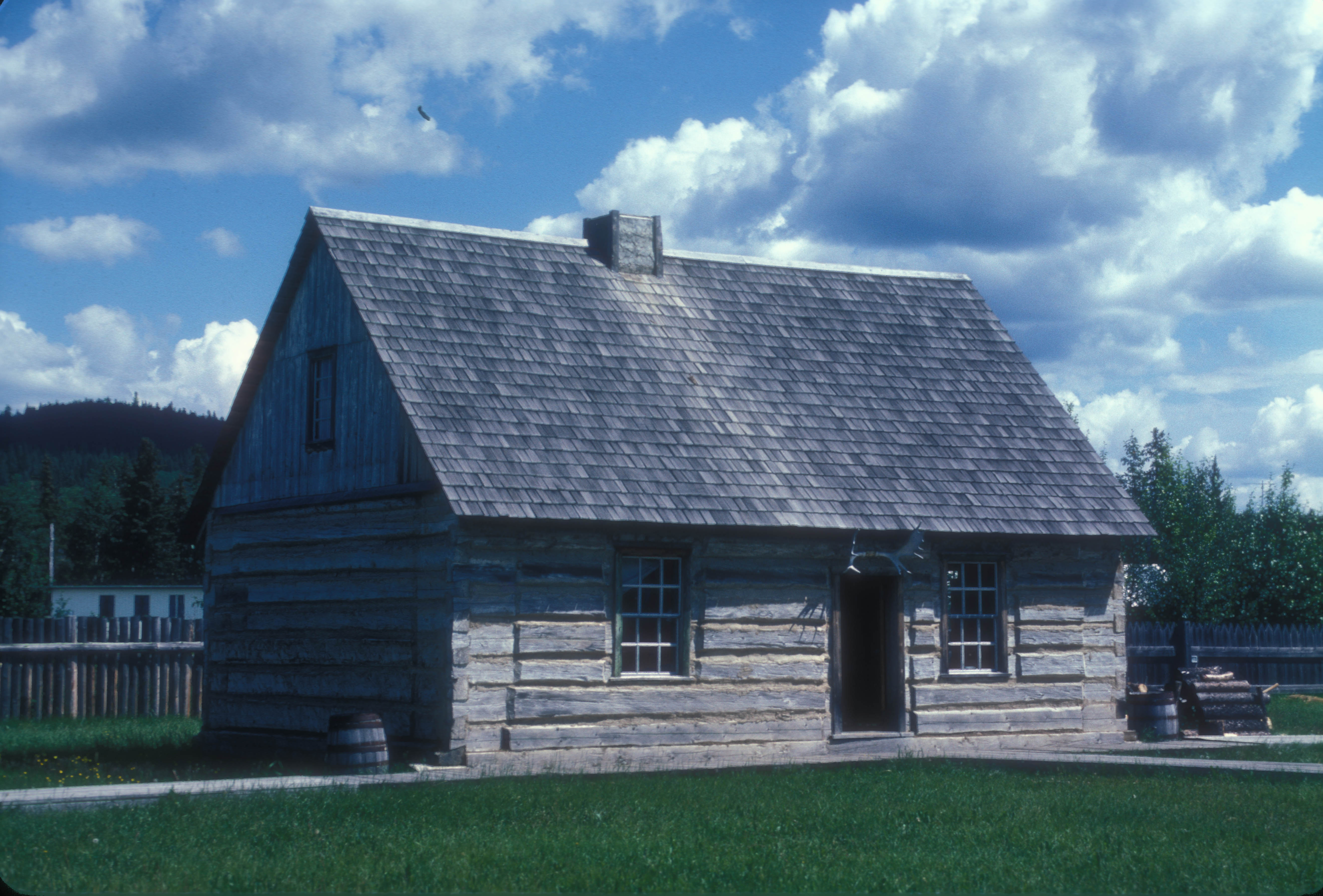
The men's house at Fort St. James

Donald Manson was born on April 6, 1796, at Thurso Caithness, Scotland, the son of David Manson and Jean Gunn. Donald Manson started his career in the Hudson's Bay Company, seated in Montreal, Canada, around 1817. He was sent to Rock Depot in Manitoba, and worked at various posts for the company. By 1822, he joined the expeditions of Gov. Donald McKenzie, a past of associate of John Jacob Astor, to Missouri and Saskatchewan. Manson thereafter went with trader Francis Heron to the Bow and Red Deer rivers. In 1824, Capt. Samuel Black went on an expedition to the Finlay River, which was joined by Donald Manson.

Manson built his reputation within the company and was raised to the rank of clerk in the Columbia District. His superior was Chief Factor John McLoughlin, and he assisted him with Chief Factor James McMillan and Chief Factor John Work in improving Fort Vancouver, at the time the business headquarters of Oregon. McLoughlin would later become one of the founders of Oregon in the United States. In 1827, Manson helped build Fort Langley with McMillan and metis François Annance, where James Murray Yale, the future father-in-law of his son, would be the commander.

From 1829 to 1830, he was sent to Fort Astoria, the main trading post of John Jacob Astor before being taken by the Hudson's Bay Company. He went on a mission to rescue sunk ships in the same year. In 1831, he was placed in charge of Fort Simpson, and thereafter, built Fort McLoughlin. In 1832, Manson goes on an exploratory trip from the Nass to the Skeena, visiting Indian chiefs on his itinerary.

Manson would also work at Fort Alexandria with explorer Donald McLean. In 1833, with Mr. Anderson, Manson conceived a circulating library among the officers of the Hudson's Bay Company, being the first of its kind on the Pacific Slope. In 1837, Manson was promoted to the rank of chief trader within the organization, which gave him a share of the HBC's profits.

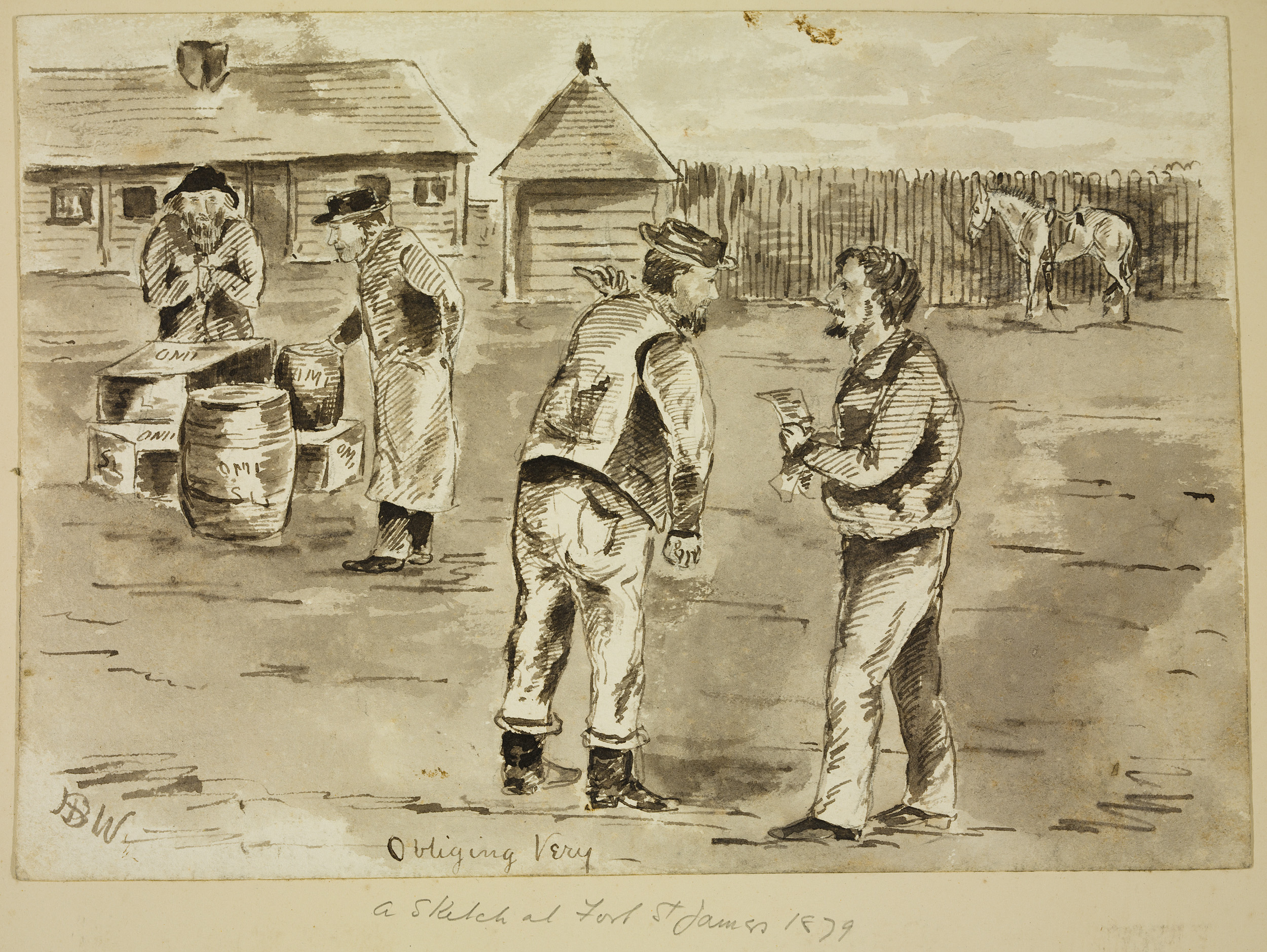
Fur trading at the post of Fort St. James

Manson stayed at Fort McLoughlin until 1839. He then went on a trip to Scotland, where he was born, and along the way, met with Gov. Sir George Simpson and the London shareholders of the HBC in October 1840. Manson came back from his trip and was placed in command of a post at Kamloops, and then in 1843, at Stikine in Alaskan territories. The territories were leased from Russia, obtained from a past deal negotiated by Gov. Simpson with Baron Ferdinand von Wrangel, Governor of Russian America. Manson worked at the Thompson River's post, which was flooded, and helped build a new post in the area around 1842.

He was given mission to find the murderers of John McLoughlin Jr., but could not find any evidence related to the event. Manson would stay at Fort St. James in British Columbia for the rest of his career, retiring around 1857. He bought land and a farm from Dr. Robert Newell at Champoeg, Oregon, where he would live with his family until his death.

Donald Manson was married in October 1828, to Félicité Lucier, daughter of fur trader Étienne Lucier, by whom he had 8 children. Lucier was one of the founders of Fort Astoria for the Astors. Donald Manson died on January 7, 1880, at Champoeg in Oregon. His son William Manson married the daughter of chief trader Donald McLean, and graduated from Edinburgh University in Scotland.

His daughter Anne Manson married Isaac Ogden, son of pioneer explorer Peter Skene Ogden. Isaac's uncle was Premier of Canada East, Charles Richard Ogden, the son-in-law of Gen. John Coffin, brother of Admiral Sir Isaac Coffin, 1st Baronet. Another son, fur trader John D. Manson, married to Aurelia Yale, daughter of chief trader James Murray Yale, member of the Yale family. His brothers-in-law included chief trader Capt. Henry Newsham Peers and chief trader George S. Simpson, son of the Governor of the Hudson's Bay Company, Sir George Simspon.
