= Kwantlen =

Kwantlen may refer to one of the following:

- Kwantlen people, an Indigenous Coast Salish people in British Columbia
- Kwantlen First Nation, the band government of the Kwantlen people
- Kwantlen Polytechnic University, formerly Kwantlen College, a public university located in the South Fraser region of British Columbia, Canada
- Kwantlen Student Association, the organization representing students at Kwantlen Polytechnic University
