= Fort Langley National Historic Site =

Former trading post of the Hudson's Bay Company in British Columbia, Canada

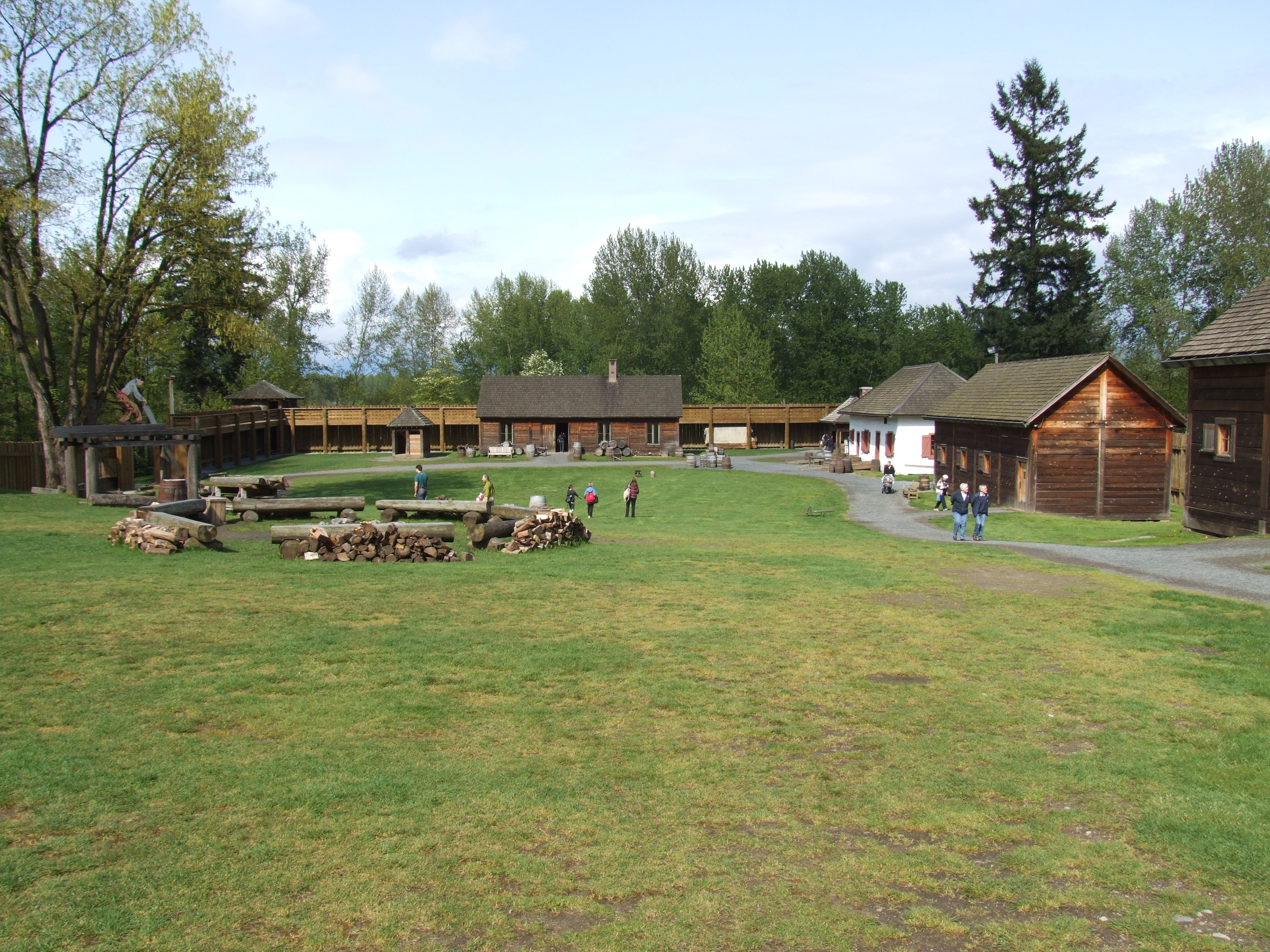
- Inside Fort Langley National Historic Site

- Location within British Columbia
- 49°10′05″N 122°34′10″W
- Location: 23433 Mavis Ave; Langley, British Columbia, Canada

History
- Founder: James McMillan; Donald Manson
- Built: 1827 (original); 1839/1840 (second site) (Note: A fire destroyed the fort built in 1839, necessitating its reconstruction in 1840.)
- Built for: Hudson's Bay Company
- Original use: Trading post
- Rebuilt: 1957–58 (Note: Most of the fort was rebuilt between 1957 and 1958. Several buildings were reconstructed later in the 1970s and 1990s. The fort's storehouse is the only building that dates back to the second fort, erected during the 1840s.)

Site notes
- Current use: Reconstructed living museum
- Governing body: Parks Canada
- Visitors: >74,000 (in 2023)
- Website: parks.canada.ca/lhn-nhs/bc/langley

National Historic Site of Canada
- Designated: 23 May 1923

Fort Langley National Historic Site, commonly shortened to Fort Langley, is a former fur trading post of the Hudson's Bay Company in the community of Fort Langley of Langley, British Columbia, Canada. The national historic site sits above the banks of the Bedford Channel across McMillan Island. The national historic site contains a visitor centre and a largely reconstructed trading post that contains ten structures surrounded by wooden palisades.

Fort Langley was initially established in 1827 in present-day Derby. The fort's operations were later relocated to present-day Langley with the new fort completed in 1839. However, the new fort would be rebuilt in the following year, after a fire ravaged the trading post. The fort continued to see use by the Hudson's Bay Company until 1886, when the company ceased to operate the site as a trading post.

By the 1920s, only one building remained at the site, the fort's storehouse. The site was later was designated as a National Historic Site of Canada in 1923. The historic site operated as a learning resource for the North American fur trade in the 19th century, with the fort's storehouse having been reopened as a museum in 1932. The fort's other structures and palisades were reconstructed by Parks Canada in the latter half of the 20th century.

== Background ==
Before Fort Langley was established, the area of the Fraser Valley has been home to the Sto:lo people for millennia. The Sto:lo people used the Fraser River as a major source of resources and enabled them to travel and interact with neighbouring Indigenous communities. The area of the Fraser Valley is described as being “one of the most economically productive regions of the Pacific Northwest” pre-contact. Within this area, the Sto:lo people developed highly complex social hierarchies, artistic traditions, and architecture. As the Royal Proclamation of 1763 affirmed the property rights of First Nations throughout British North America, the land belonged to the Sto:lo nation, and without signing nation to nation treaties between the British government and the Sto:lo, settler or company occupation of the land was illegal.

After John Jacob Astor's Pacific Fur Company sold its assets in the Oregon Country to the North West Company following the War of 1812, Astor's Fort Astoria was renamed Fort George and became the main depot for Pacific interior trade. Pelts collected in the northern New Caledonia district travelled south along the Fraser River to Fort Alexandria, then overland via a route known as the Brigade Trail to Fort Okanagan then along the Columbia River to Fort George on the coast. The Oregon Country/Columbia District was shared between the British and Americans as a result of the Treaty of 1818, but the treaty was to expire in 1827 and since Fort George stood on the south side of the Columbia River, it would likely be awarded to the United States in any boundary agreement.

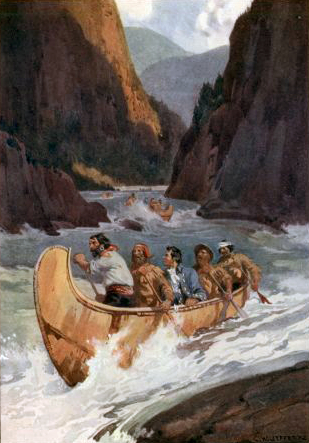
Depiction of Voyageurs along the Fraser River in 1808 by Charles William Jefferys. Fort Langley was built partly due to the belief that the Fraser River was a more navigable than the Columbia River.

After the North West Company merged with the Hudson's Bay Company in 1821, the HBC administrator George Simpson suggested the creation of Fort Vancouver on the northern bank of the Columbia, but that it serve as secondary post to a larger trade hub further north near the mouth of the Fraser River. Simpson felt such a location would help secure the coast from ocean-based American competition, and believed the Fraser to be more navigable than the Columbia River. He sent Chief Trader James McMillan to explore the region, and McMillan proposed an area near the Salmon River suitable to agriculture, and where fish were plentiful.

== History ==
=== First location ===
James McMillan returned to the Fraser River with 24 men, including four Iroquois, two Native Hawaiian Kanaka, and one Métis worker, in 1827 to begin the construction of Fort Langley (named for Thomas Langley, a prominent HBC director) 50 kilometres (31 mi) from the mouth of the Fraser River. The construction of this fort represented the first permanent contact of European settlers with Indigenous peoples on the Fraser River. This site was not the same as today's fort, but 4 km to the northwest at what was known by local Indigenous people as snaqʷaməx, and later called Old Fort Langley and finally renamed Derby in 1858 (now only farmland). But when they arrived at the end of July, five of the men were incapacitated with gonorrhea, another with "venereal disease", and all the horses were either dead, crippled, or exhausted. Despite these setbacks and the heavy brambles at the site, the remaining 19 men began to clear the land in preparation for the fort. The men at the fort were entirely at the mercy of the Sto:lo people, as they lacked the skills and knowledge to survive off of the land. To ensure lasting economic relationships with the Sto:lo, the men at the fort were encouraged to take Sto:lo women as their wives. The economic and social patterns adopted by the settlers post-contact illustrates their dependency on the Sto:lo (the original inhabitants of the land). Potatoes were planted in a garden during the establishment of Fort Langley. The first bastion was built by mid-August in order to defend against another attack by the Sto:lo, a second at the end of the month, and the palisade walls were completed in early September. Some of the Hudson's Bay men were nervous about the Indigenous people of the Fraser, and the bastions were completed first "to command respect in the eyes of the Indians, who begin, shrewdly, to conjecture for what purpose the Ports and loopholes are intended." After the stockade was complete only Indigenous people with furs were allowed past the gate. A number of buildings were built through autumn, and Fort Langley was officially completed on November 26. Native laborers resided in a camp a short distance from the station.

During the first few years, trade in furs with the Stó:lō, the Indigenous people (Fraser River), was surprisingly poor from the HBC point of view. Firstly, traders from Boston controlled most of the Maritime Fur Trade, travelling along the coast by boat. Such strong competition kept the price of pelts very high, much higher than Hudson's Bay was paying elsewhere. McMillan was advised by his superiors to intentionally undersell Americans in order to force them out of the region and assure a monopoly for the HBC. This came in the form of a trade tariff on that Indigenous people that they identified as a trading disadvantage where five beaver skins were required to receive one two-and-a-half point HBC blanket. Second, Indigenous people living along the river were not particularly interested in hunting or trapping, since they lived primarily on salmon. The Stó:lō initiated trade of salmon with the HBC, which would later become an important export of the Fort. As they had little contact with Europeans, they were quite self-sufficient and not in serious need of European goods. In the first year, guns were in high demand by the Stó:lō to fend off attacks from the Laich-kwil-tach, but when this threat died down, firearms became mainly symbolic yet infrequent items of trade. 1829 and 1831 were the most successful years for the fort's fur trading operations, each year netting 2,500 skins. Salmon pickling was begun by staff of the fort, creating nearly 300 barrels in 1831.

Also a disappointment to the HBC was Simpson's discovery that the Fraser was not as navigable as he had imagined. Along with Archibald McDonald (who would later replace McMillan at Fort Langley), Simpson travelled from York Factory to Fort St. James, the centre of trade for New Caledonia, before assembling a group of men (including James Murray Yale, who would later replace McMillan) to descend the Fraser towards Fort Langley. Their party found that travel down the Fraser was relatively easy until it forked with the Thompson River, after which the powerful rapids and sheer cliffs convinced Simpson the passage would be "certain Death, in nine attempts out of Ten." At least some part of the journey from the north would have to be made overland to bypass the Fraser Canyon and Hell's Gate.

=== Second location ===
As part of its plan to rid itself of American competition, the HBC sought to corner the market in Alaska by securing a monopoly on trade with the Russian American Company in 1839. McMillan went to many lengths to ensure that the Indigenous people were kept at a distance during the construction of the second fort. The location of the fort was moved four kilometres upstream in 1839 and changed its focus to farming, fish, and cranberry harvesting, rather than the fur trade. Although the fort was completed in 1839, a fire destroyed much of the fort in 1840 necessitating its reconstruction once again.

Trading was now only allowed through a wicket, with sentries posted on the second story. In 1840 the farm had "potatoes abundant" along with 750 bushels of wheat, 500 bushels of oats and 600 bushels of peas. Catholic Missionary Modeste Demers traveled to Fort Langley and performed religious services for the staff and neighboring Indigenous, baptising over 700 children in 1841. Despite baptizing many, white men would still administer beatings to Indigenous people who did not behave in a colonially respectful manner.

Due to its strategic location on the northern boundary of the Oregon Territory of the U.S. and in the path of the Fraser Canyon Gold Rush, Fort Langley grew dramatically. It played a key role in the establishment of the 49th parallel as the international boundary with the U.S. and was the staging point for prospectors heading up the Fraser Canyon in search of their fortune. The gold rush represented a turning point for many of the Indigenous peoples of the Fraser Valley who experienced a loss of their trading relationship with the HBC and encroachment onto their land by settlers. Non-native settlement on the Fraser river compromised Indigenous access to their traditional fishing sites and land, leading to a disruption in the regularity of their traditional practices. Moreover, legal restrictions on the trade of Indigenous catch made it difficult for the Stó:lo to trade fish to make a living.

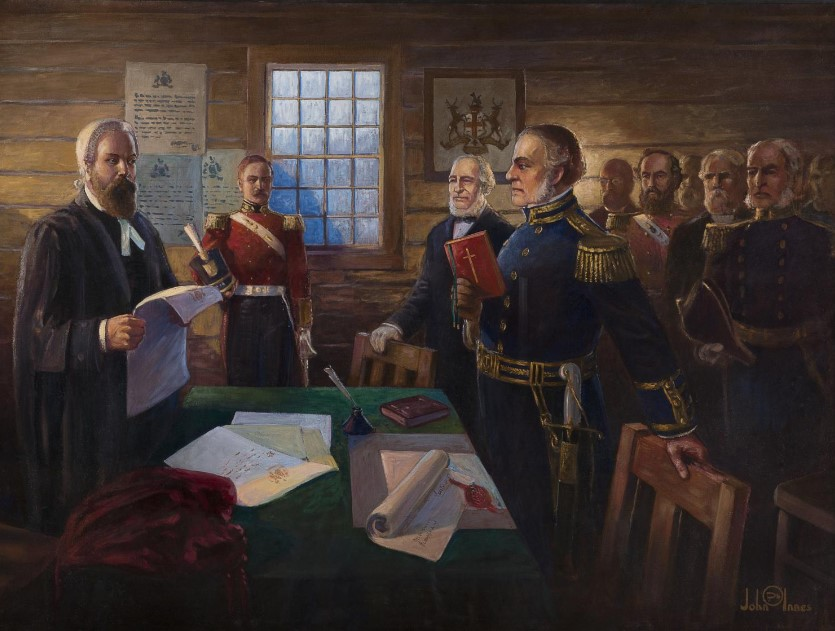
Governor James Douglas taking the oath of office at Fort Langley in 1858

The social and political consequences of this influx of adventurers led the British Parliament to establish a crown colony on the Pacific Mainland. While some might have projected Fort Langley as the capital of the newly created colony, Colonial military commander, Colonel Moody of the Royal Engineers, Columbia Detachment, deemed it militarily indefensible and ordered the construction of New Westminster on the high north bank of the Fraser River many miles downstream due to its much more defensible position. On 19 November 1858, the proclamation that established the Colony of British Columbia was read out by James Douglas, who was named the colony's first governor. Douglas made the proclamation on his journey upriver to confront American miners in the wake of the Fraser Canyon War as a pre-emptive move to forestall any drives for annexation to the US.

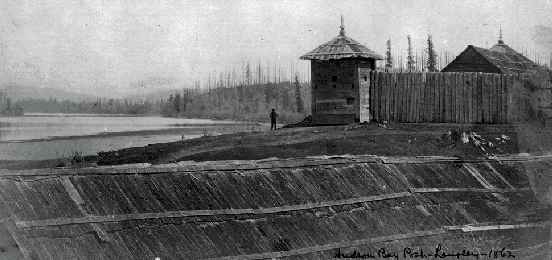
Photograph of Fort Langley from 1862

The decline of the fort over the next 30 years was attributed to three factors. First, the advent of paddle wheelers on the Fraser meant that river traffic was extended to Fort Hope and Fort Yale. Second, the capital of the colony was established at New Westminster, British Columbia and later moved to Victoria. Finally, competition for goods and services undercut the monopoly the Hudson's Bay Company had formerly enjoyed. In 1886, Fort Langley ceased to be a company post.

==== Conversion to a National Historic Site ====
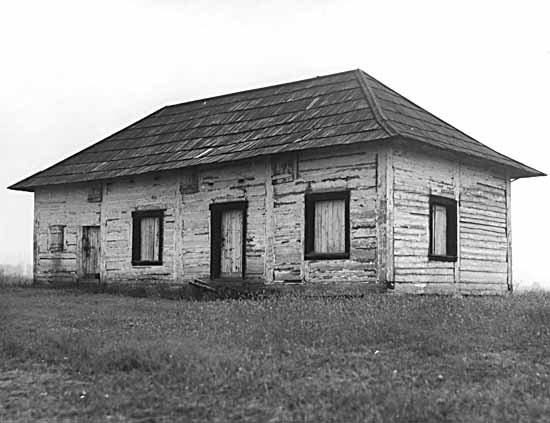
The fort's storehouse in 1931. By this time, the storehouse was the only remaining structure standing on the site

In 1924, the Canadian government designated Fort Langley as a National Historic Site and erected a commemorative plaque near the storehouse. At this time, the site consisted only of the one building and 0.40 hectares (1 acre) of land. From 1931 to 1956, the Native Sons and Daughters of British Columbia operated a museum out of the storehouse. Parks Canada took control of the site in 1955, and a joint Federal-Provincial program reconstructed three buildings in time for the centennial of the founding of British Columbia in 1958. In 1978, the site became a national historic park, and has consisted of 8.5 hectares (21 acres) since 1985.

In 2019, the students of Langley Fine Arts School worked alongside the community members of the Kwantlen Nation as a part of the project This is Kwantlen, to increase Indigenous representation in Fort Langley. Photographs and biographies of Kwantlen First Nation members were displayed outside of the Fort Langley National Historic Site and throughout Fort Langley during April and May 2019.

== Grounds ==
The national historic site is situated where the second Fort Langley was built in 1839, above the banks of the Bedford Channel across from McMillan Island. The grounds of the historic site is approximate 8.4 hectares (21 acres). The national historic site initially comprised 0.4 hectares (0.99 acres) when it was acquired by the federal government in 1924; although the property grew in size in subsequent decades, including two major expansions. The site was first expanded during the 1950s with the reconstruction of several buildings, in conjunction with British Columbia's centennial; and again during the 1990s.

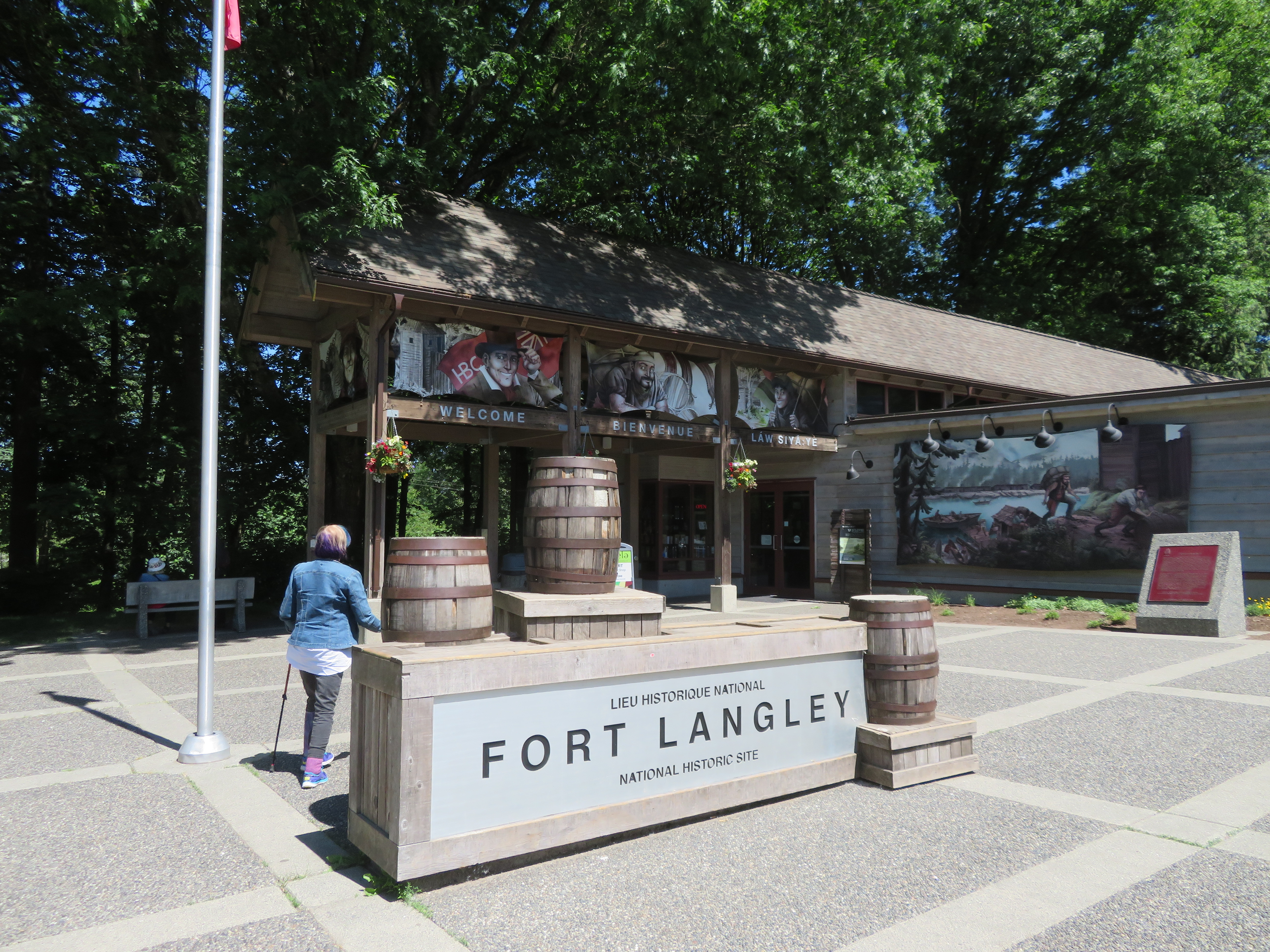
Entrance to the national historic site. The site's visitor centre is visible in the background.

Ten structures are situated inside the palisades of the fort, although the only structure that dates back to the 19th century is the fort's storehouse. The other nine buildings in the fort are reconstructions of the fort's original structures, built during the 20th century. However, the grounds of the historic site does contain the archeological remains and remnants of structures dating to the 19th century fort. Most buildings are used to provide interpretive services for visitors, although two buildings within the fort are also used for maintenance and artifact storage.

In addition to structures built inside the fort, the site also contains a visitor centre, built in 1997 outside the palisades of the fort.

=== Bastion and palisades ===
The fort is bounded by timber palisades. The location of the fort's original palisades were identified through archaeological investigation in the years after the fort was designated a national historic site in 1923. A two-storey bastion built out of logs and topped with a pyramid-shaped roof is built along the northeast palisades walls. The northeast bastion is a small irregularly shaped square windows and two doors are situated on its second level, providing access to the wall's galleries. The northeast bastion was rebuilt in 1957. As a reconstruction, the bastion's designation as a Federal Heritage Building is confined to the building's footprint.

=== Buildings ===
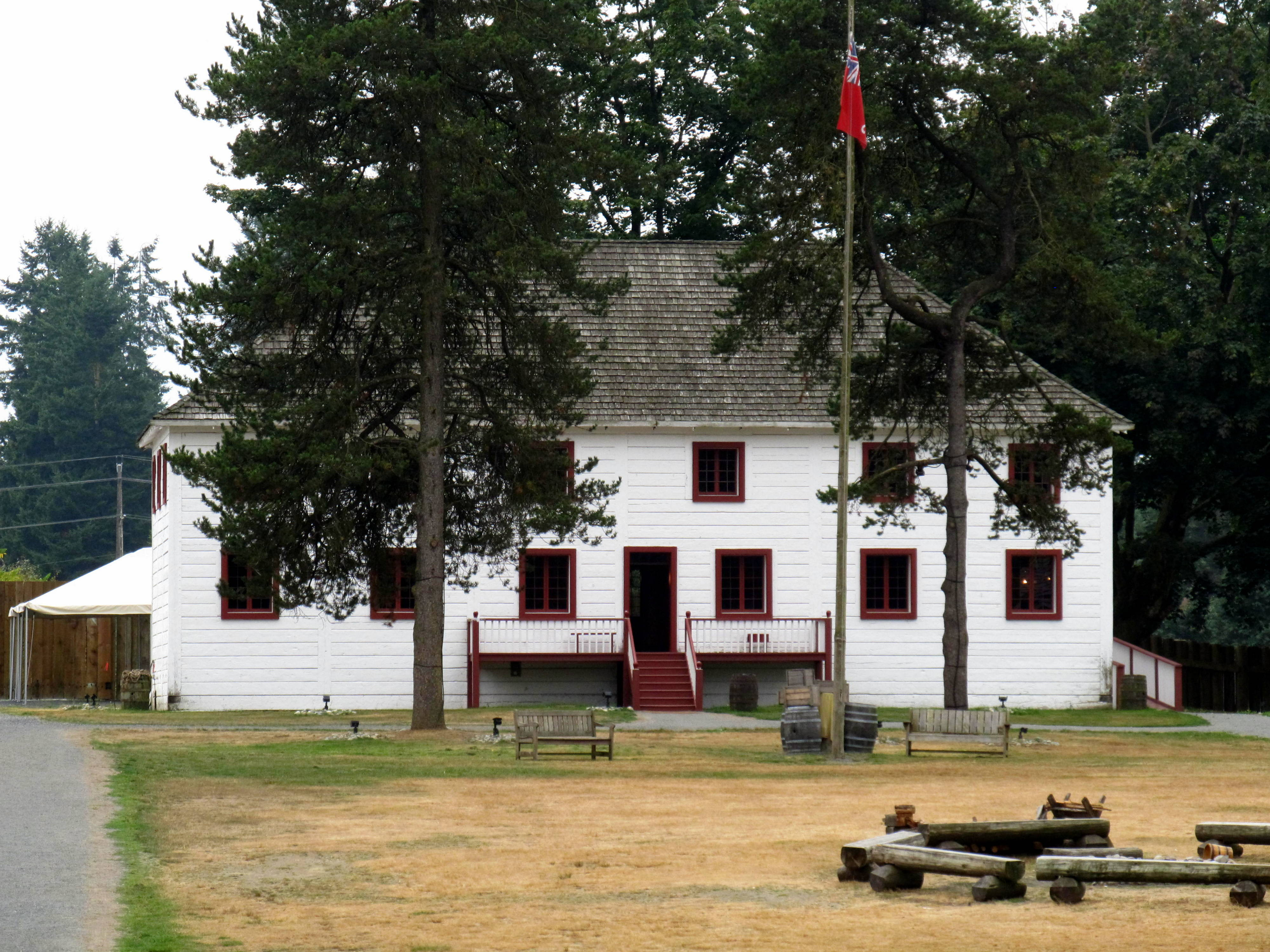
The Big House is the largest structure inside the fort

The fort's storehouse is a rectangular one and a half storey building with a hipped roof. The storehouse is the only remaining structure that dates back to the original fur trading fort. It was rebuilt in the 1840s after a fire which destroyed a similar building in 1839, and was the only building which survived the demise of the Fort as an active trading post. The Mavis family, who later purchased the land, used it as a barn for a number of years, until Fort Langley was recognized as a site of historic significance in 1923.

Many of the other buildings at the fort are reconstructions. The Big House is a reconstructed two-storey log-structure erected in 1958, and is the largest building enclosed within the palisades of the fort. The exterior of the log-hewn structure is whitewashed. The Big House is a reconstruction of the living quarters of James Murray Yale and his wife; and William Henry Newton and his wife, Emmaline (Tod) Newton

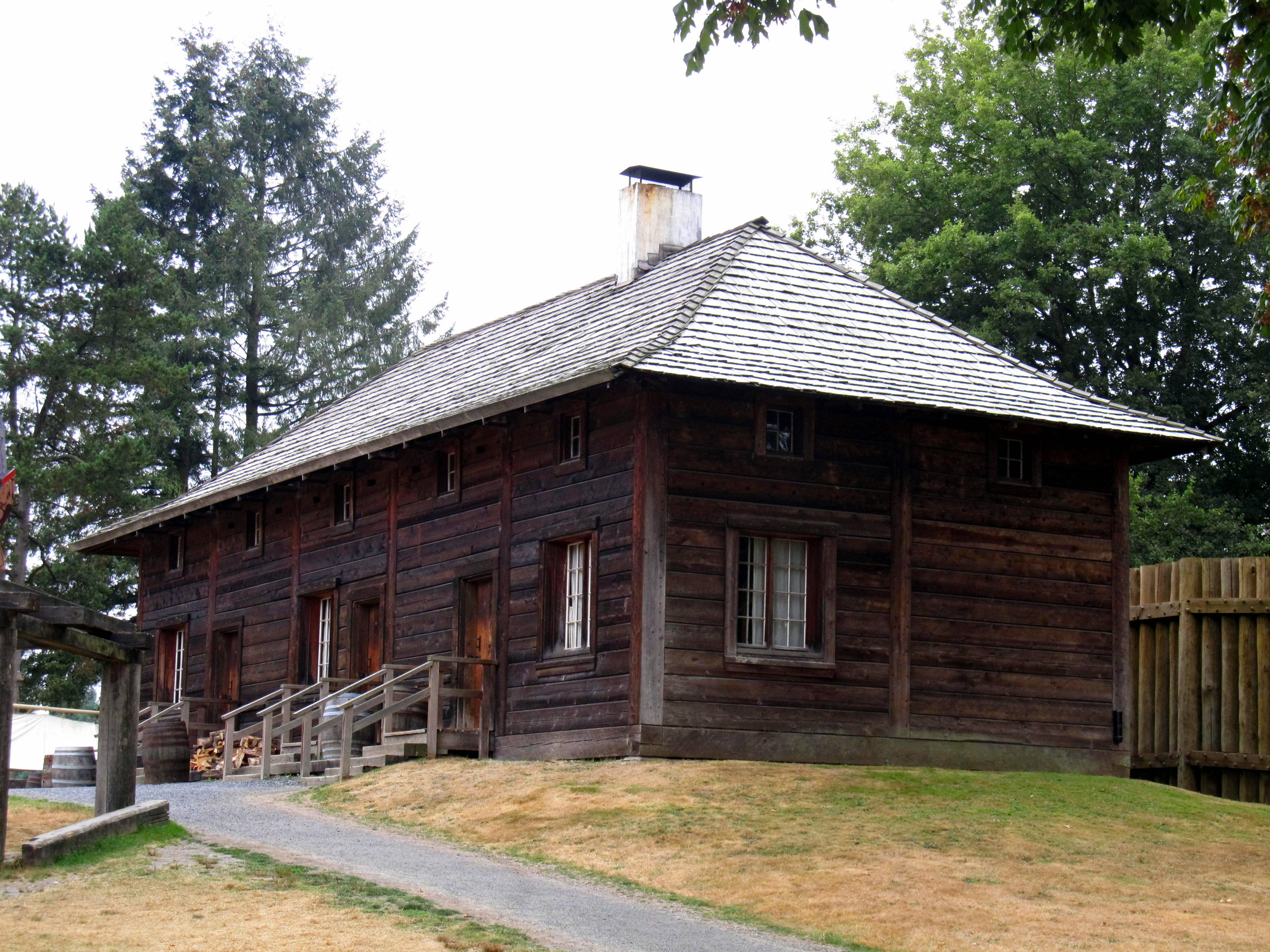
The servants' quarters is one of several reconstructions built during the 1950s.

The servants' quarters is a one-and-a-half storey rectangular timber structure with a whitewashed exterior, and is covered with a hipped roof; also reconstructed in 1958. The servant's quarters portrays the living conditions of three different HBC employees. The building was used to display barrel-making until 1992, when the display was moved to the newly built cooperage. The servants' quarters and the Big House were both erected using the Red River frame construction method. The Big House and servants' quarters designation as a Federal Heritage Building is confined to the building's footprint.

The blacksmith shop was first built in 1973, and then rebuilt in 1975. It features a working forge and live demonstrations of blacksmithing. The cooperage was built in 1992, slightly south of the original, and features all the required tools for barrel making and other woodworking. The Depot was reconstructed in 1997 and is mainly used as an exhibition area and administration building. The original building would have been used as a supply depot for shipments in and out of the Fort.

== See also ==
- List of forts
- List of fur trading post and forts in North America
- List of museums in British Columbia
