= Salmon River (Langley) =

River in Canada

Coordinates: 49°10′37″N 122°35′11″W

Map

The Salmon River (Halkomelem: sc̓e:ɬxʷəy̓əm) is a small river in Abbotsford and the Township of Langley in the Lower Mainland region of British Columbia, Canada, flowing northwest then northeast to enter Bedford Channel, which separates McMillan Island from Fort Langley, which is just southwest.

The river is one of the only fish stock sustaining streams remaining in the Metro Vancouver area.

== History ==
The Salmon River was an important route for First Nations peoples, for the Hudson's Bay Company early settlers and later ones once the colonial government was established. It was used for trade and transportation, connecting the Fort Langley settlers and indigenous peoples with Mud Bay and the Strait of Georgia via a portage to the Nicomekl River. The river and its watershed provided salmon for use in trade and fostered the establishment of a prosperous community in the vicinity of its junction with the Fraser River.

Reporter and historian Bruce Alistair McKelvie once coined the name T'saikwakyan to identify the river as well as the portage leading to it.

== See also ==
- Salmon River (disambiguation)
