= TinyKittens Society =

Canadian animal welfare charity

- Formation: August 2013; 13 years ago
- Founder: Shelly Roche
- Type: Charity
- Legal status: Active
- Purpose: Protecting feral cats
- Location: Fort Langley, British Columbia, Canada
- Members: Tinykittens VIP
- Website: tinykittens.com

TinyKittens Society is a Canadian charity in Fort Langley, British Columbia, Canada, supporting feral cats. The organisation was established as a non-profit in 2015 by Shelly Roche.

The society's volunteers trap, neuter and return (TNR) cats from the large colonies of feral cats in the area. Where possible, kittens and older cats are made available for adoption.

TinyKittens runs a livestream showing 24-hour footage of the kittens and cats being cared for by the society. There is an associated chat space. The group received news coverage for rescuing Cassidy, a disabled cat found as a feral kitten without his back legs, and Mason, an older feral cat with kidney disease who enjoyed the company of kittens.

In 2017 the charity supported kittens rescued from wildfires in Quesnel, and in 2021 rescued feral cats and lost pet cats during floods in the Fraser Valley.

In 2020, Roche said TinyKittens supports one to two hundred cats and kittens a year. In 2020, she said that the group spays and neuters about 200 cats a year. She noted that the charity does not have enough resources.

Social media is important to the charity. In 2019, the YouTube channel run by the organisation had 135,000 subscribers. In 2020, the number of views of the channel averaged three million a month. There were sixty volunteers working as moderators.
