= Bedford Channel =

Coordinates: 49°10′00″N 122°35′00″W

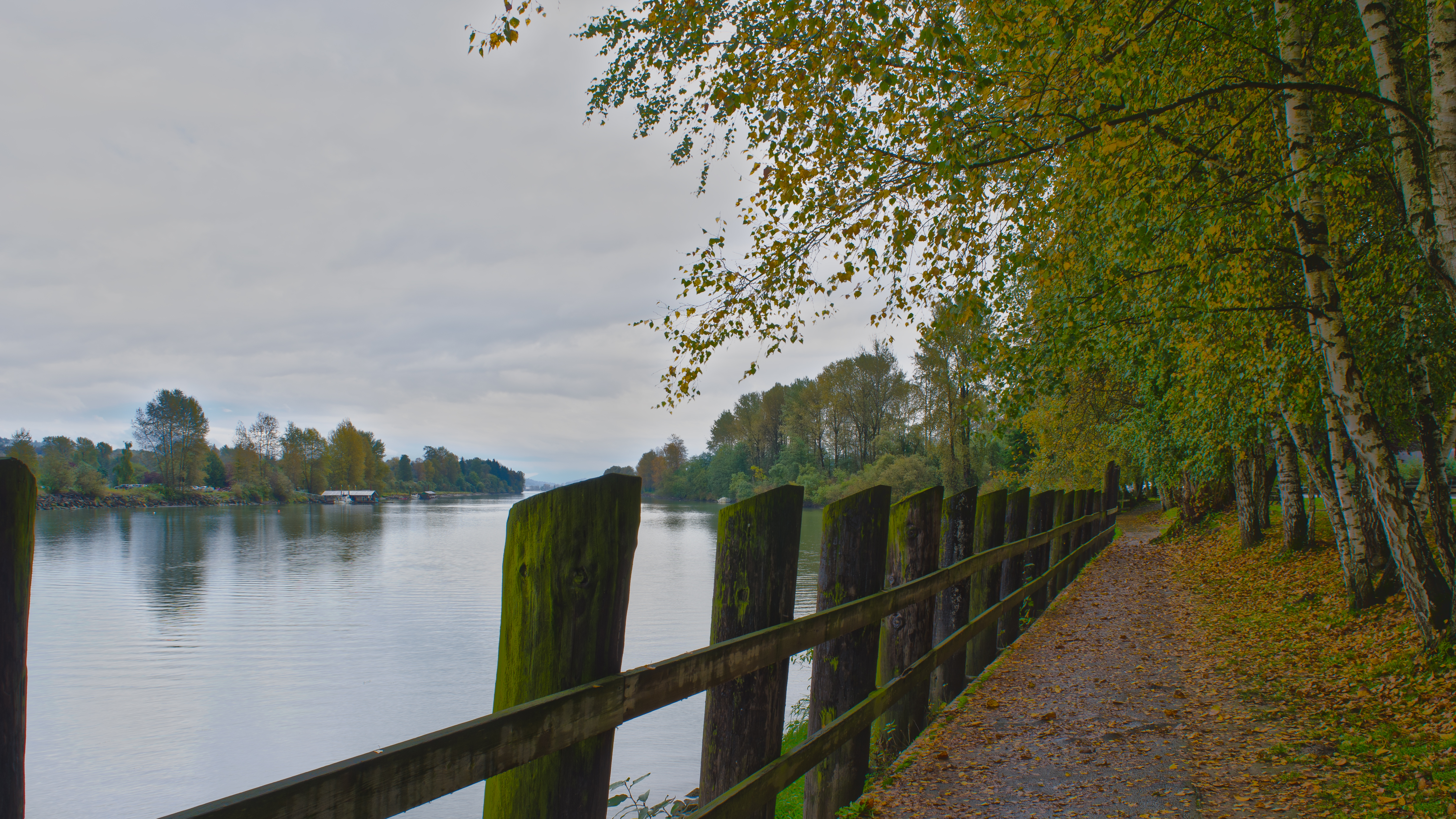
Bedford Channel

The Bedford Channel is a small side channel of the Fraser River near the north end of the Township of Langley, on the south side of McMillan Island. The pair of islands—Brae Island and McMillan Island that protect the riverfront of Fort Langley, British Columbia are reached by the bridge that crosses the Bedford Channel on the way to the now-closed Albion Ferry terminal and the main reserve community of the Kwantlen First Nation on McMillan Island. The Bedford name has been used in the name of a new housing development in the town of Fort Langley.
