= Derby, British Columbia =

Derby
- Location of Derby in British Columbia
- Coordinates: 49°12′0″N 122°38′0″W
- Country: Canada
- Province: British Columbia

Derby is a locality on the lower Fraser River in northwestern Langley. The site of the original Fort Langley, established in 1827 by the Hudson's Bay Company, and was the first post established in Coast Salish territory. The Fort was later moved 4 km to its present location in 1839. In 1858, when the Royal Engineers arrived, they built barracks in Derby. All signs of the town and fort have since disappeared, with the locality now only an intersection in the middle of farmland. Its church, the Church of St. John the Divine, was moved across the river to what is now Maple Ridge, where it remains today. The only surviving trace of Derby on the map is the Derby Reach of the Fraser, which describes the northward arc of the Fraser south of Haney (Maple Ridge's downtown) and the associated Derby Reach Regional Park.

== Name origin ==
The name is believed to be derived from that of the British Prime Minister in 1858, Edward Geoffrey Smith-Stanley, 14th Earl of Derby (1799–1869).

== See also ==
- List of ghost towns in British Columbia
