= Bruce Alistair McKelvie =

B. A. McKelvie
- Born: November 19, 1889; Vancouver, British Columbia, Canada
- Died: April 17, 1960 (aged 70); Victoria, British Columbia, Canada
- Occupations: Journalist, writer
- Spouse: Lillian Kate Allen (m. 1919)
- Writing career
- Period: 20th century
- Genre: History

Bruce Alastair McKelvie (November 19, 1889 – April 17, 1960) was a Canadian journalist and historian. He signed his books as B.A. McKelvie.

== Biography ==
McKelvie was born in British Columbia to Scottish born parents who had previously lived in Quebec. His father worked as a machinist. McKelvie started work as an printer's apprentice at a newspaper. He worked at a variety of jobs in the business before he became a police reporter for the Vancouver Daily Province in 1913. He was on board the tugboat Sea Lion during the Komagata Maru incident in 1914. He also worked for the Vancouver Sun and the Victoria Colonist. He wrote several books that popularized British Columbia history.

== Works ==
- Early history of the province of British Columbia, (1926)
- Huldowget: A Story of The North Pacific Coast, (1926)
- The Black Canyon: A Story of '58, (1927)
- Pelts And Powder: A Story of The West Coast in the Making, (1929)
- Vancouver Island's urgent need for a new deal, (1931)
- Legends Of Stanley Park, (1941)
- Victoria, B.C. 1843-1943, (1943)
- Fort Langley, outpost of Empire, (1946)
- Maquinna the magnificent, (1946)
- Tales of conflict:Indian-White murders and massacres in pioneer British Columbia (1950)
- Challenge from the north, (1952)
- Pageant of B.C.: glimpses into the romantic development of Canada's far western province, (1957)
- HBC in BC, (1958)

=== Posthumous ===
- Magic, Murder and Mystery, (1966)
