= McMillan Island =

Island in British Columbia, Canada

Native name: Sqwàlets
- Interactive map of McMillan Island

Geography
- Location: Lower Fraser River, Lower Mainland, British Columbia
- Coordinates: 49°11′N 122°34′W
- Area: 1.78 km^{2} (0.69 sq mi)

Administration
- Canada
- Province: British Columbia
- Largest settlement: McMillan Island Indian Reserve No. 6 (pop. 63)

Demographics
- Population: 63 (2006)
- Pop. density: 38/km^{2} (98/sq mi)
- Ethnic groups: Kwantlen

McMillan Island is an island in the Fraser River, British Columbia, Canada, also known as McMillan Slough.

== Geography ==
=== Overview ===
McMillan Island is located in the lower Fraser River, north of Fort Langley and south of Maple Ridge, and separated from the former by Bedford Channel. It has a total land area of 1.78 square kilometres.

=== Geology ===
It is composed primarily of settled silt and debris from the Fraser River and shaped by the erosive power of the river. Geologically it was (10000 years ago) a peninsula on the shore of what is now Maple Ridge. Erosion wore down the peninsula until it became an island, although one much larger than the current McMillan Island. Once there was a channel worn between this large island and the mainland, the water flow slowed and silt and debris settled on the south side of the island, eventually connecting it to what is now Fort Langley. The water eventually broke a small section of the original island off, resulting in the current McMillan Island.

McMillan Island was, as late as the 1920s, two islands separated by a very narrow channel. The north-western island was called Brae Island, while the south-eastern was McMillan. Following the construction of Jacob Haldi Bridge across the larger Bedford channel, the upstream portion of the narrow separating channel slowly became filled by this sediment, thus combining the two islands.

=== Human geography ===
There is a bridge across the Bedford Channel to the island along Glover Road, the main road through both Fort Langley and McMillan Island. There are several docks on the island, including the docks from the former Albion Ferry.

About 68 hectares (170 acres) of McMillan Island that was previously Brae Island was acquired by the Greater Vancouver Regional District in 1995 and much of it was designated Brae Island Regional Park. Some of this land has been leased for the creation a private campground. The remaining 1.5 hectares (3.7 acres) of former Brae Island is owned by the Township of Langley.

The area that was McMillan Island prior to its joining with Brae Island is the reserve land of Kwantlen First Nation. This reserve, "McMillan Island 6", is 191 hectares (470 acres) in size and the largest and most populated of the First Nation's seven reserves. In 2016, the reserve was home to approximately 94 people, and there are 22 private dwellings and the Kwantlen Nation's Band Office.

== History ==
=== Kwantlen territory ===
The island is a part of the Kwantlen First Nation's traditional territory. This reserve is the location of their main village which relocated here once Fort Langley was built, partly to dominate trade with the fort and also for protection from attack under the shelter of the fort's guns. Their former main village was at Qayqyat, or Kikait, opposite New Westminster on the Fraser's southeast bank there, at a location also known as Brownsville in today's Bridgeview neighbourhood of the City of Surrey.

Their territory overlaps with that of the Kwikwetlem, Tsawwassen and Katzie nations, and extends up the Fraser as far as the Stave River; beyond that is the territory of the Matsqui nation. Most of the band's reserves are on the north bank of the Fraser.

The island was named after James McMillan of the HBC who founded Fort Langley. He visited the area in 1824 and again in 1827.

=== Albion Ferry ===
A dock on the north side of the island was formerly the southern-bank terminus of the Albion Ferry. However, with the opening of the Golden Ears Bridge, ferry service has ceased.
