= Albion Ferry =

Former ferry service in British Columbia, Canada

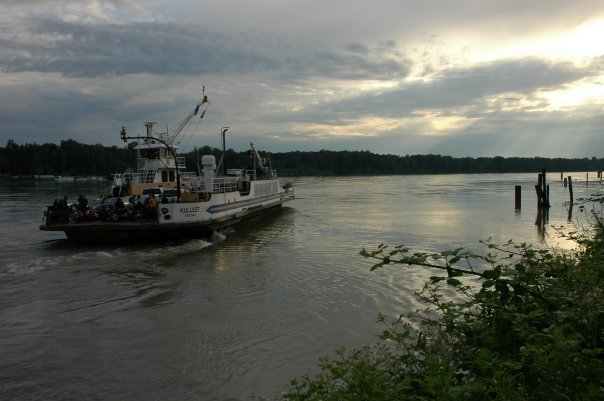
- Locale: Metro Vancouver, British Columbia
- Waterway: Fraser River
- Transit type: Passenger and vehicle ferry
- Owner: TransLink
- Operator: Fraser River Marine Transportation Ltd.
- Began operation: June 2, 1957; 69 years ago
- Ended operation: July 31, 2009; 17 years ago
- No. of lines: 1
- No. of vessels: 2
- No. of terminals: 2

The Albion Ferry was a passenger and vehicle ferry service that sailed on the Fraser River between Albion and Fort Langley in the Lower Fraser Valley region of British Columbia, Canada from June 2, 1957, until July 31, 2009.

Originally operated by the Ministry of Highways as part of their inland ferry services, a single vessel – MV T'Lagunna – provided service every hour from 1:00 am to 6:00 am and every 30 minutes during the rest of the day. It ran continuously when there were overloads.. Named for the Halqemeylem name for the Golden Ears, it had originally served the communities of Agassiz and Rosedale as MV Agassiz. Built in 1931, it had a vehicle capacity of just 16 cars. Tolls of 40 cents per car and driver, and 10 cents per additional passenger, were initially charged but these were removed on February 15, 1972, and the service remained free thereafter. In 1978, after many years of complaints about safety and reliability another ferry – MV Kulleet – was put into service alongside T'Lagunna. In 1985, Kulleet's sister ship, MV Klatawa replaced T'Lagunna, which was kept as a spare until 1986. Both Kulleet and Klatawa had previously been servicing short routes in the Gulf Islands. T'Lagunna was sold for use as a cargo barge, and eventually sank in Howe Sound; it was salvaged in 2011.

In 1998, the Greater Vancouver Transportation Authority (operating as TransLink) was created to handle all transportation in greater Vancouver, including the Albion ferry. A subsidiary company, Fraser River Marine Transportation Ltd., was created to operate the ferry. At a 50th anniversary celebration in June 2007, a commemorative plaque was placed by Maple Ridge's Community Heritage Commission at the Albion ferry terminal. The ferry service was retired shortly after the Golden Ears Bridge opened to traffic on June 16, 2009. The last sailings for Kulleet and Klatawa took place on July 31, 2009, just after noon. At the end of its life the ferry employed 58 full-time and as many as 20 auxiliary employees; 2006 traffic amounted to 1.5 million vehicles and 4.0 million passengers. The two ferries were sold in 2011 for $400,000 to a local marine transportation company.

== See also ==
- Barnston Island Ferry
- List of crossings of the Fraser River
- SeaBus
- British Columbia K-class ferry
