= Kwantlen First Nation =

Indigenous reserve in British Columbia, Canada

Coordinates: 49°10′06.78″N 122°34′47.15″W

- Band No. 564
- q̓ʷa꞉n̓ƛ̓ən̓, Qwʼó꞉ltlʼel
- Location of Kwantlen in Metro Vancouver
- People: Stó:lō
- Headquarters: Fort Langley
- Province: British Columbia

Land
- Main reserve: McMillan Island 6
- Reserves: List: Langley 2; Langley 3; Langley 4; Langley 5; Whonnock 1; Pekw'Xe:yles
- Land area: 5.7 km^{2} (2.2 sq mi)

Population (2025)
- On reserve: 68
- On other land: 35
- Off reserve: 311
- Total population: 414

Website
- www.kwantlenfn.ca; www.kwantlen.community

Kwantlen First Nation (Halkomelem: q̓ʷa꞉n̓ƛ̓ən̓ or Qwʼó꞉ltlʼel) is a First Nations band government in British Columbia, Canada, located primarily on McMillan Island near Fort Langley. The Kwantlen people traditionally speak hən̓q̓əmin̓əm̓, the Downriver dialect of Halkomelem, one of the Salishan family languages.

The Kwantlen are a Stó꞉lō people (an ethnicity which includes the nearby Katzie and Kwikwetlem First Nations among many others throughout British Columbia's Lower Mainland region), though as of June 2018, Kwantlen withdrew from the Stó꞉lō Tribal Council and currently operates as an independent Nation.

== History ==
The events and shape of Kwantlen history and culture before and after European contact is inseparable from that of the Sto:lo people as a whole. Prior to European contact, the Kwantlen were one of the most populous First Nations of the Lower Fraser and the leading faction of the Sto:lo people. Kwantlen occupied many significant village sites throughout their territory, including settlements in current day New Westminster, Surrey, Langley, Maple Ridge, and Mission. According to anthropologist Charles Hill-Tout, the main village of the Kwantlen people was sχəyəməɬ in what is now known as New Westminster. Directly across the River on the Surrey side was the summer fishing village known as qəqəyt. Another key area of Kwantlen territory is the Stave River valley that was and continues to be important for hunting, trapping, cedar bark stripping, fishing, and other cultural uses.

After European contact, the Kwantlen moved their main settlement upriver from New Westminster to Fort Langley. The Hudson's Bay Company had established the trading post in 1829. The Kwantlen defensively sought to control and maintain a trading advantage with the HBC in Fort Langley. The importance of the Kwantlen to the British settlement at Fort Langley became evident when Hudson's Bay Company men at the Fort joined Kwantlen warriors in repelling an attack by the Euclataws of Quadra Island - the victory of combined Kwantlen and British forces helped bring an end to slave raids on the lower Fraser by northern tribes, and is the only time British and Indigenous forces fought side by side in British Columbia. Kwantlen lost power after the formation of the Colony of British Columbia. Their power was diminished further after British Columbia joined Canada, and the colonizing government took control and assigned their affairs to the administration of an Indian Agent This agent was appointed by the government in Ottawa.

== Origin of the name ==
In early European records, the Kwantlen people are referred to as the Quoitlen, Quaitlines, and other variations on these spellings. In the late-1800s the Kwantlen First Nation became known to non-Natives as the "Langley Indian Band", a name which became official, and was used by the Department of Indian Affairs until 1994. In June 1994, Chief Marilyn Gabriel reclaimed the traditional name of Kwantlen for her people and community which was marked by a traditional ceremony. Kwantlen Polytechnic University was granted permission to use the Kwantlen Name by the late Sto:lo Grand Chief Joe Gabriel. The name "Kwantlen" means "Tireless Runner" in the Halkomelem language.

== Modern day ==
The Kwantlen First Nation is a progressive community administered by the hereditary chief and council and advised by the decisions of a formal Elders Advisory Committee that meets once a month. With this guidance, the community has seen a cultural resurgence and robust economic growth. Some examples of this cultural resurgence include the opening of a new Cultural Centre, a renewed focus on learning Halkomelem, and the annual First Salmon Ceremony. Kwantlen is Operational under the First Nations Land Management Act which through the Kwantlen Land Code, enables Kwantlen to opt-out of 34 Sections of the Indian Act related to the management of reserve lands.

The band owns a number of business entities. These entities are:

- Seyem' Qwantlen Business Management Ltd
- Seyem' Qwantlen Construction Ltd.
- Seyem' Qwantlen Construction Limited Partnership
- Seyem' Qwantlen Development Ltd.
- Seyem' Qwantlen Development Limited Partnership
- Seyem' Qwantlen Resources Ltd.
- Seyem' Qwantlen Resources Limited Partnership
- Seyem' Qwantlen Ventures Limited Partnership
- Seyem' Qwantlen Ventures Ltd.
- Lelem Hospitality Limited Partnership
- Lelem Hospitality Ltd.
- Seyem' Qwantlen Harbour Authority
- Kwantlen Lands, Resources and Stewardship Ltd.
- Seyem' Qwantlen Housing Society

In addition to these business ventures, Seyem' Qwantlen is also involved in a number of heritage and stewardship activities which are designed to improve local fisheries, wildlife and habitat, and bring awareness to the wider non-Native community of the Kwantlen People and their rich culture.

== Territory ==
The band administers six Indian reserves:

- Langley Indian Reserve No. 2, on right (west) bank of the Stave River, 1 mile from its confluence with the Fraser River, 58.3 ha. This and IRs Nos. 3 and 4 are located in the District of Mission
- Langley Indian Reserve No. 3, on island at the mouth of the Stave River, 46 ha.
- Langley Indian Reserve No. 4, on the left (east) bank of the mouth of the Stave River, adjacent to Silvermere Lake, 96 ha.
- Langley Indian Reserve No. 5, on the right (north) bank of the Fraser River, 2 miles northeast of Fort Langley, to the east of Albion, 140.6 ha.
- Whonnock Indian Reserve No. 1, between Whonnock (W) and Ruskin (E), 34.4 ha.
- McMillan Island Indian Reserve No. 6, on McMillan Island at Fort Langley, 181 ha., which is the main community of the band and also the location of its offices.

The band also shares the Pekw'Xe:yles reserve with 20 other bands. It is the former St. Mary's Indian Residential School just east of Mission and is now a cultural, government, and aboriginal business centre.

Kwantlen First Nation traditional territory is located in Metropolitan Vancouver and includes land in: Langley, Maple Ridge, Pitt Meadows, Mission, Abbotsford, Surrey, New Westminster, Burnaby, Coquitlam, Richmond, Port Coquitlam, Delta, and Vancouver. The Nation has ceded no territory and does not engage in negotiations over territorial sovereignty.

== Governance Controversy ==
In February 2019, an investigative report in the Walrus Magazine written discussed the band's unusual form of hereditary government. Unlike most First Nations, the Kwantlen First Nation has no elections for any governing body, all positions of responsibility are appointed by hereditary chief Marilyn Gabriel. In response to the report, community members launched a petition asking for a new, written, governance code and elections. On March 15, 2019, the band administration published a letter, addressed to all band members agreeing to some of the committee's requests. On May 21, 2021, a third party mediator produced a consensus report calling for an elected council and a hereditary chief. However the band took no action on the report, leading band members to form a general assembly to fire the chief, and elect new councillors. In a February 2023 referendum, the new council received 100% support from voters to bring in a new governance code. Following the referendum, the hereditary chief launched a lawsuit against band members. The case was heard in January, 2024, with a decision due in February. During the course of the trial, the hereditary chief's legal representatives admitted that band members do in fact have the right to remove a chief by way of a general assembly or vote.

== Population ==
As of January 2025, the band's registered population is 414. 68 band members live on reserve, the majority on the main reserve on McMillan Island.
