= Fort Langley =

- Community
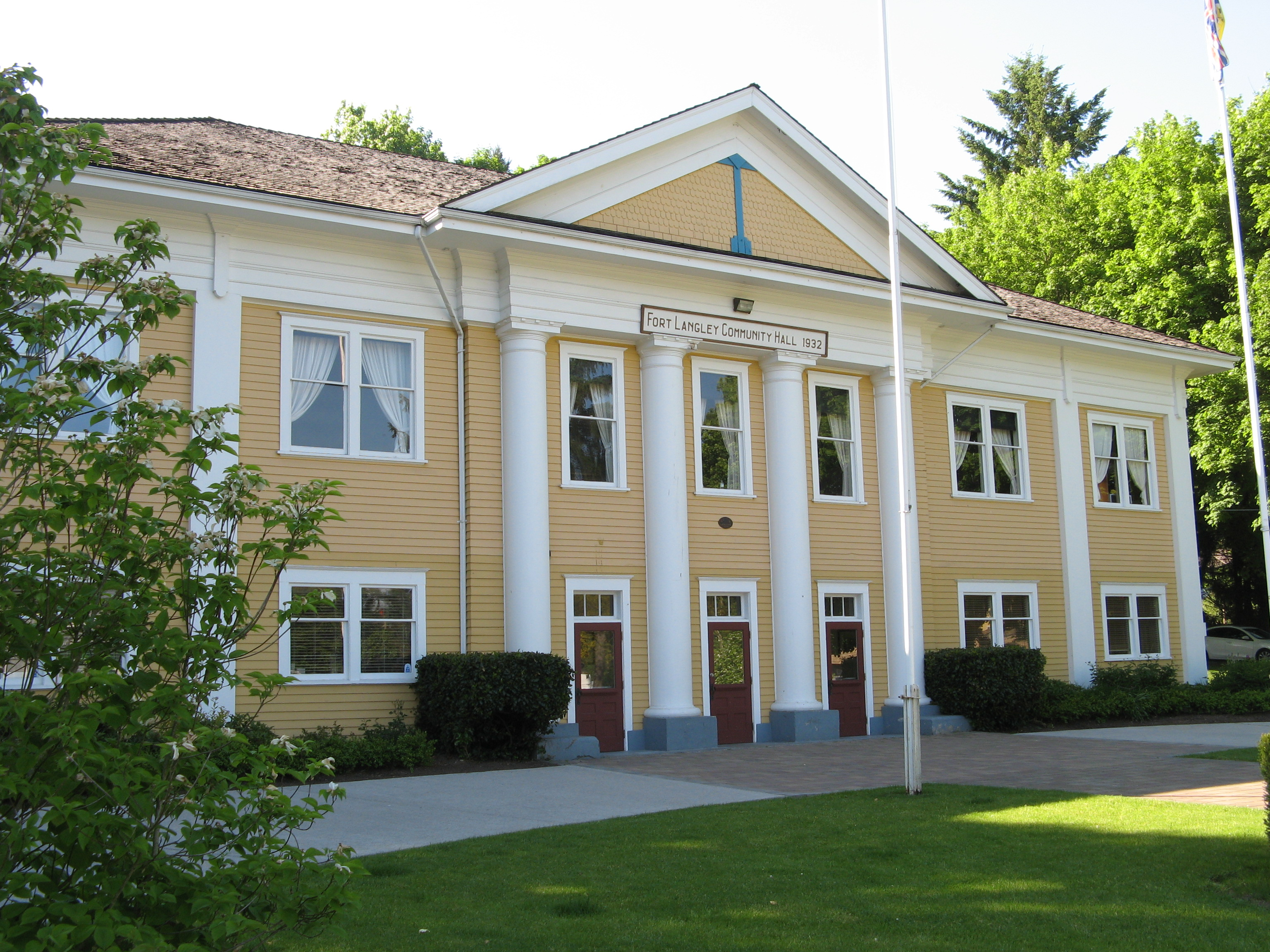
- Fort Langley Community Hall

- Location within British Columbia Location within Canada
- Coordinates: 49°10′06.78″N 122°34′47.15″W
- Country: Canada
- Province: British Columbia
- Region: Lower Mainland
- Regional district: Metro Vancouver
- District Municipality: Langley
- Established: 1827

Government
  - Mayor of The Township of Langley: Eric Woodward

Area
  - Total: 2 km^{2} (0.77 sq mi)
  - Land: 2 km^{2} (0.77 sq mi)

Population (2021)
  - Total: 3,836
  - Density: 1,751/km^{2} (4,540/sq mi)
- Time zone: UTC-8 (Pacific (PST))
  - Summer (DST): UTC-7 (PDT)
- Area codes: 604, 778, 236

Fort Langley is a village community in Township of Langley, British Columbia, Canada. It has a population of approximately 3,400 people. It is the home of Fort Langley National Historic Site, a former fur trade post of the Hudson's Bay Company. Lying on the Fraser River, Fort Langley is at the northern edge of the Township of Langley.

== History ==
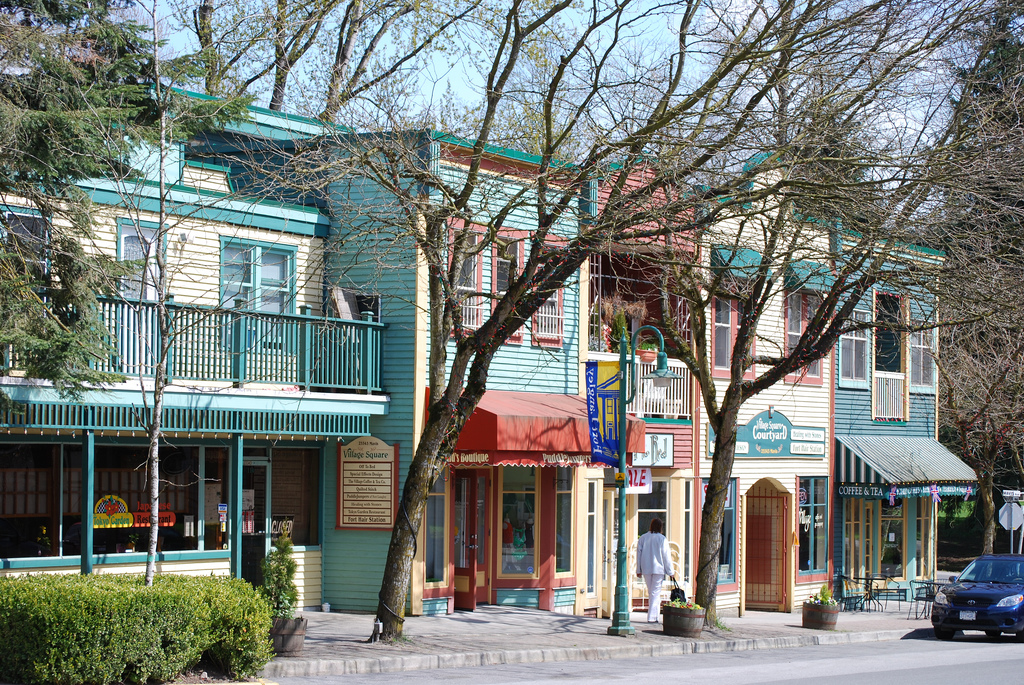
Historic heritage buildings on Mavis Avenue

Fort Langley was named after Thomas Langley, a director with HBC. and dates from a time when the boundary between British and American possession of the trans-mountain west, known as the Columbia District to the British and Oregon Country to Americans, had not yet been decided. Sir George Simpson, Governor of the Hudson's Bay Company, realized that Fort Vancouver opposite of present-day Portland, Oregon might be lost to the Americans if the border did not follow the Columbia River. Fearing the 49th parallel north could become the demarcation line, Simpson ordered the Hudson's Bay Company to construct the original Fort Langley in 1827 at a location 4 km downstream from its present site. Fort Langley was intentionally constructed on the south bank of the Fraser River in the event that Fort Vancouver was lost to the Americans, then Fort Langley would secure British claims to both sides of the Fraser. By 1830, Fort Langley had become a major export port for salted salmon in barrels, as well as cedar lumber and shingles to the Hawaiian Islands. The Cowlitz Portage overland route connected Fort Langley to Fort Vancouver with a mid-way stop at Fort Nisqually on Puget Sound.

As Simpson feared, when the Oregon Boundary Dispute was finally settled in 1846, the border was established as 49 N. In the days before the Colony of Vancouver Island and the Colony of British Columbia united, Governor Sir James Douglas chose Fort Langley to be the provisional colonial capital.

By 1858, a town by the name of Derby, adjacent to the original location of the Fort, had been surveyed and subdivided into town lots and sold. Construction had begun on a barracks for the Royal Engineers, however, when Colonel Richard Moody, commanding officer of the Royal Engineers, visited Derby that year, he disapproved of Douglas' choice in location. He noted American territory lay just a few miles away across easily traversed land and that Fort Langley would be impossible to defend against attack. On 14 February 1859, Moody selected a new site at the mouth of the Pitt River on the north side of the Fraser and suggested the town be named Queensborough. In July of that year, Governor Douglas announced Her Majesty had decided the new capital should be named New Westminster.

Prior to the Fraser Canyon Gold Rush, Fort Langley had been an important export port for cedar lumber, cedar shakes, and salted salmon packed in Douglas Fir and White Pine barrels for ships heading to the Hawaiian Islands. Once the military functions of Fort Langley had been largely outsourced to the new capital of New Westminster, the town of Derby went into decline and in order to accommodate the increased number of ships visiting the Fort, a new location was selected along the Bedford Channel, protected from the river current by McMillan Island and Brae Island. The new location is where the town of Fort Langley is now located, where Glover Road meets the Fraser River.

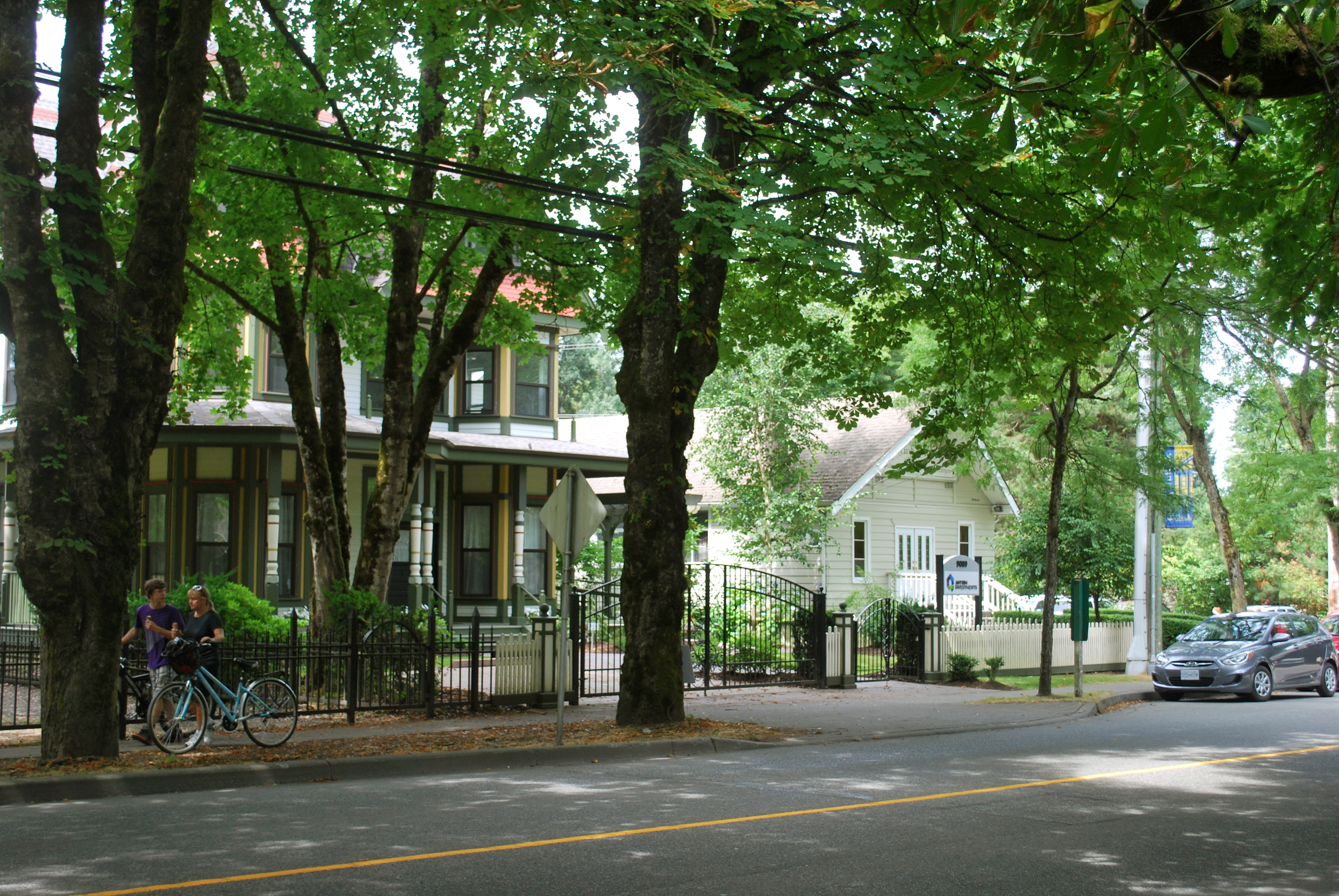
The 'Morrow House' building (now owned by Antrim Investments) can be seen here behind the Horse Chestnut trees that line Glover Road

Between the 1850s and the 1920s, the town of Fort Langley witnessed the threat of Russian invasion in the early 1850s, the threat of American invasion in 1857 at the discovery of gold in the Fraser River, the unification of the colonies of Vancouver Island and British Columbia in 1858, the boom and bust of the Gold Rush from 1858 to 1865, Canadian Confederation in 1867, and the arrival of the first train early in the 20th century. In 1921, a major saw mill opened on an 88-acre riverfront property. The mill brought jobs and prosperity to the struggling town since the railway had removed most of the shipping roles of Fort Langley. The town largely grew up around the mill becoming a blue collar working class community through the 1960s and 70s. By the end of the 1980s, redundancy and aging machinery meant the end was nearing for the mill. Interfor downsized its staff and, for a time, tried to reinvent the mill into a value-added venture but by the mid-1990s, the mill shut down for good.

In 1921, Dr. Benjamin Marr planted Horse Chestnut trees along the Glover Road frontage of their property in Fort Langley. Today these trees can be seen when entering the Downtown.

With the increase in education levels and a transition from blue collar to white collar commuters and professionals, demand for new housing in this quaint village has skyrocketed. The former site of the local lumber mill was controversially rezoned for medium density residential in 2005 and in 2006 construction began on a massive masterplanned community that has been named Bedford Landing. This new development will eventually add approximately 1,500 new people to a community that has prized itself on having a stable population of around 2,500 to 3,000 for multiple generations.

== Indigenous People ==
The Kwantlen First Nation administers an Indian Reserve on McMillan Island, across Bedford Channel from Fort Langley. The local First Nations were important trade partners of the Hudson's Bay Company in Fort Langley, and many workers at the Fort married women from the local First Nations.

== Present day ==
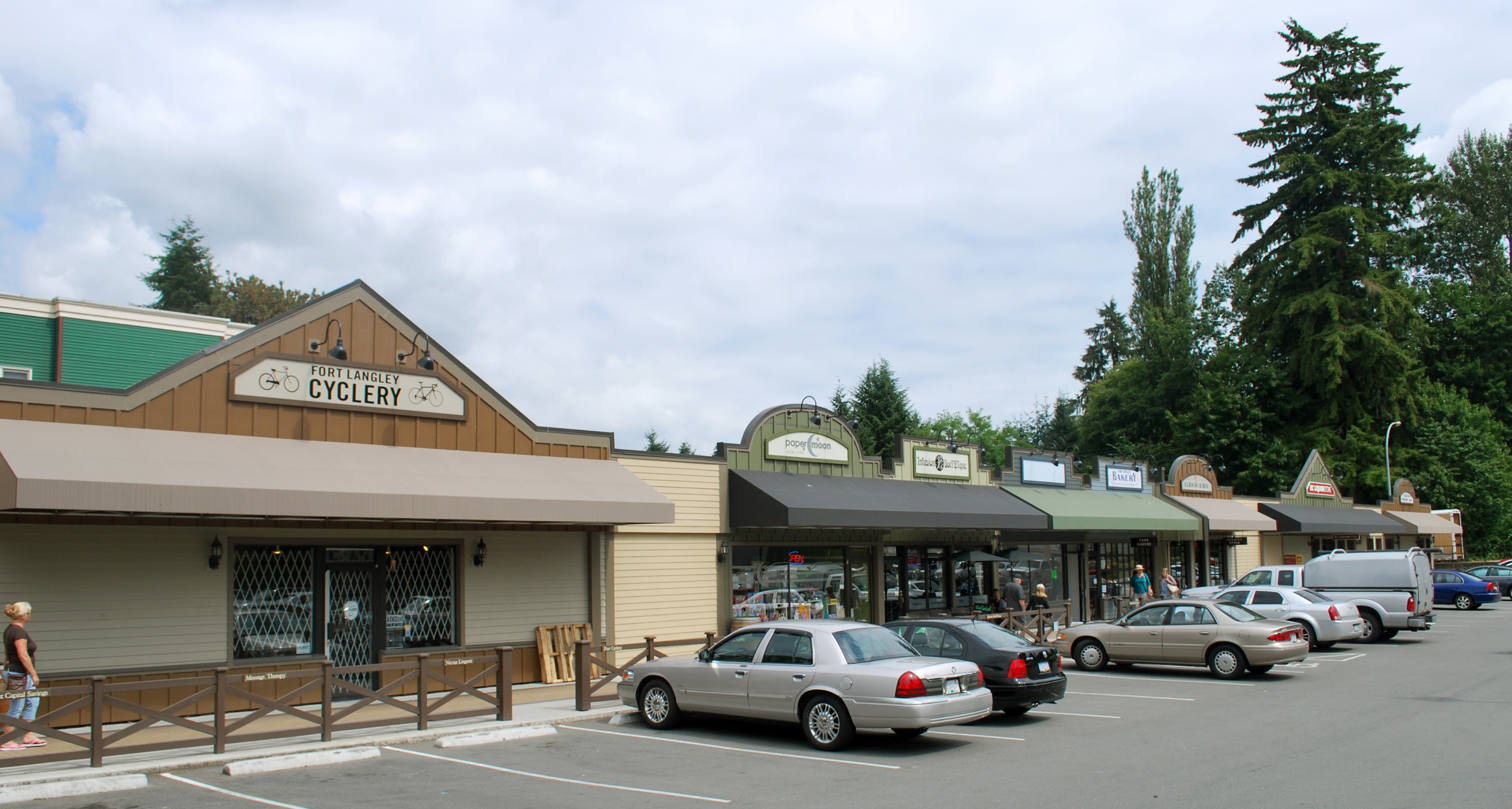
Heritage style Fort Mall

In recent years, many of the village's old buildings have been restored. The restorations, combined with its rural setting, access to the river and mountain vistas, local amenities and the old Fort itself, make it a thriving tourist centre. Outdoor recreation includes canoeing, fishing, hiking and horseback riding. The town has served as a filming location for commercials, TV shows and movies, with its striking yellow community hall usually featured prominently.

Many new buildings in the area have been constructed in Fort Langley in the past few decades. All new buildings must follow strict style guidelines to match the heritage appearance, unless a variance is granted by the local government. A recent example of this style of architecture is the Fort Mall (pictured). Additionally, there are few franchises in the village and this has raised its profile as a tourist and independent retail destination with hundreds of thousands of annual visitors.

The Coulter Berry building is a Leadership in Energy and Environmental Design (LEED) Gold landmark development that was built on the corner of Mavis and Glover in 2016, by developer Eric Woodward. The three-storey building includes retail shopping spaces, commercial offices and restaurants, and merges contemporary elements with a heritage style design. In 2016, the Coulter Berry Building won the best mixed-use category award at the Fraser Valley Commercial Building Awards.

Downtown Fort Langley lies on the Fraser River and public walkway along the bank was built as part of the Trans-Canada Trail, in addition to a rowing facility which was completed in 2009.

TinyKittens Society is based in Fort Langley.

== Culture ==
=== Community Hall and Library ===
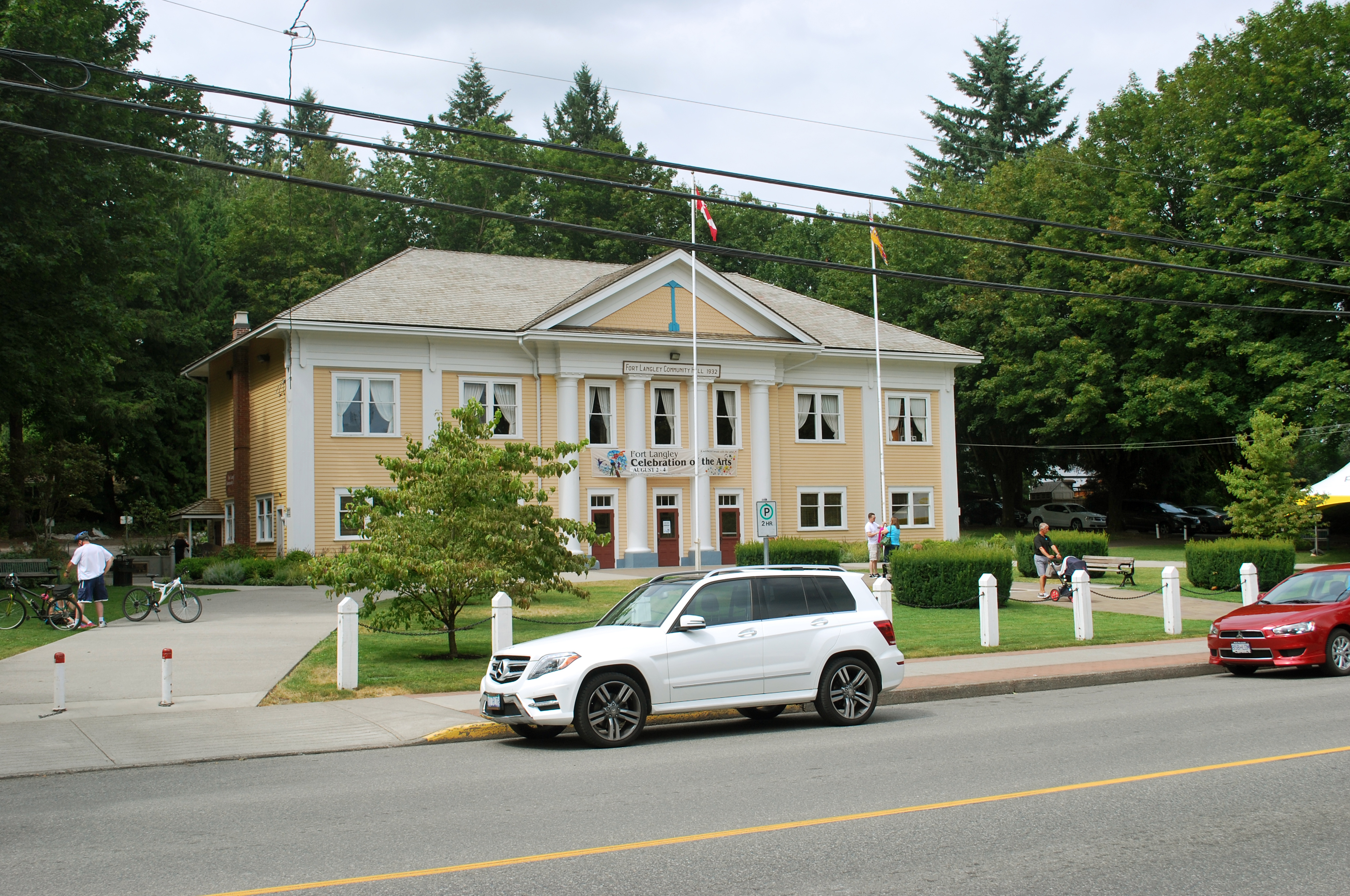
Fort Langley Community Hall

The historic Fort Langley Community Hall houses meeting space and a branch of the Fraser Valley Regional Library. The Fort Langley Community Improvement Society was founded by the Fort Langley Women's Institute in 1924 in order to build the Community Center which you see represented here in photos. This Community Hall was completed in 1931, by hired hands and volunteers - the architect was Archibald Campbell Hope, brother of Fort Langley entrepreneur Charles Hope. The Fort Langley Community Hall has been featured in many films and TV series, including the film series Air Bud and the television series Once Upon a Time. Today, the hall houses events from community meetings, to craft markets, to weddings. As it was in the beginning, this hall is privately held by the Fort Langley Community Improvement Society, not the Township of Langley, and is operated by a volunteer board of directors.

=== Parks ===
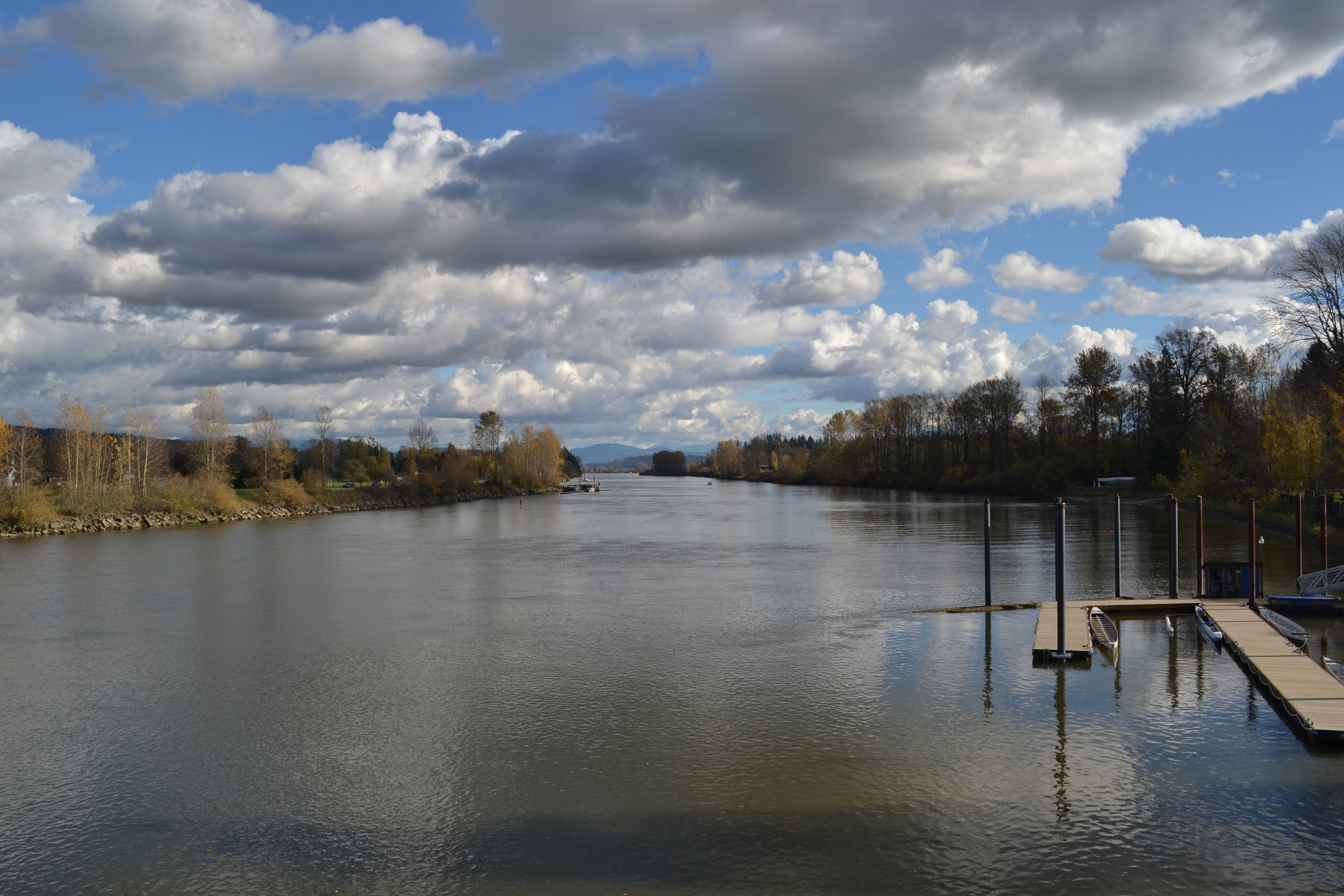
View of Bedford Channel

A number of parks serve the Fort Langley community. These include Fort Langley Community Park, Hudson's Bay Park, Brae Island Regional Park and Marina Park. Marina Park is home to Fort Langley's Boat Launch providing access to Bedford Channel. Brae Island Regional Park is home to Fort Camping, a group campsite and RV campsite.

=== Merchants ===
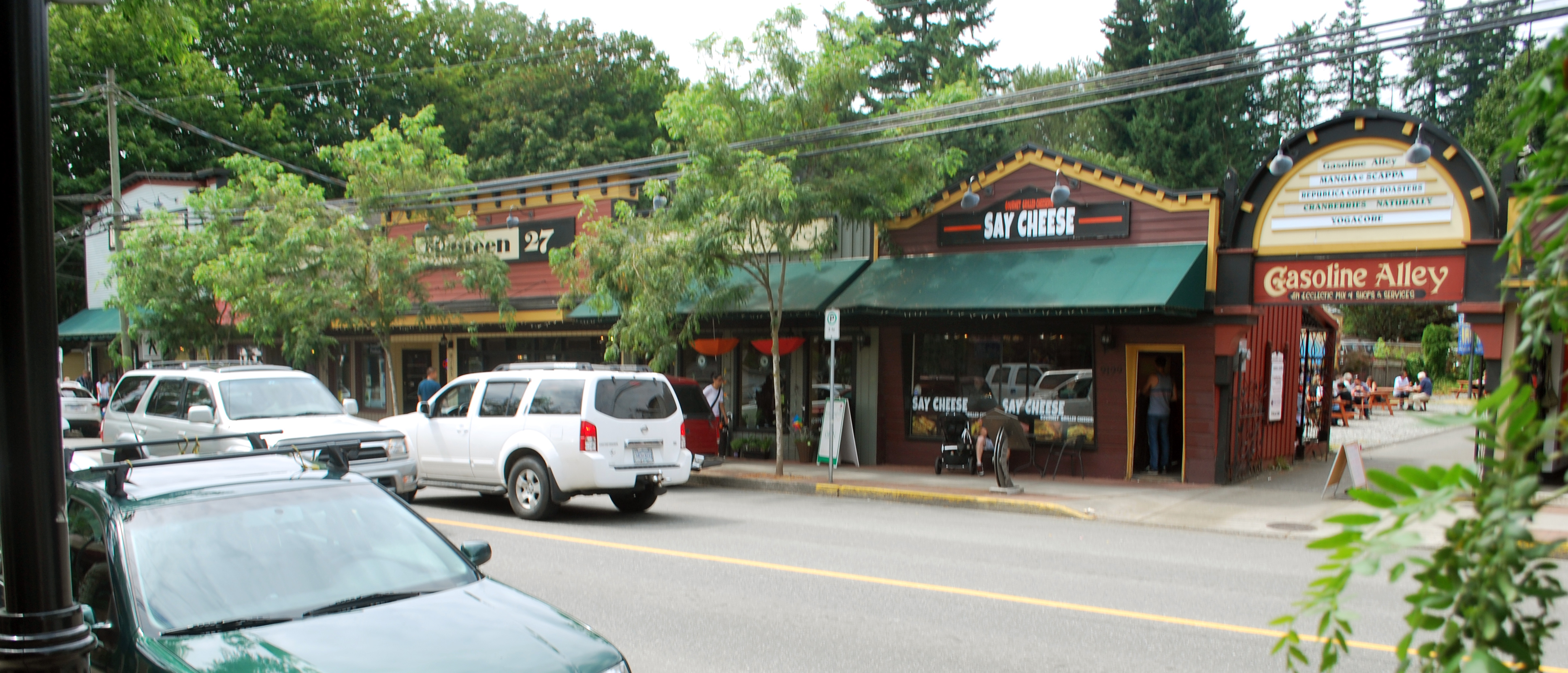
Glover Road in Fort Langley Downtown

Glover Road is a popular shopping street that goes through the centre of Fort Langley. It is frequented by residents of Langley as well as tourists for its selection of independent businesses and historic character.

Fort Langley has about eighty businesses and its commercial core has a mix of services, restaurants and retail stores. In early January 2011, the IGA which had served the community since the 1970s burned down late at night. In 2012, the same owners reopened a new store (Lee's Market), keeping the traditional and mandatory historic appearance that is specific to Fort Langley.

Fort Langley acts as the amenity and service hub for a number of satellite communities such as Forest Knolls to the south, Glen Valley to the east and the Kwantlen First Nations to the north. It is also a popular destination for residents of Walnut Grove to the west.

=== Museums ===
- The Fort Langley National Historic Site is a former fur trading post located in the community which attracts about 60,000 visitors a year.
- The BC Farm and Equipment Museum houses a collection of antique farming equipment.
- The Langley Centennial Museum exhibits local historical artifacts and provides cultural programming.

=== Events ===
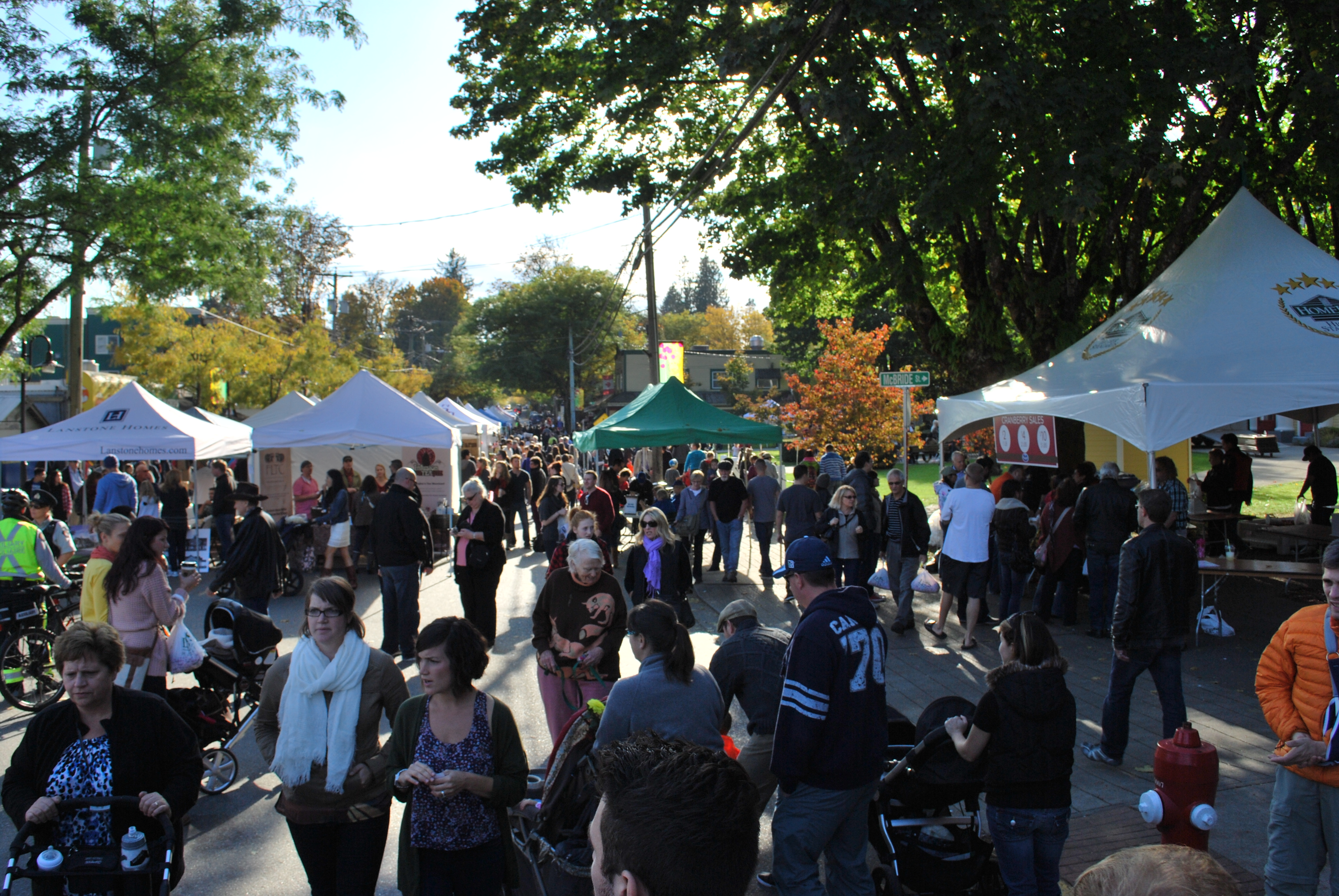
Fort Langley Cranberry Festival 2013

The Cranberry Festival began in 1995 and happens every October. It is operated by the Fort Langley Business Improvement Association.

On July 1 every year, the Centennial Museum, the BC Farm Museum and Fort Langley National Historic Site organize the Township of Langley's Canada Day celebrations, partnering with other arts and heritage groups.

A May Day celebration is held on Victoria Day annually in Fort Langley, consisting of a parade and party in a local park with Maypole dancing.

The annual Fort Langley Jazz Festival was launched in July 2018.

== Transportation ==
=== Roads ===
The main road into and out of Fort Langley is Glover Road, which provides access to the British Columbia Highway 1 via 216 Street or 232 Street interchanges, as well as British Columbia Highway 10, to the City of Langley. Secondary routes such as 88 Avenue, 96 Avenue and River Road connect Fort Langley to the nearby town centre of Walnut Grove and the rest of the Langley Township.

The majority of roads in Fort Langley break from the numerical grid system used elsewhere in the South Fraser Region and retain historical names.

The Jacob Haldi Bridge connects Fort Langley with McMillan Island, across Bedford Channel.

=== Airport ===
The private Fort Langley Airport has a paved runway and floatplane facilities and is located east of the community. General Aviation users primarily use the Langley Regional Airport 8 kilometres (5.0 mi) south of the community.

=== Albion Ferry (closed) ===
Until 2009, commuters and other motorists heading to and from the Albion Ferry connecting with Maple Ridge passed through Fort Langley. After the opening of the Golden Ears Bridge, however, the ferry was decommissioned on July 31, 2009. The ferry terminal is now abandoned. This has significantly reduced the commuter traffic through the commercial core of Fort Langley.

=== Bus ===
Fort Langley is served by TransLink's 562 bus. It will take you to either Langley Centre or Walnut Grove, Langley (Carvolth Exchange).

== Infrastructure ==
=== Fire Hall ===
The community is served by the Township of Langley Fire Department Hall 2, staffed by paid on-call firefighters.

== Education ==
Served by School District 35 Langley, Fort Langley has two schools; Fort Langley Elementary School, and Langley Fine Arts School (a specialty arts-focused Kindergarten-12 school). Trinity Western University is located just south of Fort Langley.

== In popular culture ==
The railway station is featured in the music video for the Punjabi song "Mera Deewanapan" by Amrinder Gill.

An episode of the TV series The X-Files entitled "Home", set in the village of Home, Pennsylvania, was actually filmed near Fort Langley and Surrey, with the Fort Langley Community Hall doubling as a sheriff's station.

The TV series Riverdale features the Fort Gallery at 9048 Glover Rd as the Riverdale Register, and season two features a building in the 23300 block of Mavis Avenue.

Other productions filmed in Fort Langley include Air Bud, Once Upon a Time, Twilight, Bates Motel, Big Sky, Sonic the Hedgehog 2, Fire Country and Supernatural. The town is a popular site for filming due to its historic architecture and small-town character.

Scenes from season 2 of the HBO series The Last of Us set in Jackson Hole, Wyoming were filmed in Fort Langley as well as other locales in the area such as Langley.
