= Siwash =

Siwash is a Chinook Jargon word for native peoples, derived from the French sauvage ("wild"). The term may also refer to:

- Siwash College, a fictional school in the stories of George H. Fitch
- Siwash Creek (British Columbia), Canada
- Siwash sweater, another name for a Cowichan sweater, which is made with Cowichan knitting
- Siwash Rock, a rock outcropping in Vancouver, British Columbia, Canada
- USS Siwash (SP-12), a United States Navy patrol vessel in commission from 1917 to 1919
- Sergeant Siwash, a duck that fought in World War II
- Naswhito Creek, British Columbia, Canada, also called Siwash

== See also ==
- Sivash, a system of lagoons on the west coast of the Sea of Azov
