= Pacific Northwest oyster industry =

Thousands of years prior to European settlement of the Pacific Northwest of the United States the native oyster species Ostrea lurida had been established as a valuable dietary resource for indigenous people living on the coastal waters. European settlers who began to colonize the Pacific Northwest developed an acquired taste for shellfish, especially oysters, a delicacy that were considered to be a symbol of wealth. In the early history of the Pacific Northwest, people satisfied their hunger for shellfish by harvesting naturally occurring oyster beds. It was initially believed that the populations of indigenous oysters were sufficient to supply both tribal and commercial harvest. A marketable industry was created on the export of oysters and soon exploitation of harvesting had depleted the natural oyster beds in California and Oregon. As a result, Washington state became the main supplier to areas along the coast which had failed to establish any conservation practices. Noticing the economic value and decline of natural availability, farmers began efforts to cultivate oysters to try to satisfy demand. Over the years the oyster industry of the Pacific Northwest has gone from extremely lucrative to completely nonexistent, but still the industry has been able to adapt and survive.

== Native American history ==
For the centuries prior to the arrival of European settlement, the native tribes inhabiting the Pacific coast consumed animals from the sea. For example, the native people known as the Siwash or "Fish Eaters" included oysters as a main staple in their diet. Evidence of this claim has been proven by the discovery of large piles of discarded shells known as "middens" with specimens dating back 3000–4000 years. The native peoples use of the oyster was a respectful practice and their appreciation for the oyster can be found in their mythology. One legend states that humankind colonized the planet after being able to free themselves from the inside of a sealed oyster. As more white immigrants began to establish settlements along the coast the native people realized the value of oyster and began to harvest them to trade with their new neighbors. In cities such as Tacoma and Seattle it was not uncommon to see natives selling baskets of harvested oysters to the white settlers. Although evidence shows native people engaged in harvesting of oysters, the amount extracted was not great enough to deplete the naturally occurring oyster beds.

== Washington State ==
Early European settlers who arrived in Washington were fueled by Manifest Destiny and held the belief that all natural resources were a gift from God. This idea allowed exploitation in the harvest of natural resources such as oysters, lumber, and salmon. The proof of this mismanagement is shown in the lack of conservation efforts taken by oyster harvesters in the early days of the industry boom. After the native oyster beds of Northern California and Oregon had been depleted, sailing ships began to travel to Willapa Bay which contained vast acreages of native oysters that had been allowed to grow for many years. Between the years 1851-1915 it is estimated that European settlers had removed more than 5 billion individual oysters from Willapa Bay without any consideration of involving cultivation techniques to seed the harvested areas for future oyster populations.

Eventually Washington's native oyster beds were also depleted, but some harvesters recognized the problem and began to take measures to establish regulations on the industry. In an effort to halt the collapse the Washington state legislature passed the Callow Act in 1890 not even a year after Washington had established statehood. The act allowed oyster farmers to purchase tidelands from the government as long as they contained no natural beds. Once the native oyster beds had been exhausted farmers began to import and plant the seeds of Pacific Oyster Crassostrea gigas from Japan. This species proved easier to manage than the native Olympia Oyster and until the present day has been the industries primary focus in oyster growing. Exploitation of harvest is not the only factor attributed to the decline of native oyster populations, pollution has also been attributed to the industry decline. One of the most notable examples occurred in Shelton on the tides of Oakland Bay where pollution from a sulfite lumber mill killed off entire populations of planted oysters. Although there has been debate over whether the lumber mill is to blame, it has been shown that the oyster's population numbers declined during the mills time of operation and increased after it had been closed.

Currently Washington's oyster industries annually harvest more than 7 million pounds of oyster meat at a value estimated around 70 million dollars. Natural oyster beds will never be able to support the numbers needed to meet market demands, but the oyster industry has continued to endure. Learning from past mistakes has led present day farming companies to employ more conservation practices to ensure water quality and healthy specimens.
