= Naswhito Creek =

Creek in the Okanagan region of British Columbia, Canada

Coordinates: 50°16′12″N 119°26′14″W

Naswhito Creek is located in the Okanagan region of British Columbia. The creek flows into Okanagan Lake from the west. Naswhito Creek is located a few miles south of Vernon, British Columbia. The creek is also called Siwash Creek which should not be confused with Siwash Creek near Princeton, British Columbia. Naswhito Creek has been mined for gold.
