= Siwash Creek (British Columbia) =

Creek in the Similkameen region of British Columbia, Canada

Coordinates: 49°40′N 120°20′W

Siwash Creek is a creek located in the Similkameen region of British Columbia. It flows into Hayes Creek approximately 3 miles (4.8 km) west of Jellicoe and 20 miles (32 km) northeast of Princeton, British Columbia. The creek has been mined for gold. The term "Siwash" is considered by some (Indigenous people, particularly in the Pacific Northwest region of North America) to be derogatory, but remains in use in certain place names and contexts without negative connotations such as Siwash sweater. Nashwito Creek has also been referred to as Siwash Creek, in some instances.
