= USS Siwash =

Patrol vessel of the United States Navy

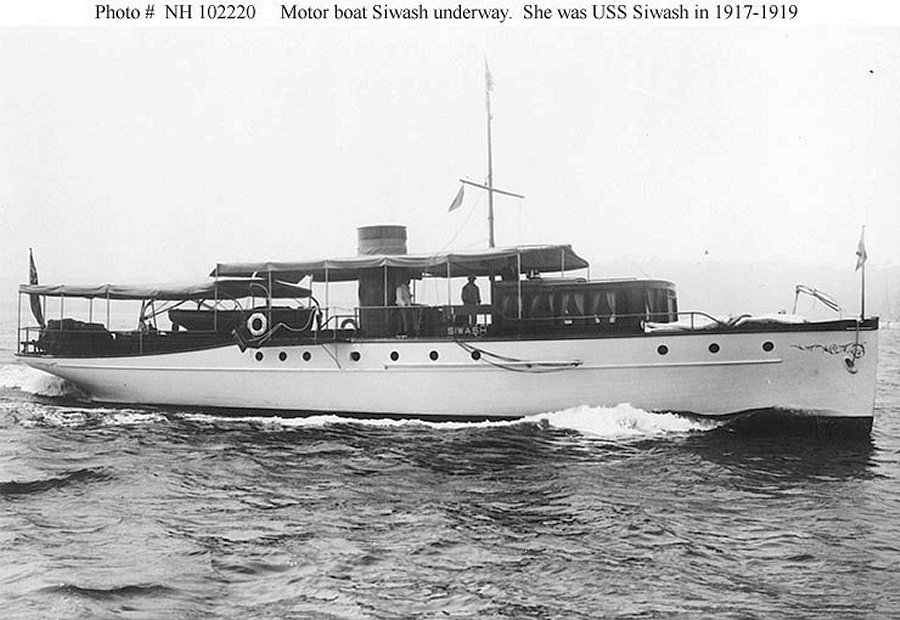
- Siwash in 1916-1917, prior to her U.S. Navy service

History

United States
- Name: USS Siwash
- Namesake: Previous name retained
- Builder: Gas Engine and Power Company, Morris Heights, New York
- Completed: 1916
- Acquired: 18 June 1917
- Commissioned: 18 August 1917
- Decommissioned: 10 May 1919
- Fate: Transferred to U.S. Department of Commerce 16 June 1919
- Notes: Operated as private motorboat Siwash 1916-1917

General characteristics
- Type: Patrol vessel
- Tonnage: 56 tons
- Length: 78 ft (24 m)
- Beam: 14 ft 9 in (4.50 m)
- Draft: 4 ft 1 in (1.24 m)
- Speed: 13 knots
- Complement: 15
- Armament: 1 × 1-pounder gun; 1 × machine gun

USS Siwash (SP-12) was an armed motorboat that served in the United States Navy as a patrol vessel from 1917 to 1919.

Siwash was built in 1916 by the Gas Engine and Power Company at Morris Heights, New York, as a private motorboat of the same name. The U.S. Navy acquired her from her owner, C. A. Schieren of New York City, on 18 June 1917 for World War I service. She was commissioned as USS Siwash (SP-12) on 18 August 1917.

Siwash patrolled in the 3rd Naval District in the New York City area until decommissioned on 10 May 1919. She was transferred to the United States Department of Commerce on 16 June 1919.
