= Monterey Jazz Festival =

Annual music festival in California since 1958

Coordinates: 36°35′40″N 121°51′46″W

- 50th Golden Celebration Poster (2007)
- Genre: Jazz, blues, rock
- Locations: Monterey, California, US
- Years active: 1958–present (Note: The 2020 event was cancelled due to the COVID-19 pandemic, but in subsequent numberings it is still counted as the 63rd festival.)
- Website: montereyjazzfestival.org

The Monterey Jazz Festival is an annual music festival that takes place in Monterey, California, United States. It debuted on October 3, 1958, championed by Dave Brubeck and co-founded by jazz and popular music critic Ralph J. Gleason and jazz disc jockey Jimmy Lyons.

== History ==
The festival is held annually on the 20-acre (8 ha), oak-studded Monterey County Fairgrounds, located at 2004 Fairground Road in Monterey, on the third full weekend in September, beginning on Friday. Five hundred top jazz artists perform on nine stages spread throughout the grounds, with 50 concert performances. In addition, the Monterey Jazz Festival features jazz conversations, panel discussions, workshops, exhibitions, clinics, and an international array of food, shopping, and festivities spread throughout the fairgrounds.

From 1992 to 2010, Tim Jackson was general manager and artistic director, and in 2010, Chris Doss became the managing director, and Jackson became the artistic director. In 2014, Colleen Bailey became the managing director. Since 1992, Clint Eastwood has been on MJF's board of directors. Kent and Keith Zimmerman describe the festival as having expanded in recent years: "While jazz radio and major labels cut back on musical choice and commitment, the Monterey Jazz Festival has widened its scope by expanding the parameters of jazz, blues, and rock. . . . Happily, MJF is now as diverse and vibrant as Lyons imagined it ever could be." The 66th festival in 2023 was Tim Jackson's last year as artistic director. Darin Atwater is the current artistic director of the festival.

In 2006, the festival set an attendance record of 40,000, selling out all five major concerts on the main stage arena, and in 2007, 40,000 attended the 50th Golden Celebration.

Since there was no festival in 2020, the 63rd was deferred to 2021. The COVID-19 pandemic caused officials to cancel it.

The Monterey Jazz Festival is a nonprofit organization. It has donated its proceeds to musical education since its inception in 1958. The festival's scholarship program started with a $35,000 scholarship fund in 1970. As of 2012, the festival invests $600,000 annually for jazz education. Every spring, the Monterey Jazz Festival invites student musicians from across the country and around the world to participate in the "Next Generation Festival".

Paul Contos has served as saxophone clinician with The Monterey Jazz Festival for 30 yrs, as Director of the Next Generation Jazz Orchestra & Monterey County All-Stars for 20 yrs, and as Education Director for the Monterey Jazz Festival (2011-2019) and in 2015 was awarded the Champion of the Arts: Educator Award by the Monterey Arts Council.

Dave Brubeck was instrumental in getting city approval for the first festival in 1958. The founder and general manager of MJF for 35 years, Jimmy Lyons, brought Brubeck to Monterey to perform for the city council to persuade them to allow the festival to occur. He performed at the Festival 14 times which included his appearance at the 2007 / 50th golden anniversary.

The Monterey Pop Festival was held at the fairgrounds in 1967 for three days in mid-June, part of the Summer of Love.

== Performers ==
=== 1950s–1960s ===
1958

- Mort Sahl, Master of Ceremonies, Ernestine Anderson with Gerald Wiggins, Louis Armstrong and His All-Stars, Burt Bales & the Dixie All-Stars, Betty Bennett, Dave Brubeck Quartet, Benny Carter, George Coleman, Buddy DeFranco, Art Farmer, Med Flory Band, Jimmy Giuffre Three with Bob Brookmeyer and Jim Hall, Dizzy Gillespie, Claude Gilroy Quintet, Virgil Gonsalves Sextet, Billie Holiday, Milt Jackson, Harry James Orchestra, John Lewis, Mel Lewis-Bill Holman Quintet, Booker Little, Shelly Manne, Mastersounds with Wes Montgomery, Lizzie Miles, Buddy Montgomery and Monk Montgomery, Modern Jazz Quartet, Monterey Jazz Festival Symphony conducted by Gregory Millar, Brew Moore & Dickie Mills Quintet, Gerry Mulligan, Max Roach, Sonny Rollins, Rudi Salvini Band, Grace Stock, Jake Stock & the Abalone Stompers, Cal Tjader Sextet, Leroy Vinnegar Quartet with Teddy Edwards, Ed Zubov Band

1959

- Lambert, Hendricks & Ross, Master of Ceremonies, "Symphony for Brass & Percussion" by Gunther Schuller, "Three Saxes" by Ernie Wilkins with Ornette Coleman, and Ben Webster, Brass Ensemble performs new works by Werner Heider, Chris Barber, Charlie Byrd & Zoot Sims, Buddy Collette, Count Basie Orchestra with Joe Williams, Benny Golson, Coleman Hawkins & Orchestra, Woody Herman & the All Stars with Ernestine Anderson, Earl Hines, André Hodeir, Paul Horn, J.J. Johnson and John Lewis, John Lewis and Quincy Jones, George Lewis New Orleans Band, Lizzie Miles, Modern Jazz Quartet, Oscar Peterson Trio with Ray Brown and Ed Thigpen, Cal Tjader Quintet, Jimmy Witherspoon, Sarah Vaughan

1960

- André Previn Trio, Helen Humes, Gerry Mulligan Orchestra, J. J. Johnson, Gunther Schuller, John Coltrane Quartet, Jon Hendricks with Miriam Makeba, Clarence Horatius Miller, Odetta, Jimmy Witherspoon, Duke Ellington Orchestra, Louis Armstrong All-Stars, Lambert, Hendricks & Ross, Cannonball Adderley, Jimmy Rushing, Modern Jazz Quartet, Ornette Coleman Quintet, Montgomery Brothers Quartet.

1961

- Dave Brubeck Quartet, John Coltrane Quartet with Eric Dolphy & Wes Montgomery, Duke Ellington, Dizzy Gillespie Quintet, Carmen McRae, Odetta, Jimmy Rushing, George Shearing Quintet

1962

- Louis Armstrong All-Stars, Dave Brubeck, Stan Getz Quartet, Dizzy Gillespie Quintet, Quincy Jones & the Monterey Jazz Festival Orchestra, Carmen McRae, Gerry Mulligan Quartet

1963

- Carmen McRae, Miles Davis Quintet, Dizzy Gillespie Quintet, Dave Brubeck Quartet, Herbie Hancock, Modern Jazz Quartet, Thelonious Monk Quartet, Jon Hendricks, Harry James Orchestra, Jimmy Witherspoon, The Andrews Sisters & the Gospel Song, and Helen Merrill, Joe Sullivan

1964

- Duke Ellington Orchestra, Dizzy Gillespie Quintet, Miles Davis Quintet w/ Wayne Shorter, Herbie Hancock, Ron Carter & Tony Williams, Gerry Mulligan, Thelonious Monk Quartet, Lou Rawls, Joe Williams, Woody Herman, Art Farmer Quartet, Charles Mingus, and Big Mama Thornton.

1965

- Louis Armstrong All-Stars, Duke Ellington Orchestra, Dizzy Gillespie Quintet w/ Mary Stallings, Cal Tjader Quintet, John Handy Quintet, Clark Terry, Earl "Fatha" Hines, Harry James New Swingin' Band w/ Buddy Rich, Anita O'Day, Mary Lou Williams, and Ethel Ennis

1966

- Duke Ellington Orchestra, Count Basie Orchestra, Dave Brubeck Quartet, Don Ellis Orchestra, Gerry Mulligan, Cannonball Adderley Quintet, Carmen McRae, Big Mama Thornton, Jefferson Airplane, Jimmy Rushing, Muddy Waters Band, Randy Weston, Bola Sete, and Charles Lloyd

1967

- T-Bone Walker, B. B. King, the Clara Ward Singers, Dizzy Gillespie Quintet, Modern Jazz Quartet, Ornette Coleman Quartet, Gil Mellé, Gábor Szabó, Carmen McRae, Earl "Fatha" Hines, Richie Havens, and Big Brother and the Holding Company w/ Janis Joplin

1968

- Dizzy Gillespie Quintet, Count Basie Orchestra, Oscar Peterson Trio, Modern Jazz Quartet, Cal Tjader Quintet, Mel Tormé, B. B. King, Muddy Waters, Billy Eckstine, Big Mama Thornton, and George Duke Trio w/ Third Wave

1969

- Miles Davis Quintet w/ Wayne Shorter, Chick Corea, Dave Holland & Jack DeJohnette, Thelonious Monk Quartet, Sarah Vaughan, Joe Williams, Cannonball Adderley Quintet, Roberta Flack & Her Trio, Sly and the Family Stone, and Buddy Rich Band

=== 1970s–1980s ===
1970

- Duke Ellington, Modern Jazz Quartet, Cannonball Adderley Quintet, Joe Williams, Johnny Otis Show w/ Little Esther Phillips and Eddie "Cleanhead" Vinson, Woody Herman Orchestra, Buddy Rich Orchestra, Ivory Joe Hunter, Sonny Stitt & Gene Ammons

1971

- Dave Brubeck Quartet, Oscar Peterson Trio, Sarah Vaughan, Carmen McRae, Erroll Garner, Jimmy Witherspoon & Friends, John Handy, and Mary Lou Williams

1972

- Modern Jazz Quartet, John Hendricks, Jimmy Witherspoon, Cal Tjader Quintet, Thelonious Monk, Sonny Rollins Quartet, Joe Williams, Herbie Hancock Septet, Quincy Jones Orchestra, Mary Lou Williams Trio, Roberta Flack

1973

- Dizzy Gillespie Quintet, Carmen McRae, Bo Diddley, Mel Lewis-Thad Jones Orchestra, Dee Dee Bridgewater, Pointer Sisters, Buddy Rich, Clark Terry, Jon Hendricks, Milt Jackson, and Max Roach

1974

- Dizzy Gillespie, Sarah Vaughan, Cal Tjader, Jon Hendricks, Mongo Santamaría, Clark Terry, Bo Diddley, Anita O'Day, Big Joe Turner, James Cotton Blues Band, and Jerome Richardson

1975

- Dizzy Gillespie Quartet with Cal Tjader, Etta James, Bobby "Blue" Bland, Betty Carter, Blood, Sweat & Tears, and Sunnyland Slim, "Piano Playhouse" with Bill Evans, John Lewis, Marian McPartland and Patrice Rushen, The Meters, Toshiko Akiyoshi-Lew Tabackin Big Band

1976

- Dizzy Gillespie, John Faddis, Clark Terry, Cal Tjader Quintet, Paul Desmond Quartet, Jimmy Witherspoon, Bill Berry Big Band, Toshiko Akiyoshi/Lew Tabackin Band, Helen Humes, Heath Brothers, Eje Thelin Quartet, Gerald Wilson, Queen Ida and the Bon Temps Zydeco Band. Also: Matrix.

1977

- 20th Anniversary headliners Cal Tjader, Joe Williams, Benny Carter, George Duke, Tito Puente Orchestra, Horace Silver Quintet, Gerald Wilson, and The Neville Brothers, Queen Ida, Betty Carter, Count Basie Orchestra, John Lewis & Hank Jones, also: Matrix.

1978

- Dizzy Gillespie, Albert Collins, Kenny Burrell, The Hi-Lo's, Billy Cobham, Bob Dorough, Dexter Gordon Quartet, and Ruth Brown, Tony Cook

1979

- Dizzy Gillespie, Diane Schuur, Joe Williams, Aaron Neville, Sonny Stitt, Richie Cole, Flora Purim, Red Mitchell, Scott Hamilton, Earl King, Stan Getz Quintet, Helen Humes, Woody Herman, The Buddy Rich Band, Woody Shaw Quintet, and James Booker

1980

- Sarah Vaughan, Cal Tjader Quartet, Freddie Hubbard Quintet, Manhattan Transfer, Big Joe Turner, and Dave Brubeck Quartet

1981

- Billy Eckstine, Sarah Vaughan, Toshiko Akiyoshi/Lew Tabackin Band, Tania Maria, Tito Puente & Latin Percussion Sextet w/ Poncho Sanchez, and Cal Tjader

1982

- 25th Silver Anniversary headliners Carmen McRae, Dave Brubeck Quartet, Dizzy Gillespie Quartet, Ernestine Anderson, Tito Puente Latin Jazz Big Band, Poncho Sanchez & His Jazz Band, Gerald Wilson & the Orchestra, Mel Lewis Orchestra, Joe Williams, Woody Herman & Ira Sullivan Quintet, and Etta James Band

1983

- Sarah Vaughan, Joe Williams, Tania Maria, Wynton Marsalis Quintet, Mel Tormé, Bobby McFerrin, Bo Diddley, Irma Thomas, and Bobby Hutcherson Percussion Ensemble, Jon Faddis Band, and the Buddy Rich Band

1984

- Ernestine Anderson, Etta James, Tito Puente w/ Dianne Reeves, Clark Terry, James Moody, Bobby McFerrin, Benny Carter, Richie Cole, Al Cohn, and Shelly Mann Trio

1985

- Sarah Vaughan, Joe Williams, Clark Terry, Dave Brubeck Quartet, Woody Herman & the Thudering Herd, Toshiko Akiyoshi/Lew Tabackin Band, Modern Jazz Quartet, and the Gerald Wilson Orchestra

1986

- Tito Puente Latin Jazz Big Band, Art Farmer/Benny Golson Jazztet, Dianne Reeves, George Shearing, Bobby McFerrin, Rare Silk, Sue Raney, Etta James, John Lee Hooker & the Coast to Coast Blues Band, and Linda Hopkins

1987

- 30th Anniversary headliners Ray Charles, B.B. King, Etta James, Stéphane Grappelli, Buddy Guy & Junior Wells, Modern Jazz Quartet, and Woody Herman Band

1988

- Joe Williams, Dianne Reeves, Diane Schuur, Carla Thomas, Mongo Santamaría, Benny Carter, Clark Terry, Richie Cole, Queen Ida & the Bon Temps Zydeco Band

1989

- Freddie Hubbard Quintet w/Bobby Hutcherson, Dizzy Gillespie, Kitty Margolis, Herbie Mann & Jasil Brazz, Madeline Eastman, Tania Maria, Etta James & the Root Band, Jimmy McCracklin

=== 1990–1999 ===
1990

- Dianne Reeves, Joe Williams, Oscar Peterson, Ernestine Anderson, Rebecca Parris, Etta James, Kitty Margolis, Michel Petrucciani Group, Spyro Gyra, Stan Getz Sextet, Stanley Turrentine Quintet, and the Gerald Wilson Orchestra

1991

- Count Basie Orchestra, Phil Woods Quintet, Modern Jazz Quintet, Diane Schuur, Chick Corea, Charles Brown, Ruth Brown, Jon Hendricks & Company, Carol Sloane, and Jimmy McCracklin & the Linettes, Paquito D'Rivera and his New Band with guest Dizzy Gillespie

1992

- Herbie Hancock, Wynton Marsalis, Branford Marsalis Quartet, Kenny Burrell, Ron Carter, George Duke, Jimmy Smith, Stanley Turrentine, Betty Carter, Kitty Margolis, Dave Brubeck Quartet, Modern Jazz Quartet, Yellowjackets, Roy Hargrove Quintet, George Duke

1993

- Dianne Reeves, Clark Terry, Nat Adderley, Ron Carter, Joe Williams, Rubén Blades, Madeline Eastman, McCoy Tyner Big Band w/ Bobby Hutcherson, Charles Lloyd Quartet, Fourplay, the Brecker Brothers, Dr. John and the New Island Social and Pleasure Club, Bobby Watson and Horizon, Dirty Dozen Brass Band, Full Faith and Credit Big Band, Danny Barker and Milt Hinton, Sumi Tonooka Trio, C. J. Chenier and the Red Hot Louisiana Band, Oakland Interfaith Gospel Choir, Bobby Bradford Motet, Ray Brown and the Great Big Band

1994

- Sonny Rollins, Ornette Coleman & Prime Time, Max Roach & M'Boom, Shirley Horn Trio, Grover Washington, Jr., Etta James & the Roots Band, Nnenna Freelon, Terence Blanchard Quartet w/Jeanie Bryson, and Kyle Eastwood Quartet (Clint Eastwood's son)

1995

- Bobby McFerrin, Madeline Eastman, Chick Corea Akoustic Quartet, Stéphane Grappelli, Lee Ritenour/Dave Grusin All-Stars, Gene Harris Band, Rebecca Parris, Staple Singers, Charlie Hunter Trio, Lou Donaldson Quartet, Mary Stallings

1996

- George Benson, Herbie Hancock Quartet w/ Joshua Redman, Roy Hargrove & Chucho Valdés, Faye Carol w/ Kito Gamble Trio, Irma Thomas, Jessica Williams Trio, and Kyle Eastwood.

1997

- Diana Krall Trio, Gerald Wilson Orchestra, Sonny Rollins, David Sanborn Group, Myra Melford Trio, Otis Rush, Arturo Sandoval, Koko Taylor & Her Blues Machine, and Charlie Hunter Quartet.

1998

- Dee Dee Bridgewater w/ MJF High School All-Star Big Band, Dave Brubeck Quartet, Elvin Jones Jazz Machine, Bobby Hutcherson Quartet, Tower of Power, and Al Jarreau

1999

- Diana Krall, Terence Blanchard Sextet, Kyle Eastwood, Chris Potter, Joshua Redman, Lew Tabackin, Russell Malone, Clark Terry, Regina Carter, Kenny Barron, Ray Drummond, Ben Riley, The Manhattan Transfer, Ruth Brown, and Bobby "Blue" Bland

=== 2000–2009 ===
2000

- Wayne Shorter Group, Pat Metheny Trio, Dianne Reeves, Mimi Fox Trio, Richard Bona, Rubén Blades, featuring Editus, Lou Rawls–Les McCann Reunion, and Michael McDonald

2001

- Herbie Hancock, Wynton Marsalis, Branford Marsalis Quartet, Taj Mahal, Jimmy Smith, Roberta Gambarini, Jane Monheit, Ravi Coltrane Quartet, McCoy Tyner Trio, Dave Holland Big Band, Regina Carter, and Deborah Coleman

2002

- Nancy Wilson & Ramsey Lewis, Etta James & the Root Band, Marcia Ball, Paula West, Big Time Sarah, Dave Brubeck & Sons, and Lizz Wright

2003

- Nnenna Freelon, Herbie Hancock Quartet w/ Bobby Hutcherson, The Crusaders, and Mary Stallings

2004

- Terence Blanchard Sextet, Bobby McFerrin, Take 6, Regina Carter Quintet, Marian McPartland Trio w/ Lynne Arriale, Chaka Khan, Buddy Guy, and Bettye LaVette

2005

- Tony Bennett, Sonny Rollins, Branford Marsalis Quartet, Mavis Staples, Kyle Eastwood, Larry Carlton & the Sapphire Blues Band w/ special guest Ledisi, John Scofield, Banyan and New Orleans Jazz Vipers

2006

- Oscar Peterson Trio w/ Hank Jones & Clint Eastwood, Dianne Reeves, The Yellowjackets, Oscar Peterson, Bonnie Raitt, Hank Jones, the Charles Lloyd Quartet, Dave Brubeck, McCoy Tyner with Bobby Hutcherson, Roy Hargrove, Robert Lowery, Virgil Thrasher, Hank Jones with vocalist Roberta Gambarini, youthful piano phenomenon Eldar Djangirov, Ben Monder's Trio, and Tierney Sutton with her all star trio, anchored by pianist Christian Jacob, and more.

2007

- 50th Golden Celebration, presented Diana Krall, Sonny Rollins, Ornette Coleman, Dave Brubeck w/ Jim Hall, Gerald Wilson, Ernestine Anderson, John McLaughlin, Dave Holland, Kenny Burrell Quartet, Otis Taylor Band w/ Cassie Taylor, Rashied Ali Quintet, Issac Delgado, Gonzalo Rubalcaba, Los Lobos, James Moody, Vinnie Esparza, Sean Jones, Christian Scott, Cyrus Chestnut, and Terence Blanchard Quintet with Kendrick Scott

Building on the exciting and unprecedented legacy of fifty years of historic jazz presentation, the Monterey Jazz Festival 50th Anniversary Band will tour on 54-date, 10-week tour of the United States from January 8, 2008 to March 16, 2008. The band features jazz singer Nnenna Freelon, with trumpeter Terence Blanchard, pianist Benny Green, saxophonist James Moody, bassist Derrick Hodge and drummer Kendrick Scott.

2008

- Nancy Wilson, Herbie Hancock, Cassandra Wilson, Terence Blanchard, Tom Scott, Maria Schneider Jazz Orchestra, Christian McBride Quintet, Kyle Eastwood, Joshua Redman Trio, The Derek Trucks Band, Maceo Parker, Ledisi, Jamie Cullum, Wayne Shorter Quartet, Kurt Elling, Trio M with Myra Melford, Mark Dresser & Matt Wilson, Tuck & Patti, Barbara Dennerlein Trio

2009

- Dee Dee Bridgewater, Wynton Marsalis, Hank Jones (did not appear due to health concerns), Pete Seeger, Susan Tedeschi, Conrad Herwig, Randy Brecker, Vijay Iyer, Dave Brubeck, John Patitucci, Brian Blade, George Duke, Jason Moran, Regina Carter, Kurt Elling, Russell Malone, Esperanza Spalding, Soulive w/ John Scofield, and Chick Corea, Stanley Clarke and Lenny White and more.

=== Since 2010 ===
2010

- Dianne Reeves, Harry Connick, Jr., Ahmad Jamal, Chick Corea Freedom Band (with Kenny Garrett, Christian McBride, and 2010 Showcase Artist, Roy Haynes), Angelique Kidjo, Roy Hargrove, Billy Childs, Delbert McClinton, Nellie McKay, Les McCann, Les Nubians

2011

- Joshua Redman, Poncho Sanchez Band with special guest Terence Blanchard, Huey Lewis & The News, Eldar, Herbie Hancock, Geri Allen & Timeline, India.Arie & Idan Raichel, Sonny Rollins, Tia Fuller, Beat Maestro, Young Harper

2012

- Dee Dee Bridgewater, Esperanza Spalding, Pat Metheny, Christian McBride, Trombone Shorty

2013

- Diana Krall, George Benson, Mary Stallings, Ravi Coltrane Quartet, Bobby McFerrin, David Sanborn, Wayne Shorter, Omara Portuondo, and Gregory Porter

2014

- Melissa Aldana Crash Trio, Ambrose Akinmusire Quintet, Red Baraat, Jon Batiste & Stay Human, Brian Blade & The Fellowship Band, Blue Note Records 75th Anniversary Band with Ambrose Akinmusire, Donald Brown, Uri Caine with Booker T. Jones, Billy Childs, Gary Clark Jr., Shawn Colvin, Commanders Jazz Ensemble, Davina and the Vagabonds, Aaron Diehl Quartet, Pete Escovedo Orchestra with Peter Michael & Juan Escovedo, Michael Feinstein with Russell Malone & Harry Allen and the Next Generation Jazz Orchestra, Lisa Fischer, Ben Flocks Quartet, Robert Glasper with Jason Moran, Habaneros, Herbie Hancock, John Hanrahan Quartet, Eric Harland Voyager, Derrick Hodge & Lionel Loueke, Zakir Hussain and Eric Harland, Booker T. Jones, Geoffrey Keezer Trio, Bari Koral, Charles Lloyd Quartet with Jason Moran, Charles Lloyd & Gerald Clayton, Harold Lopez-Nussa, Harold Mabern, Delfeayo Marsalis & Ellis Marsalis, Christian McBride Trio, Sarah McKenzie Quartet, Marcus Miller, Minor Thirds Trio, Tony Monaco, Jason Moran Fats Waller Dance Party, Next Generation Jazz Orchestra, The Philadelphia Experiment with Christian McBride, Ana Popović, ?uestlove, Reuben Rogers & Eric Harland, The Roots, Pamela Rose & Wayne De La Cruz, Daniel Rosenboom Quintet, Cécile McLorin Salvant, SambaDa, Sangam with Charles Lloyd, Kendrick Scott, Sourmash Hug Band, Becca Stevens, Youn Sun Nah & Ulf Wakenius, Claudia Villela & Harvey Wainapel, Conversation about Blue Note Records, Conversation about Mulgrew Miller & James Williams, Conversation with Michael Feinstein, DownBeat Blindfold Test, Top bands from the Next Generation Jazz Festival

2015

- Geri Allen presents the Erroll Garner Project: Concert by the Sea featuring Geri Allen, Jason Moran, Christian Sands, Russell Malone, Darek Oles, and Victor Lewis;
- Jaco's World: A Tribute to Jaco Pastorius conducted by Vince Mendoza featuring Will Lee, Christian McBride, Felix Pastorius, Peter Erskine, Tierney Sutton, Sonny Knight, Bob Mintzer, Alex Acuña
- Monterey Jazz Festival on Tour with Raul Midón, Ravi Coltrane, Nicholas Payton, Gerald Clayton, Joe Sanders, and Justin Brown
- Cyrille Aimée, Ambrose Akinmusire Quartet +5, Monty Alexander with John Clayton and Jeff Hamilton, Berklee Global Jazz Institute, Terence Blanchard featuring The E-Collective, Chris Botti, Brothers Comatose, Etienne Charles, Chick Corea & Béla Fleck, Chick Corea with Christian McBride & Brian Blade, Theo Croker and DVRKFUNK, Pete Escovedo Orchestra with Sheila E., James Francies, Nikki Hill, Jazz at Lincoln Center Orchestra with Wynton Marsalis, Kneebody, Sonny Knight & The Lakers, Musette Explosion, Dennis Murphy Band, Next Generation Jazz Orchestra with Wynton Marsalis, Lucky Peterson, Dianne Reeves, Kurt Rosenwinkel New Quartet, Trombone Shorty & Orleans Avenue, Snarky Puppy, Walter Blanding Sextet, Crossing Borders featuring Jennifer Scott & Kristen Strom, Duchess, Kyle Eastwood, Allan Harris and David Gilmore & Energies of Change, Carlos Henriquez: The Deal Maker, Jazz at Lincoln Center Jam Session, Jones Family Singers, Justin Kauflin Quartet, Rudresh Mahanthappa's Bird Calls, Michael O'Neill and Kenny Washington, Ernesto Oviedo with the John Santos Sextet, Lizz Wright, Dann Zinn with Peter Erskine and Chris Robinson
- American Music Program Pacific Crest Combo, Berkeley High School Combo A, Central Washington University Big Band, Folsom High School Big Band, Folsom High School Jazz Choir, Los Angeles County High School for the Arts Jazz Band, Los Angeles County High School for the Arts Jazz Choir, Monterey County High School All-Star Band, Monterey County High School Honor Vocal Jazz Ensemble, Northgate High School Jazz Band, SFJAZZ High School All-Stars Orchestra, University of Miami Frost School of Music "Extensions", University of the Pacific Combo, United States Marine Corps All-Star Jazz Band
- Percussion Discussion with Peter Erskine and Jeff Hamilton, Conversation: A Love Supreme with Ravi Coltrane and Rudresh Mahanthappa hosted by Ashley Kahn, Conversation: Erroll Garner Jazz Project, DownBeat Blindfold Test with Pete Escovedo and Sheila E. hosted by Dan Ouellette, Remembering Clark Terry with Justin Kauflin, Film: Jaco, Film: Keep On Keepin' On

2016

- Friday, September 16, ARENA:, Jimmy Lyons Stage: Cécile McLorin Salvant; Richard Bona Mandekan Cubano, Tribute to Quincy Jones:, “The A&M Years” with Quincy Jones as honored guest (Christian McBride, Musical Director, John Clayton, Conductor, with special guests James Carter, Dave Grusin, Paul Jackson, Jr., Sean Jones, Hubert Laws, Gregoire Maret, Valerie Simpson & the Monterey Jazz Festival Orchestra, GROUNDS:, Garden Stage: Mixcla +1 from Berklee College of Music; Alfredo Rodriguez Quartet; Bria Skonberg, Dizzy's Den: Still Dreaming: Joshua Redman, Ron Miles, Scott Colley, Brian Blade; Cécile McLorin Salvant, Night Club: Jamison Ross; Toshiko Akiyoshi Trio; Troker, Coffee House Gallery: Sullivan Fortner Trio (Three sets), Courtyard Stage: James Francies on the Yamaha AvantGrand (Two sets), Jazz Theater: Simulcasts from the Arena
- Saturday, September 17, ARENA:, Jimmy Lyons Stage: Davina & The Vagabonds; Cory Henry & the Funk Apostles; Maceo Parker: Tribute to Ray Charles featuring the Ray Charles Orchestra & The Raelettes; The Bad Plus Joshua Redman; Terri Lyne Carrington's Mosaic Project featuring Lizz Wright and Valerie Simpson; Branford Marsalis Quartet featuring Kurt Elling, GROUNDS:, Garden Stage: The Guitarsonists: Chris Cain, Daniel Castro & “Mighty” Mike Schermer; Davina & The Vagabonds; Cory Henry & the Funk Apostles; Joey Alexander Trio; Tony Lindsay, Dizzy's Den: Conversation with Quincy Jones; Larry Vuckovich's Vince Guaraldi Project; Ibrahim Maalouf; Somi; Christian McBride Trio, Night Club: Wellington Secondary Combo; American Music Program Pacific Crest Jazz Orchestra; 32nd Street Brass Band; Bop of the Bay; John Patitucci's Electric Guitar Quartet; Lew Tabackin Quartet featuring Randy Brecker; Billy Hart Quartet, Coffee House Gallery: Mixcla +1, from Berklee College of Music; Conversation with Toshiko Akiyoshi & Terri Lyne Carrington; James Francies Trio: JF3; Stanley Cowell Trio (Three sets), Education Pavilion: Student Performances (All afternoon), Courtyard Stage: James Francies on the Yamaha AvantGrand (Three sets), Jazz Theater: Simulcasts from the Arena; Film: Brownie Speaks: The Life, Music & Legacy of Clifford Brown
- Sunday, September 18, ARENA:, Jimmy Lyons Stage: Next Generation Jazz Orchestra with Terri Lyne Carrington; Kamasi Washington; Gregory Porter; Wayne Shorter Quartet; Jacob Collier; Pat Metheny with Antonio Sanchez, Linda Oh & Gwilym Simcock, GROUNDS:, Dizzy's Den: Claudia Villela with Vitor Gonçalves; DownBeat Blindfold Test with Christian McBride; Banda Magda; Donny McCaslin Quartet; Bill Frisell's Guitar in the Space Age; Joshua Redman Quartet, Garden Stage: California State University, Sacramento “C-Sus Voices”; University of Miami Frost Concert Band; Montclair Women's Big Band; Tommy Igoe's Groove Conspiracy; Elena Pinderhughes; KING, Night Club: MJF High School Honor Vocal Jazz Ensemble; Valencia High School “Two N’ Four”; LA County High School for the Arts Vocal Jazz Ensemble; Las Vegas Academy Big Band; Folsom High School Big Band; Northgate High school Big Band; MJF High School All-Star Big Band; Ronnie Foster Trio; Dave Stryker Quartet featuring Eric Alexander and Jared Gold on organ; Dr. Lonnie Smith, Coffee House Gallery: Conversation with Donny McCaslin; SFJAZZ High School All-Stars Combo; University of Miami Dafnis Prieto Artist Ensemble; Kris Davis Trio (Two sets), Jazz Education Pavilion: Student Bands (All afternoon), Courtyard Stage: James Francies on the Yamaha AvantGrand (Four sets), Jazz Theater: Simulcasts from the Arena; Film: Thomas Chapin, Night Bird Song: The Incandescent Life of a Jazz Great

2017

- Friday, Sept. 15, Jimmy Lyons Stage (arena): Regina Carter “Dear Ella”; A Tribute to Dizzy Gillespie: Kenny Barron Trio with special guests Roy Hargrove, Sean Jones, Pedrito Martinez; Herbie Hancock, Garden Stage: Ray Obiedo & The Latin Jazz Project; Along Came Betty; Danae Greenfield Quartet from Berklee College of Music, Dizzy's Den: GoGo Penguin, Miles Mosley Night Club: Matt Wilson's Honey & Salt; Alicia Olatuja; Gerald Clayton Trio, Coffee House Gallery: Latin Jazz Collective; Roberta Gambarini, Courtyard Stage: Music on the Yamaha AvantGrand(Two sets), Jazz Theater: Simulcasts from the arena
- Saturday, Sept. 16, Jimmy Lyons Stage (arena): Monsieur Periné; Mr. Sipp; Dee Dee Bridgewater; Clayton-Hamilton Jazz Orchestra (MJF Commission); Leslie Odom, Jr.; A Tribute to Sonny Rollins featuring Jimmy Heath, Joe Lovano, Branford Marsalis, Joshua Redman and Gerald Clayton, Scott Colley & Lewis Nash, Garden Stage: Con Brio; The Suffers; Mr. Sipp; Monsieur Periné; Sammy Miller Congregation Dizzy's Den: Ali Ryerson Quartet; Sean Jones Quartet; Kyle Eastwood Band; Roy Hargrove Quintet; Pedrito Martinez Group; Clayton-Hamilton Jazz Orchestra, Night Club: Top bands from the 2017 Next Generation Jazz Festival; Roger Fox Big Band; Kandace Springs; Regina Carter Quartet; Derrick Hodge & Mike Mitchell Coffee House Gallery: DownBeat Blindfold Test; Conversation with Herbie Hancock; Danae Greenfield Quartet from Berklee College of Music; Joanne Brackeen Trio (Three sets), Education Pavilion: Student Performances (All afternoon), Courtyard Stage: Music on the Yamaha AvantGrand (Three sets), Jazz Theater: Simulcasts from the Arena; Jazz on Film
- Sunday, Sept. 17, Jimmy Lyons Stage (arena): Next Generation Jazz Orchestra with John Clayton, Jeff Hamilton and Gerald Clayton; John Beasley's MONK’estra; Common; Chris Thile & Brad Mehldau; Angélique Kidjo's Celia Cruz Tribute with Pedrito Martinez; Herbie Hancock & Chick Corea, Dizzy's Den: Andy Weis & the Monterey Jazz All-Stars; O.F.N.I. Trio; Joe Lovano Classic Quartet; Tia Fuller Quintet featuring Ingrid Jensen; Regina Carter & Southern Comfort; Vijay Iyer Sextet, Garden Stage: Top Bands from the 2017 Next Generation Jazz Festival; Roger Fox Big Band with Chris Cain; Ranky Tanky; Sandy Cressman and Homenagem Brasileira, Night Club: Top Bands from the 2017 Next Generation Jazz Festival; MJF High School Honor Vocal Jazz Ensemble; MJF High School All-Star Big Band; Amendola Vs. Blades; Chester Thompson Trio; James Carter Organ Trio, Coffee House Gallery: Conversations with Jimmy Heath and Chick Corea; Top bands from the 2017 Next Generation Jazz Festival; Chano Dominguez Trio (Two sets, Jazz Education Pavilion: Student Bands (All afternoon), Courtyard Stage: Music on the Yamaha AvantGrand (Four sets), Jazz Theater: Simulcasts from the Arena; Jazz on Film

2018

- Friday, September 21, ARENA:, Jimmy Lyons Stage: Tribute to Geri Allen with Tia Fuller, Ingrid Jensen, Terri Lyne Carrington, Kris Davis, Shamie Royston, Maurice Chestnut, DJ Val, and Robert Hurst; Dianne Reeves; Jazz at Lincoln Center Orchestra with Wynton Marsalis present Spaces with “Lil Buck” and Jared Grimes, GROUNDS:, Garden Stage: Hristo Vitchev; Tammy L. Hall Peace-tet; Berklee College of Music, Dizzy's Den: Jane Bunnett & Maqueque; Christian McBride Trio, Night Club: Adam Rogers & Dice; Knower; Cameron Graves, Pacific Jazz Café: Lisa Mezzacappa AvantNOIR; Jane Ira Bloom; Thumbscrew, Courtyard Stage: Addison Frei on the Yamaha AvantGrand (Two sets), North Coast Brewing Co. Education Stage: student performances (All evening), Jazz Theater: Simulcasts from the arena, Pacific Jazz Café Exhibit: The Color of Jazz: Album cover photographs by Pete Turner (all weekend)
- Saturday, September 22, ARENA:, Jimmy Lyons Stage: Thornetta Davis; Lean on Me: José James Celebrates Bill Withers; Oscar Hernández & the Spanish Harlem Orchestra (MJF Commission); Monterey Jazz Festival on Tour with Cécile McLorin Salvant, Bria Skonberg, Melissa Aldana, Christian Sands, Yasushi Nakamura, Jamison Ross; Remembering Ray Brown featuring Christian McBride, Benny Green, Greg Hutchinson with special guests John Clayton, John Patitucci and Dianne Reeves; Jon Batiste with the Dap-Kings, GROUNDS:, Garden Stage: No BS! Brass Band; Thornetta Davis; José James Celebrates Bill Withers; No BS! Brass Band; Harold Lopez-Nussa Trio, Dizzy's Den: Kristen Strom; Akili & Ayana Bradley Quintet; Jamie Baum Septet+; Dave Grusin; Tia Fuller Quartet; Donny McCaslin Group, Night Club: Top bands from the 2018 Next Generation Jazz Festival; 32nd Street Brass Band; John Santos Unusual Standards; Ingrid & Christine Jensen Infinitude; The Baylor Project; Mwenso & the Shakes, Pacific Jazz Café: Conversations with Dave Grusin and Dianne Reeves; Top bands from the 2018 Next Generation Jazz Festival; Fred Hersch (solo); Fred Hersch and Jane Ira Bloom; Fred Hersch Trio, Courtyard Stage: Addison Frei on the Yamaha AvantGrand (Three sets), North Coast Brewing Co. Education Stage: Student Performances (All afternoon), Jazz Theater: Simulcasts from the Arena; Jazz on Film: Dave Grusin: Not Enough Time
- Sunday, September 23, ARENA:, Jimmy Lyons Stage: Next Generation Jazz Orchestra with Tia Fuller & Ingrid Jensen; Bokanté; Charles Lloyd & the Marvels with Lucinda Williams; Anat Cohen Tentet; Celebrating Michael Brecker with Randy Brecker, Donny McCaslin, Gil Goldstein, Adam Rogers, John Patitucci, and Antonio Sanchez; Norah Jones with Brian Blade & Chris Thomas, GROUNDS:, Garden Stage: Top bands from the 2018 Next Generation Jazz Festival; Gabriel Royal; Katie Thiroux Trio; Ladama, Dizzy's Den: Aya Takazawa Quintet; Gary Meek Quartet; Veronica Swift; Wadada Leo Smith; Dianne Reeves with Romero Lubambo; Monterey Jazz Festival on Tour with Cécile McLorin Salvant, Bria Skonberg, Melissa Aldana, Christian Sands, Yasushi Nakamura, Jamison Ross, Night Club: Top bands from the 2018 Next Generation Jazz Festival; MJF High School Honor Vocal Jazz Ensemble; MJF High School All-Star Big Band; Bobby Floyd Trio; Delvon Lamarr Organ Trio; Joey DeFrancesco & the People, Pacific Jazz Café: DownBeat Blindfold Test with John Clayton; Conversation about Michael Brecker; Top bands from the 2018 Next Generation Jazz Festival; Julian Lage Trio; Bill Frisell Trio, North Coast Brewing Co. Education Stage: Student Bands (all afternoon), Courtyard Stage: Addison Frei on the Yamaha AvantGrand (four sets), Jazz Theater: Simulcasts from the Arena; Jazz on Film: Two Trains Runnin’

2019

- Friday, September 27, ARENA: Jimmy Lyons Stage: Allison Miller & Derrick Hodge Present Soul on Soul: A Tribute to Mary Lou Williams; Kenny Barron & Dave Holland Trio; Diana Krall, GROUNDS: Garden Stage: Allison Au Quartet; SambaDá; Gerald Clayton Quartet; Berklee Global Jazz Institute, Dizzy's Den: Chris Potter Circuits Trio with James Francies & Eric Harland; Christian McBride Situation with Patrice Rushen, Night Club: Connie Han Trio; Bria Skonberg; Donna Grantis, Pacific Jazz Café: MJF 101 with Andrew Gilbert & Pamela Espeland; DJ Brother Mister; Taylor McFerrin, Courtyard Stage: Music on the Yamaha AvantGrand (Three sets), North Coast Brewing Co. Education Stage: Student performances (All evening), Blue Note at Sea Tent: Events TBA, Jazz Theater: Simulcasts from the Arena, Pacific Jazz Café Exhibit: Blue Note Records at 80: Perspectives (All weekend)
- Saturday, September 28, ARENA: Jimmy Lyons Stage: Larkin Poe; Cha Wa; Tank and the Bangas; Christian McBride Big Band; Eliane Elias; Chris Botti, GROUNDS: Garden Stage: Christone “Kingfish” Ingram; Larkin Poe; Cha Wa; Huntertones; Steve Bernstein's MTO West, Dizzy's Den: Natalie Cressman & Ian Farquini; Pamela Rose & Terrence Brewer; Derrick Hodge presents Color of Noize; Derrick Hodge Band; Kenny Barron & Dave Holland Duo; Christian McBride Big Band, Night Club: Hamilton High School Jazz Ensemble A; Tucson Jazz Institute Concord Combo; SFJAZZ High School All-Stars Orchestra; the Commanders Jazz Ensemble; Luciana Souza; Allison Miller's Boom Tic Boom; Michael Mayo; Yellowjackets with special guest Luciana Souza, Pacific Jazz Café: Zion Dyson; Columbia University Jazz Combo; Conversation with Kenny Barron & Dave Holland, hosted by Willard Jenkins; Berklee Global Jazz Institute; Ben Flocks and Mask of the Muse; Sasha Berliner; Roberta Gambarini, Courtyard Stage: Music on the Yamaha AvantGrand (Three sets), North Coast Brewing Co. Education Stage: Student performances (All day), Blue Note at Sea Tent: Events TBA, Jazz Theater: Simulcasts from the Arena; Jazz on Film: Blue Note Records: Beyond the Notes
- Sunday, September 29, ARENA: Jimmy Lyons Stage Next Generation Jazz Orchestra with Allison Miller & Derrick Hodge; Pacific Mambo Orchestra; Candy Dulfer; Jazzmeia Horn; Double Vision Revisited featuring Bob James, David Sanborn & Marcus Miller with guests Billy Kilson & Larry Braggs; Snarky Puppy, GROUNDS: Garden Stage: California State University, Long Beach Pacific Standard Time; Centro Cultural Costarricense Norteamericano Jazz Orchestra; Electric Squeezebox Orchestra; Barrio Barouche; Leyla McCalla; Ambrose Akinmusire, Dizzy's Den: Kenny Stahl Group; Abe Rábane Trio; Jenny Scheinman & Allison Miller's Parlour Game; Antonio Sánchez & Migration; Jazzmeia Horn, Night Club: MJF High School Honor Vocal Ensemble; Folsom High School Jazz Choir I; Valencia High School Two N’ Four; Northgate High School Jazz Band I; Rio Americano High School AM Jazz Ensemble; Downey High School Jazz Band I; MJF Monterey County High School All-Star Band; Amina Claudine Myers; Doug Carn West Coast Organ Group; Mike LeDonne's Groover Quartet, Pacific Jazz Café: DownBeat Blindfold Test with Antonio Sánchez, hosted by Dan Ouellette; The Life & Legacy of Dexter Gordon with Maxine Gordon, hosted by Angela Davis; Marcus Shelby Quintet; Tammy L. Hall & Ruth Davies, North Coast Brewing Co. Education Stage: Student performances (All day), Blue Note at Sea Tent: Events TBA, Courtyard Stage: Music on the Yamaha AvantGrand (Four sets), Jazz Theater: Simulcasts from the Arena

2020 None.

2023

Herbie Hancock, Charles Lloyd, John Handy, Terrence Blanchard, Christian McBride, John Scofield, Thundercat, Snarky Puppy, Kendrick Scott, Chris Potter, Reuben Rogers, Terri Lyne Carrington, Marcus Strickland, Ben Wendel, Lakecia Benjamin, Turtle Island Quartet, Oscar Seaton Jr., Lionel Loueke, Jaylen Petinaud, Diane Reeves, Billy Childs, Sean Jones, Gerald Clayton, John Clayton, Jeff Hamilton, Louis Cato, Charles Haynes, Justin Brown, Marcus Gilmore, Ambrose Akinmusire, Donny McCaslin, Gretchen Parlato, Kait Dunton, Scary Goldings, Chris Cain, Sullivan Fortner, Jeremy Pelt, Lew Tabackin, Peter Washington, Connie Han, Bill Wysaske, Isaiah Sharkey, Oumou Sangaré, Jamie Cullum, Samara Joy, Evan Sherman, Benny Green, Yasushi Nakamura, Clarence Penn, Ben Flocks, Azar Lawrence, Josh Evans, James Francies, Taylor Eigisti

2024

Stanley Clarke, Robert Glasper, Joshua Redman, Mavis Staples, Keyon Harrold, Chris Potter, Kendrick Scott, Matt Brewer, Mumu Fresh, Chief Adjuah, Jose James, Gerald Clayton, Samara Joy, Don Was, Blind Boys of Alabama, Herlin Riley, Jason Marsalis, Bobby Rush, Gabrielle Cavassa, Phillip Norris, Cory Henry, Somi, Jason Moran, Nasheet Waits, Marcus Gilmore, Elé Howell, Ryoma Takenaga, Joel Ross, Marquis Hill, Orrin Evans, Brandee Younger, Nazir Ebo, Paul Cornish

== Sources ==
- Minor, William. Monterey Jazz Festival: Forty Legendary Years (October 1997), Angel City Press - ISBN 1-883318-40-8
- Zimmerman, Keith and Kent. The Art of Jazz: Monterey Jazz Festival/50 Years (July 2007), Angel City Press - ISBN 0-9794037-0-7
