= Mythos (musical project) =

Canadian music project

Mythos is a Canadian new age musical project started by Bob D'Eith and Paul Schmidt in 1996. Bob (piano) and Paul (guitar) collectively wrote, produced, and performed on the albums with the help of various session performers. The centerpiece of the Mythos sound rests on the acoustic guitar and piano, which are accented by guest vocalists. Synthesizers and performances in various other musical styles are regularly incorporated into the music.

== History ==
Robert (Bob) D'Eith attended the University of Victoria in the 1980s, receiving both a Bachelor of Arts (BA) and a Bachelor of Law (LLB) from this institution. Before creating Mythos, he played keyboards in Rock band Rymes with Orange, and contributed to the scores of a number of film and television productions. Throughout his musical career, he also maintained a private legal practice in Entertainment Law, and currently holds the titles of President for Adagio Music (Mythos' label, formerly "Spark"), and Executive Director of Music BC.

D'Eith and Schmidt formed Mythos in 1995. Mythos' initial release, Introspection, was on D'Eith's Spark Records and was confined to the Canadian market.

After Canadian success, Mythos submitted the Introspection EP to X DOT 25 Music (producers of Beyond Denial by the world fusion group; Axiom of Choice), a boutique Record Label in San Francisco Bay Area. This submission resulted in a several-albums contract deal with X DOT 25 Music, in 1996. Per X DOT 25 Music requirement for a full album, Mythos added few new songs (Angeles Weep, Paradox, The Niles and November (remix)) to the original Canadian release Introspection EP. The new full album (also called Introspection) was released by X DOT 25 Music. Shortly after the release, Introspection by Mythos (on X DOT 25 Music) went up to #2 on New Age Voice Magazine's New Age Chart, in March of 1997. A trip to MIDEM in France and a meeting with Max Ahmadi (X DOT 25 Music Executive Producer, A&R) and Jon Leon Guerrero (X DOT 25 Music, Marketing Director) was fruitful with a discussion around producing the second album. Consequently Mythos delivered the second album "Iridescence" to X DOT 25 Music. Max Ahmadi decided to work on a deal with Mr. Dan Selene (Executive Vice President, A&R) Higher Octave, a Malibu California New Age Label.

Higher Octave then released a combination (mastered and sequenced by Max Ahmadi of X DOT 25 Music) of Introspection and a follow-up unreleased EP Iridescence (1996) with the world release of Mythos (1998) through Virgin/EMI. Higher Octave wanted to have X DOT 25 Music creativity engaged in the release and commissioned X DOT 25 Music to create the cover concept. Max Ahmadi suggested using Mr. Gil Bruvel's painting for the cover and inside pages of the CD. So 4 of Gil's paintings were licensed by Higher Octave and used in the CD package.

The "Mythos" release was commercially successful, peaking at 18 on the Billboard Top New Age Albums chart. Mythos became a big seller for Higher Octave who went on to release the follow-up albums Reality of a Dreamer (2000) and Eternity (2002), both of which placed on the Billboard chart. Sales would surpass 100,000 and Mythos stayed on Billboard New Age charts for many months. All Mythos albums' artworks were licensed from Gil Bruvel. Mythos subsequently released the album Purity (2006) with Pacific Music/Warner in Canada and Allegro/Alula records in the USA. Since that time, the pair have continued to write, but with Paul Schmidt living in Korea, recording has been a challenge.

In 2010, Mythos released Rain, a remixed version of "Wind" (from Introspection), in celebration of the group's 15 year anniversary. After a six-year hiatus, Mythos released an album entitled "Journey" in April 2013 on Adagio Music/The Orchard, followed in 2015 with a special 20th Anniversary Vinyl "Best of Mythos" collection. and an EP entitled Eros on August 3, 2018. In 2021, Mythos released a 25th Anniversary Album XXV featuring 5 new tracks and 9 fully remastered classics and an EP entitled Redux in 2022.

== Musical style ==
Critics have described Mythos as New Age, Ambient, Ethereal, and Film-Oriented, with influences from Jazz, Classical, Gospel-Soul, and various World styles. Many of their songs include vocalize performances, but few have lyrics. The music is multi-layered, incorporating synthesizers and a numerous acoustic instruments. Multiple guest artists and/or session musicians have contributed to each of Mythos' studio releases, most prominently husband and wife pair Rene Worst (bass) and Jennifer Scott (vocals).

== Awards and nominations ==
Mythos was nominated for Juno Instrumental Artist of the Year award in 1998. Bob D'Eith was nominated for the Canadian Music Awards' Best Keyboardist of the Year in 1995. Individual albums have won and been nominated for various awards, as described in the Discography.

== Discography ==
=== Introspection ===
Introspection

Studio album by Mythos
- Released: 1996
- Genre: New Age
- Label: Spark Records

Mythos chronology
Introspection	Angels Weep

Professional ratings
Review scores
Source	Rating
Drop-D Magazine	(favorable)

==== Track listing Original Canadian Release ====
1. "Wind" - 4:00
2. "Cathedral" - 4:32
3. "November" - 4:58
4. "Premonition" - 4:09
5. "Sirens" - 3:29
6. "Clockwork" - 4:45
7. "Prelude" - 2:36
8. "Introspection" - 4:01

==== Awards ====
Winner West Coast Music Award Best Dance Album

==== Performance Credits ====
- Bob D'Eith: Piano, Keyboards
- Paul Schmidt: Guitar
- Christine Duncan: Vocals
- Jennifer Scott: Vocals
- Rene Worst: Bass

=== Introspection ===
Introspection

Studio album by Mythos
- Released: 1996
- Genre: New Age
- Label: X DOT 25 Music

Mythos chronology
Introspection	Angels Weep

Professional ratings
Review scores
Source	Rating
Drop-D Magazine	(favorable)

==== Track listing American Release ====
1. "Wind" - 4:00
2. "November" - 4:58
3. "Angels Weep" - 8:33
4. "Paradox" - 4:42
5. "Premonition" - 4:09
6. "Cathedral" - 4:32
7. "The Nile" - 4:01
8. "Clockwork" - 4:45
9. "Sirens" - 3:29
10. "Prelude" - 2:36
11. "Introspection" - 4:01
12. "November [Remix]" - 5:32

==== Charting ====
Year	Chart	Peak position
1997	New Age Voice - New Age Chart	2

==== Performance Credits ====
- Bob D'Eith: Piano, Keyboards
- Paul Schmidt: Guitar
- Christine Duncan: Vocals
- Jennifer Scott: Vocals
- Rene Worst: Bass

=== Angels Weep ===
Angels Weep

EP by Mythos
- Released: 1996
- Recorded: Camelot Studios, North Vancouver, BC, Canada
- Genre: New Age
- Length: 18:18
- Label: Spark Records
- Producer: Bob D'Eith

Mythos chronology
Introspection	Angels Weep	Iridescence

==== Track listing ====
1. "Angels Weep (Radio Edit)" - 3:42
2. "Angels Dance (Remix)" - 3:33
3. "November (Radio Edit)" - 3:15
4. "November Dance (Remix Edit)" - 3:26
5. "The Nile (Bonus Track)" - 4:00

=== Iridescence ===
Iridescence

Studio album by Mythos
- Released: 1997
- Genre: New Age
- Length: 48:10
- Label: Spark Records

Mythos chronology
Angels Weep	Iridescence	Mythos

==== Track listing ====
1. "Loneliness" - 3:38
2. "Sunless Sea" - 4:01
3. "Iridescence" - 4:15
4. "Planinata" - 3:28
5. "Brazil" - 4:15
6. "La Cathedral" - 1:59
7. "Sacred River" - 3:05
8. "Evolution" - 5:08
9. "June" - 5:07
10. "Motif" - 2:47
11. "Danse Plantania" - 3:31
12. "Sacred River [Remix]" - 3:01
13. "Angels Dance" - 3:32

==== Performance Credits ====
- Bob D'Eith: Piano, Keyboards
- Paul Schmidt: Guitar
- Annette Ducharme: Vocals
- Christine Duncan: Vocals
- Niko Quintal: Percussion
- Jennifer Scott: Vocals
- Rene Worst: Bass

=== Mythos ===
Mythos

Compilation album by Mythos
- Released: October 20, 1998
- Recorded: Camelot Studios, North Vancouver, BC, Canada
- Genre: New Age
- Length: 1:03:44
- Label: Higher Octave
- Producer: Bob D'Eith

Mythos chronology
Iridescence	Mythos	Reality of a Dreamer

Professional ratings
Review scores
Source	Rating
After Enigma	(favorable)
Allmusic	2.5/5 stars
Musical Discoveries	(favorable)

==== Background ====
This is Mythos' debut on the Higher Octave label, consisting mostly of previously released material. The liner notes claim this release includes "the best of the previously released album Introspection plus seven new tracks," but a number of the remaining songs were included on Iridescence. The track name "The Odyssey" does not seem to have appeared prior to this eponymous album, but it actually is the track "Catheral" on Introspection.

==== Track listing ====
1. "Brazil" - 4:17
2. "June" - 5:01
3. "Sunless Sea" - 3:59
4. "November" - 4:57
5. "Planinata" - 3:26
6. "La Cathedral" - 2:03
7. "The Odyssey" - 4:31
8. "Angels Weep" - 5:36
9. "The Nile" - 4:02
10. "Motif" - 2:49
11. "Sirens" - 3:31
12. "Prelude" - 2:36
13. "Introspection" - 4:01
14. "Evolution" - 5:11
15. "Premonition" - 2:58
16. "Paradox" - 4:46

==== Charting ====
Year	Chart	Peak position
1999	Billboard Top New Age Albums	18

=== The Reality of a Dreamer ===
The Reality of a Dreamer

Studio album by Mythos
- Released: April 25, 2000
- Recorded: Camelot Studios, North Vancouver, BC, Canada
- Genre: New Age
- Length: 43:41
- Label: Higher Octave
- Producer: Bob D'Eith

Mythos chronology
Mythos	The Reality of a Dreamer	Eternity

Professional ratings
Review scores
Source	Rating
After Enigma	(neutral)
Allmusic	4/5 stars
Musical Discoveries	(favorable)

==== Track listing ====
1. "Alchemy" - 4:38
2. "Kaleidoscope" - 3:30
3. "Venice" - 4:28
4. "Vision I" - 3:22
5. "Requiem" - 4:37
6. "Solstice" - 4:06
7. "Fantasy" - 3:24
8. "Destiny" - 3:42
9. "Reveries" - 1:28
10. "The Ring" - 3:24
11. "Redemption" - 3:33
12. "Vision II" - 3:24

==== Awards ====
Nominated for the West Coast Music Award Best Electronic (Techno, House) Release

==== Charting ====
Year	Chart	Peak position
2000	Billboard Top New Age Albums	6

=== Eternity ===
Eternity

Studio album by Mythos
- Released: August 27, 2002
- Recorded: Bakerstreet Studios, North Vancouver, BC, Canada
- Genre: New Age
- Label: Higher Octave
- Producer: Bob D'Eith, Paul Schmidt

Mythos chronology
Reality of a Dreamer	Eternity	Purity

Professional ratings
Review scores
Source	Rating
After Enigma	(unfavorable)
Allmusic	4/5 stars
Earth Rhythms	4.5/5 stars

==== Track listing ====
1. "Ascent" - 3:39
2. "Unity" - 4:21
3. "Del Mar" - 3:42
4. "Turn to Grey" - 3:56
5. "Alpha" - 2:48
6. "Exodus" - 4:39
7. "Leyenda" - 1:51
8. "Kyrie" - 4:35
9. "Dreams of Jade" - 5:28
10. "Paradise" - 3:46
11. "Orca" - 5:48
12. "Sixth Sense" - 2:35
13. "Freedom" - 4:02

==== Awards ====
This album won Western Canadian Music Award for "Best Instrumental Album" in 2003

==== Charting ====
Year	Chart	Peak position
2002	Billboard Top New Age Albums	14

=== Purity ===
Purity

Studio album by Mythos
- Released: November 14, 2006
- Recorded: Camelot Studios, Maple Ridge, BC and MX Solutions, Vancouver, BC, Canada
- Genre: New Age
- Label: Pacific Music
- Producer: Bob D'Eith

Mythos chronology
Eternity	Purity

Professional ratings
Review scores
Source	Rating
After Enigma	(favorable)

==== Track listing ====
1. "Purity" - 4:34
2. "Surrender" - 5:51
3. "Alten Mara" - 3:18
4. "Andalucia" - 4:03
5. "Icarus" - 4:38
6. "Adagio" - 2:35
7. "Mizo's Gift" - 5:13
8. "Deus Ex Machina" - 5:46
9. "Dream" - 4:53
10. "Mystique" - 3:51
11. "Triste" - 5:23

==== Performance Credits ====
- Bob D'Eith: Piano and Keyboards
- Paul Schmidt: Acoustic Guitar
- Jennifer Scott: Vocals
- Rene Worst: Bass
- Pepe Danza: Additional Percussion, Ethnic Flutes, and Stringed Instruments
- Cameron Wilson: Violin
- Finn Maniche: Cello

=== Singles ===
- "November Dance"
- "Danse Planinata"
- "Kaleidoscope"
- "Angels Dance"
- "Ascent"
- "Rain"

=== Journey ===
Journey

Studio album by Mythos
- Released: April 30, 2013
- Recorded: Camelot Studios, Maple Ridge, BC
- Genre: New Age, Electronic, Ambient
- Label: Adagio Music Inc.
- Producer: Bob D'Eith

Mythos chronology
Purity	Journey

Professional ratings
Review scores
Source	Rating
After Enigma	(favorable)

==== Track listing ====
1. "Journey" - 4:38
2. "Spiritus" - 4:47
3. "Escape Velocity" - 5:46
4. "Tokyo" - 5:12
5. "Inner Peace" - 3:01
6. "April" - 2:43
7. "Novaya Zemlya" - 4:02
8. "Nepal" - 3:40
9. "Duet" - 4:34
10. "Nocturnal" - 1:38
11. "Impressionism" - 3:48

==== Performance Credits ====
- Bob D'Eith: Piano and Keyboards
- Paul Schmidt: Acoustic Guitar
- Jasmin Parkin: Vocals

=== Eros ===
Eros

Studio album by Mythos
- Released: August 3, 2018
- Recorded: Adagio Studios, Maple Ridge, BC
- Genre: New Age, Electronic, Ambient
- Label: Adagio Music Inc. (the Orchard)
- Producer: Bob D'Eith

Mythos chronology
Journey	Eros

Professional ratings
Review scores
Source	Rating
After Enigma	(favorable)

==== Track listing ====
1. "Kawakari" - 4:30
2. "Eros" - 4:49
3. "Catana" - 4:17
4. "Allure" - 4:35
5. "Song from a Sad Dream" - 3:36

==== Performance Credits ====
- Bob D'Eith: Piano and Keyboards
- Paul Schmidt: Acoustic Guitar
- Jennifer Scott: Vocals
- Rene Worst: Bass

=== XXV ===
XXV

Studio album by Mythos
- Released: 2021
- Recorded: Adagio Studios, Maple Ridge, BC
- Genre: New Age, Electronic, Ambient
- Label: Adagio Music Inc. (the Orchard)
- Producer: Bob D'Eith

Mythos chronology
Eros	XXV

Professional ratings
Review scores
Source	Rating
After Enigma	(favorable)

==== Track listing ====
1. "Legacy (feat. Cam Blake)" - 5:02
2. "Fly Away" - 4:39
3. "Bonum et Malum" - 4:10
4. "Progression" - 4:52
5. "Recuerdos de la Alahambra" - 2:44
6. "November Dance (2021 Remastered Version)" - 3:28
7. "Brazil (2021 Remastered Version)" - 4:17
8. "Planinata (2021 Remastered Version)" - 3:26
9. "Alchemy (2021 Remastered Version)" - 4:39
10. "Ascent (2021 Remastered Version)." - 3:40
11. "Icarus (2021 Remastered Version)" - 4:40
12. "Surrender (2021 Remastered Version)" - 5:51
13. "Eros (2021 Remastered Version)" - 4:48
14. "Spiritus (2021 Remastered Version)" - 4:47

==== Performance Credits ====
- Bob D'Eith: Piano and Keyboards
- Paul Schmidt: Acoustic Guitar
- Jennifer Scott: Vocals
- Rene Worst: Bass

== See also ==
- List of ambient music artists
