= Monterey Festival =

Monterey Festival may refer to:

- Monterey Jazz Festival, an annual jazz festival in Monterey, California
- Monterey International Pop Festival, a 1967 music festival in Monterey
- Monterey Festival of Speed, a motorsport event in Monterey; see WeatherTech Raceway Laguna Seca
