= Electric Avenue (disambiguation) =

Electric Avenue is a 1982 song by Eddy Grant.

Electric Avenue may also refer to:

== Streets ==
=== United Kingdom ===
- Electric Avenue, Brixton, a street in South London

== Entertainment ==
- Electric Avenue (band), an American music band known for their performances of 1980s pop hits
- Electric Avenue (TV series), a 1988 BBC series on the application of computers to everyday life
- Electric Avenue (festival), a music festival held in Hagley Park, Christchurch, New Zealand
- A radio program hosted by Richard Z. Sirois in Quebec and Ontario, Canada

== Other uses ==
- Electric Avenue (Portland), a joint research and development initiative in Portland, Oregon
- Electric Avenue, the household electronics and appliances department of the now defunct Montgomery Ward department store chain
