= Fred Sturm =

American composer

Frederick I. Sturm (March 21, 1951 – August 24, 2014) was an American jazz composer, arranger and teacher.

== Biography ==
Sturm studied at Lawrence University, the University of North Texas College of Music, and the Eastman School of Music. He played trombone and performed with the jazz nonet Matrix from 1974 to 1977. While studying at UNT in the 1970s, Sturm was a member of the One O'Clock Lab Band.

He served as Director of Jazz Studies at Lawrence University from 1977 to 1991, then joined the Eastman School of Music faculty as professor of jazz composition/arranging, conductor of the Eastman Jazz Ensemble and Studio Orchestra, and chair of the Eastman Jazz Studies and Contemporary Media Department. In 2002, he returned home to Wisconsin to direct the Lawrence University Jazz and Improvisational Music Department and hold the Kimberly-Clark Endowed Professorship in Music.

Sturm conducted the HR (Hessischer Rundfunk) Big Band in Frankfurt; the NDR (Norddeutscher Rundfunk) Big Band in Hamburg; the Bohuslän Big Band in Gothenburg, Sweden; the Klüvers Big Band in Aarhus, Denmark; the Arendal Big Band in Arendal, Norway; and collegiate and state honors high school jazz ensembles in the U.S. He served as a visiting professor at Det Jyske Musikkonservatorium (Royal Conservatory) in Denmark and the Associazone Italian Gordon per l'Apprendimento Musicale in Rome. Down Beat magazine has cited his university jazz ensembles with 9 Student Music Awards. He was a co-owner of Tritone Jazz Fantasy Camps.

Abstract Image won the 2003 ASCAP/IAJE Commission in Honor of Quincy Jones. He is the Artistic Director, composer, and arranger for the Baseball Music Project, a concert program collaboration with the Baseball Hall of Fame that has been performed by the Boston Pops and symphony orchestras in Chicago, Seattle, Houston, Miami, Detroit, Indianapolis, Phoenix, and San Diego.

Sturm's Migrations contained indigenous music from 22 countries and was premiered by vocalist Bobby McFerrin and the NDR Big Band in 2007. He toured Europe the following summer. He arranged and recorded two albums: Libertango: Hommage an Astor Piazzolla and Do It Again: Three Decades of Steely Dan with the HR Big Band.

== Publications ==
Sturm is the author of Changes Over Time: The Evolution of Jazz Arranging (Advance Music), Maria Schneider: Evanescence (Universal Edition), and Kenny Wheeler: Collected Works on ECM (Universal Edition). His compositions and arrangements have been published by Universal Edition, Kendor Music, Sierra Music Publications, Lorenz, Neil A. Kjos Music Company, and Alfred Music. He received commission and research grants from ASCAP, International Association for Jazz Education, NARAS, NEA, NEH, the Lila Wallace-Reader's Digest Fund, and the American Composers Forum.
