= James L. Lyons =

Founder of the Monterey Jazz Festival

James L. Lyons (November 18, 1916 – April 10, 1994) was founder of the Monterey Jazz Festival, and was its manager from 1958 until his retirement in 1992.

The first Monterey Jazz Festival took place in September 1958 at Monterey, California. Participants included performers such as Louis Armstrong and his All-Stars, Dizzy Gillespie, Ernestine Anderson accompanied by Gerald Wiggins, John Lewis, Carmen McRae, Shelly Manne, Art Farmer, Milt Jackson, Gerry Mulligan, Cal Tjader Sextet, Billie Holiday, Etta James, Harry James, Sonny Rollins, Dave Brubeck Quartet, Shelly Manne & His Men, Max Roach, Sarah Vaughan, and the Modern Jazz Quartet.

Lyons died in 1994 of a heart attack in San Luis Obispo, California.
