= Bob D'Eith =

Canadian politician (born 1964)

Bob D'Eith KC
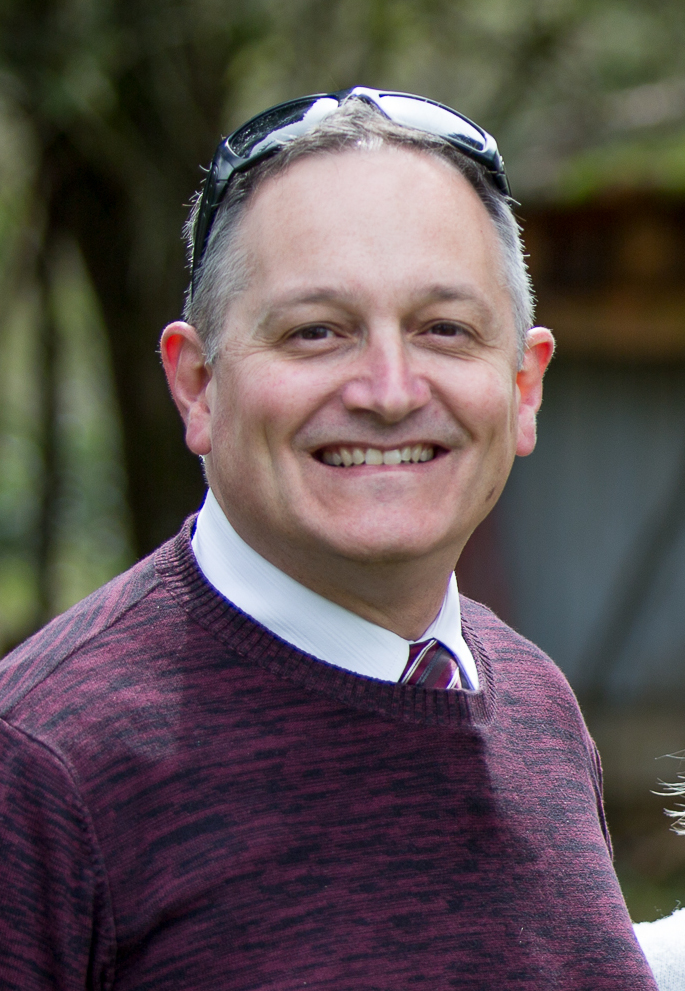

Parliamentary Secretary for Arts and Film
- In office December 7, 2022 – November 18, 2024
- Premier: David Eby
- Preceded by: Position established
- Succeeded by: Nina Krieger

Member of the British Columbia Legislative Assembly for Maple Ridge-Mission
- In office May 9, 2017 – September 21, 2024
- Preceded by: Marc Dalton
- Succeeded by: Lawrence Mok

Councilor for the City of Maple Ridge
- Incumbent
- Assumed office November 1, 2026

Personal details
- Born: September 24, 1964 (age 62) British Hong Kong
- Party: New Democratic
- Occupation: Pianist, Author, Lawyer

Robert Jan D'Eith KC (born September 24, 1964) is a Canadian politician, who was elected to the Legislative Assembly of British Columbia representing the electoral district of Maple Ridge-Mission as a member of the British Columbia New Democratic Party. He defeated two-term Liberal Party incumbent Marc Dalton during the 2017 provincial election, and served until his defeat in 2024. In 2026, he was elected as a councilor for the City of Maple Ridge. D'Eith is also a pianist, author and part-time music lawyer.

== Personal life ==
D'Eith was born September 24, 1964, in British Hong Kong. He immigrated with his father John D'Eathe and mother Vanessa Tancock (née Stelle-Perkins) to Canada in 1968 and was naturalized as a Canadian citizen in 1972. He has three siblings. D'Eith grew up in West Vancouver, British Columbia, and attended West Bay Elementary, Cypress Park Elementary, Pauline Johnson Elementary, Irwin Park Elementary, Hillside Secondary, and Carson Graham Secondary graduating in 1982. After high school, he attended the University of Victoria earning degrees in History (B.A. Hons 1986) and in Law (J.D. 1989).

D'Eith was married to Nicolette Maxwell (née Langezaal) for 11 years and had two sons and a daughter with her. He married Kim D'Eith (née Kosaba) on July 31, 2010 (at the Kosaba Lake House, Stump Lake, British Columbia) and has two step-daughters.

== Career ==
After articling at Swinton & Company and being called to the bar in 1990, D'Eith worked as in-house counsel for his father at Freehold Developments. He was project manager, building a strip mall in Calgary as part of Douglasdale Estates. After the real estate project, he started his own private practice primarily in real estate and entertainment law. At the same time, D'Eith was pursuing a career in music. In the late 1990s, he worked briefly for Sanguinetti, Braidwood Law in Squamish, British Columbia, and then as counsel at Bardel Animation. In 2001, D'Eith became the executive director of the British Columbia music association Music BC. and restricted his practice to part-time. He now practices solely as a music lawyer. He also began a label and consulting company Adagio Music. As executive director, Bob has grown Music BC to a dominant force for the music industry in British Columbia. D'Eith was the chair of the 2009 Vancouver JUNO Awards host committee and developed the very successful $5.2 million Peak Performance Project with the Pattison Broadcast Group.

On May 1, 2013, he published his first eBook entitled, A Career in Music: the other 12 step program. The book is focused on developing indie artists and new professionals in music. On February 14, 2014, D'Eith published his first novel The Displaced.

== Music career ==
D'Eith trained as a classical and jazz pianist while growing up. He played in a number of semi-professional bands until finishing law school. Once he returned to Vancouver, he joined a band called The Watchmen with lead singer Jimmy Gilmore (subsequently a member of the Silencers in Scotland) and Rob Lulic (guitar). After Jimmy left for Scotland, D'Eith, Alex Dias, and Rob Lulic continued to build on the band and this core eventually became Rymes with Orange; singers Lyndon Johnson and Nelson Sinclair joined the band. The band recorded its first album Peel (1992 mixed by Bill Buckingham) and had a number of successful radio and MuchMusic videos. After touring Canada a number of times, D'Eith was forced to choose between a career on the road or a life on the business side of music. He moved back to co-managing the band with Peter Karroll and became a non-touring member of the band. The band added Steve Hennessy and Niko Quintal and recorded their second album Trapped in a Machine (1994 - produced by John Webster and recorded at Turtle Recording in Richmond, British Columbia). This record resulted in a number of Top 30 radio hits including "Toy Train" which was undoubtedly the band's biggest hit. The song was featured in the Labatt's commercial Genuine Kelly. During this period, D'Eith was honoured with a Best keyboardist nomination at Canadian Music Week and the band was nominated for a Juno Award for Best New Artist.

After a split from Rymes with Orange, D'Eith decided to re-focus his music creation. After years of urging from his father, he teamed up with his brother Paul's best friend from school Paul Schmidt. Schmidt is a classically trained guitar player. The idea was to create music which was not meant for commercial radio. It was originally an attempt to write music which would be suitable for film and television and showcase D'Eith and Schmidt's composing ability. The project took on a life of its own and the group Mythos was born. The first release was an EP called Introspection (1995). The music can be described as ambient, instrumental music featuring beats, piano, guitar, vocalese, and various other organic and synthetic elements. It is a mixture of world, electronic, dance, classical, and jazz. Generally Mythos does not use lyrics. The remix of the piece "November" became commercially successful on radio. This led to an increase CD sales and eventually awards with a Western Canadian Music Awards (WCMA) (best dance) and a Juno Award nomination (best instrumental).

After Canadian success, Mythos submitted the Introspection EP to X DOT 25 Music, a boutique Record Label in San Francisco Bay Area. This submission resulted in a several-albums contract deal with X DOT 25 Music, in 1996. The new album (also called Introspection) was released by X DOT 25 Music which went up to #2 on New Age Voice Magazine's New Age Chart, in March 1997. Mythos delivered the second album "Iridescence" to X DOT 25 Music. Max Ahmadi (Executive Producer & A/R) decided to work on a deal with Higher Octave, a Malibu California New Age Label. Higher Octave then released a combination of Introspection and a follow-up unreleased EP Iridescence (1996) with the world release of Mythos (1998) through Virgin/EMI. Max Ahmadi decided on using Mr. Gil Bruvel's painting for the cover and inside pages of the CD.

Mythos became a big seller for Higher Octave who went on to release the follow-up albums Reality of a Dreamer (2000) and Eternity (2002). Sales would surpass 100,000 and Mythos stayed on Billboard New Age charts for many months. Mythos subsequently released the album Purity (2006) with Pacific Music/Warner in Canada and Allegro/Alula records in the USA. Since that time, the pair have continued to write, but with Paul Schmidt living in Korea, recording has been a challenge.

After a six-year hiatus, Mythos released an album entitled Journey in April 2013, an EP entitled Eros in 2018, a Vinyl record The Best of Mythos - 25th Anniversary in 2020, an Album entitled XXV in 2021 and an EP entitled Redux in 2022.

== Electoral record ==
=== Provincial ===
2024 British Columbia general election: Maple Ridge East
Party	Candidate	Votes	%	±%	Expenditures
Conservative	Lawrence Mok	12,058	47.02	–	$13,720.30
New Democratic	Bob D'Eith	11,961	46.64	-7.9	$46,506.63
Green	Kylee Williams	1,626	6.34	-3.8	$0.00
Total valid votes/expense limit		25,645	99.81	–	$71,700.08
Total rejected ballots		49	0.19	–	
Turnout		25,694	57.95	–	
Registered voters		44,335			
Conservative notional gain from New Democratic		Swing		+27.4	
Source: Elections BC

2020 British Columbia general election: Maple Ridge-Mission
Party	Candidate	Votes	%	±%	Expenditures
New Democratic	Bob D'Eith	14,721	55.15	+13.21	$44,290.44
Liberal	Chelsa Meadus	9,009	33.75	−6.92	$50,223.21
Green	Matt Trenholm	2,962	11.10	−2.12	$0.00
Total valid votes		26,692	100.00	–	
Total rejected ballots					
Turnout					
Registered voters					
Source: Elections BC

2017 British Columbia general election: Maple Ridge-Mission
Party	Candidate	Votes	%	±%	Expenditures
New Democratic	Bob D'Eith	10,989	41.94	+2.13	$68,144
Liberal	Marc Dalton	10,664	40.70	−5.89	$59,214
Green	Peter Pak Chiu Tam	3,464	13.22	+5.01	$9,786
Conservative	Trevor Hamilton	935	3.57	−1.80	
Libertarian	Jeff Monds	148	0.57	–	
Total valid votes		26,200	100.00		
Total rejected ballots		128	0.49		
Turnout		26,328	61.69		
Registered Voters		42,678			
New Democratic gain from Liberal		Swing		+4.01	
Source: Elections BC

=== Federal ===
2015 Canadian federal election: Pitt Meadows—Maple Ridge
Party	Candidate	Votes	%	±%	Expenditures
Liberal	Dan Ruimy	17,673	33.89	+28.51	$19,154.65
Conservative	Mike Murray	16,373	31.40	–23.45	$104,478.03
New Democratic	Bob D'Eith	15,450	29.63	–5.26	$52,306.94
Green	Peter Tam	2,202	4.22	–0.66	$5,026.31
Independent	Steve Ranta	452	0.87	–	$1,613.03
Total valid votes/expense limit		52,150	99.77	–	$204,873.50
Total rejected ballots		121	0.23	–	
Turnout		52,271	71.96	–	
Eligible voters		72,635			
Liberal notional gain from Conservative		Swing		+25.98	
Source: Elections Canada

== See also ==
- Mythos (musical project)
