= Pitt Meadows—Maple Ridge =

Federal electoral district in British Columbia, Canada

Coordinates: 49.56°N 122.41°W

British Columbia electoral district
- Interactive map of riding boundaries from the 2025 federal election. Points indicate the cities of Pitt Meadows and Maple Ridge.

Federal electoral district
- Legislature: House of Commons
MP
Marc Dalton
Conservative
- District created: 2013
- First contested: 2015
- Last contested: 2025
- District webpage: profile, map

Demographics
- Population (2011): 94,111
- Electors (2015): 70,289
- Area (km²): 2,141
- Pop. density (per km²): 44
- Census division(s): Fraser Valley, Metro Vancouver
- Census subdivision(s): Maple Ridge, Mission (part), Pitt Meadows, Langley, Katzie, Whonnock

Pitt Meadows—Maple Ridge is a federal electoral district in British Columbia. It encompasses a portion of British Columbia previously included in the electoral district of Pitt Meadows—Maple Ridge—Mission.

Pitt Meadows—Maple Ridge was created by the 2012 federal electoral boundaries redistribution and was legally defined in the 2013 representation order. It came into effect upon the call of the 2015 Canadian federal election, which took place on October 19, 2015.

== Demographics ==
Panethnic groups in Pitt Meadows—Maple Ridge (2011−2021)
Panethnic group	2021		2016		2011	
Panethnic group	Pop.	%	Pop.	%	Pop.	%
European (Note: Statistic includes all persons that did not make up part of a visible minority or an indigenous identity.)	79,935	73.24%	79,445	79.71%	77,435	83.19%
East Asian (Note: Statistic includes total responses of "Chinese", "Korean", and "Japanese" under visible minority section on census.)	6,460	5.92%	4,710	4.73%	3,470	3.73%
South Asian	5,260	4.82%	3,310	3.32%	2,730	2.93%
Indigenous	5,190	4.76%	4,620	4.64%	3,710	3.99%
Southeast Asian (Note: Statistic includes total responses of "Filipino" and "Southeast Asian" under visible minority section on census.)	4,925	4.51%	3,350	3.36%	2,715	2.92%
Middle Eastern (Note: Statistic includes total responses of "West Asian" and "Arab" under visible minority section on census.)	2,700	2.47%	1,130	1.13%	595	0.64%
African	1,610	1.48%	1,145	1.15%	1,130	1.21%
Latin American	1,605	1.47%	1,070	1.07%	720	0.77%
Other (Note: Statistic includes total responses of "Visible minority, n.i.e." and "Multiple visible minorities" under visible minority section on census.)	1,445	1.32%	880	0.88%	585	0.63%
Total responses	109,135	98.84%	99,670	98.58%	93,085	98.91%
Total population	110,416	100%	101,101	100%	94,111	100%
Notes: Totals greater than 100% due to multiple origin responses. Demographics based on 2012 Canadian federal electoral redistribution riding boundaries.

== Members of Parliament ==
This riding has elected the following members of the House of Commons of Canada:

Parliament	Years	Member	Party
Pitt Meadows—Maple Ridge; Riding created from Pitt Meadows—Maple Ridge—Mission
42nd	2015–2019	Dan Ruimy	Liberal
43rd	2019–2021	Marc Dalton	Conservative
44th	2021–2025	Marc Dalton	Conservative
45th	2025–present	Marc Dalton	Conservative

== Election results ==
Graph of election results in Pitt Meadows—Maple Ridge (minor parties that never got 2% of the vote or didn't run consistently are omitted)

=== 2023 representation order ===
2025 Canadian federal election
** Preliminary results — Not yet official **
Party	Candidate	Votes	%	±%	Expenditures
Conservative	Marc Dalton	31,556	47.37	+10.23	
Liberal	Angie Rowell	30,130	45.23	+20.58	
New Democratic	Daniel Heydenrych	4,097	6.15	–25.14	
Rhinoceros	Peter Buddle	456	0.68	+0.38	
People's	Chris Lehner	372	0.56	–4.97	
Total valid votes/expense limit					
Total rejected ballots					
Turnout		66,611	71.44		
Eligible voters		93,234			
Conservative notional hold		Swing		–5.18	
Source: Elections Canada

2021 federal election redistributed results
Party	Vote	%
Conservative	20,811	37.14
New Democratic	17,532	31.29
Liberal	13,813	24.65
People's	3,096	5.53
Green	162	0.29
Others	614	1.10

=== 2013 representation order ===
2021 Canadian federal election
Party	Candidate	Votes	%	±%	Expenditures
Conservative	Marc Dalton	19,371	36.7	+0.5	$74,248.03
New Democratic	Phil Klapwyk	16,869	31.9	+8.0	$69,801.42
Liberal	Ahmed Yousef	13,179	24.9	-4.8	none listed
People's	Juliuss Hoffmann	2,800	5.3	+4.0	$8,076.50
Independent	Steven William Ranta	453	0.9	±0.0	$357.28
Rhinoceros	Peter Buddle	161	0.3	N/A	$0.00
Total valid votes/expense limit		52,833	99.5	–	$112,396.51
Total rejected ballots		278	0.5		
Turnout		53,111	64.4		
Eligible voters		82,495			
Conservative hold		Swing		-3.8	
Source: Elections Canada

2019 Canadian federal election
Party	Candidate	Votes	%	±%	Expenditures
Conservative	Marc Dalton	19,650	36.23	+4.84	$89,237.08
Liberal	Dan Ruimy	16,125	29.73	-4.15	none listed
New Democratic	John Mogk	12,958	23.89	-5.73	$24,526.92
Green	Ariane Jaschke	4,332	7.99	+3.77	$3,184.96
People's	Bryton Cherrier	698	1.29	–	none listed
Independent	Steve Ranta	468	0.86	-0.00	$969.02
Total valid votes/expense limit		54,231	99.45		
Total rejected ballots		298	0.55	+0.32	
Turnout		54,529	67.74	-4.22	
Eligible voters		80,494			
Conservative gain from Liberal		Swing		+4.50	
Source: Elections Canada

2015 Canadian federal election
Party	Candidate	Votes	%	±%	Expenditures
Liberal	Dan Ruimy	17,673	33.89	+28.51	$19,154.65
Conservative	Mike Murray	16,373	31.40	-23.45	$104,478.03
New Democratic	Bob D'Eith	15,450	29.63	-5.26	$52,306.94
Green	Peter Tam	2,202	4.22	-0.66	$5,078.59
Independent	Steve Ranta	252	0.87	–	$1,613.03
Total valid votes/expense limit		52,150	99.77		$204,873.50
Total rejected ballots		121	0.23	–	
Turnout		52,271	71.96	–	
Eligible voters		72,635			
Liberal gain from Conservative		Swing		+25.98	
Source: Elections Canada

2011 federal election redistributed results
Party	Vote	%
Conservative	21,069	54.84
New Democratic	13,404	34.89
Liberal	2,068	5.38
Green	1,877	4.89

== See also ==
- List of Canadian electoral districts
- Historical federal electoral districts of Canada
