= Kevin Spencer (musician) =

Canadian-American musician

- Origin: Hamilton, Ontario, Canada
- Genres: Pop, Rock
- Occupation: Musician
- Years active: 1998–present
- Website: kevinspencer.net

Kevin Spencer (born December 22, 1978) is a Canadian-American musician.

He began his career in music as a member of the Hamilton, Ontario pop band The Misunderstood, one of the 1996 CFNY New Music Search Finalists. In 1997, after The Misunderstood broke up, Spencer moved to Vancouver, British Columbia, as a hired musician for Rymes with Orange, penning the single "Standing in the Rain". Later that year, after leaving RWO, Kevin joined the band Mudgirl, who had a North American radio hit with This Day, which garnered them a spot on Lilith Fair, medium rotation on MuchMusic, and consequently in Rolling Stone.

Between the years 1999 and 2001, he continued performing, recording and touring with Mudgirl, The Kim Band, Rymes with Orange, Mezzanine, and others contributing guitar, bass, drums, programming and voice. In September 2001, Spencer was recruited by Bernard Telsey in New York City to play the role of Roger Davis in the US production of the rock opera Rent. Completing over 550 shows, his contract ended in late 2004. Between the years 2005 and 2009, he toured and worked exclusively for musician and producer Daniel Lanois (U2, Peter Gabriel, Bob Dylan).

He currently resides in Atlanta with his wife Krystee Manifold Spencer (HGTV designer and producer). He can be found touring and recording with America's Premiere 80s Tribute 'Electric Avenue - The 80s MTV Experience', as well as country artist Kristian Bush from Sugarland, among many other recording artists.
