= Dan Ruimy =

Canadian politician

Mayor of Maple Ridge
- In office November 1, 2022 – November 3, 2026
- Preceded by: Mike Morden
- Succeeded by: Jerry Kok

Chairman of the Standing Committee on Industry, Science and Technology
- In office February 16, 2016 – September 11, 2019
- Preceded by: David Sweet

Member of Parliament for Pitt Meadows—Maple Ridge
- In office October 19, 2015 – September 11, 2019
- Preceded by: Randy Kamp
- Succeeded by: Marc Dalton

Personal details
- Born: 1962 (age 63–64) Montreal, Quebec
- Party: Liberal (federal); A Better Maple Ridge (municipal)
- Profession: Small Business Owner; Politician

Daniel Ruimy is a Canadian politician, who represented the riding of Pitt Meadows—Maple Ridge in the House of Commons of Canada from the 2015 federal election until his defeat in the 2019 Canadian federal election. He then served as Mayor of Maple Ridge from 2022 until 2026.

== Early life ==
Ruimy was born in Montreal in 1962. He has Jewish ancestry. His parents Andre and Jacqueline Ruimy ran Cantor's Bakery in Côte-des-Neiges and a grocery store at Habitat 67.

After 27 years working for various food and beverage companies, Ruimy settled in Maple Ridge, British Columbia, where he opened a book cafe.

== Politics ==
Ruimy was elected as a Member of Parliament for the riding of Pitt Meadows—Maple Ridge in the 2015 Canadian federal election. After being sworn in as an MP, Ruimy said that his major priorities involved "homelessness, affordable housing, helping struggling seniors, and providing assistance to youth trying to find jobs".

He served as the Chair of the Standing Committee on Industry, Science and Technology and sat on the Standing Committee on Human Resources, Skills and Social Development and the Status of Persons with Disabilities.

Ruimy was elected as mayor of Maple Ridge in 2022.

== Electoral record ==
2022 Maple Ridge mayoral election
Party	Mayoral candidate	Votes	%
A Better Maple Ridge	Dan Ruimy	6,306	43.88
Maple Ridge First	Mike Morden (X)	4,321	30.07
Independent	Corisa Bell	2,799	19.48
Independent	Darleen Bernard	600	4.17
Independent	Jacques Blackstone	346	2.41

2019 Canadian federal election: Pitt Meadows—Maple Ridge
Party	Candidate	Votes	%	±%	Expenditures
Conservative	Marc Dalton	19,650	36.23	+4.84	$75,427.89
Liberal	Dan Ruimy	16,125	29.73	–4.15	$71,528.56
New Democratic	John Mogk	12,958	23.89	–5.73	$24,526.92
Green	Ariane Jaschke	4,332	7.99	+3.77	$3,184.96
People's	Bryton Cherrier	698	1.29	–	none listed
Independent	Steve Ranta	468	0.86	-0.00	$969.02
Total valid votes/expense limit		54,231	99.45	–	$107,409.23
Total rejected ballots		298	0.55	+0.32	
Turnout		54,529	67.74	–4.22	
Eligible voters		80,494			
Conservative gain from Liberal		Swing		+4.50	
Source: Elections Canada

2015 Canadian federal election: Pitt Meadows—Maple Ridge
Party	Candidate	Votes	%	±%	Expenditures
Liberal	Dan Ruimy	17,673	33.89	+28.51	$19,154.65
Conservative	Mike Murray	16,373	31.40	–23.45	$104,478.03
New Democratic	Bob D'Eith	15,450	29.63	–5.26	$52,306.94
Green	Peter Tam	2,202	4.22	–0.66	$5,026.31
Independent	Steve Ranta	452	0.87	–	$1,613.03
Total valid votes/expense limit		52,150	99.77	–	$204,873.50
Total rejected ballots		121	0.23	–	
Turnout		52,271	71.96	–	
Eligible voters		72,635			
Liberal notional gain from Conservative		Swing		+25.98	
Source: Elections Canada
