= Marc Dalton =

Canadian politician (born 1960)

Marc Dalton MP
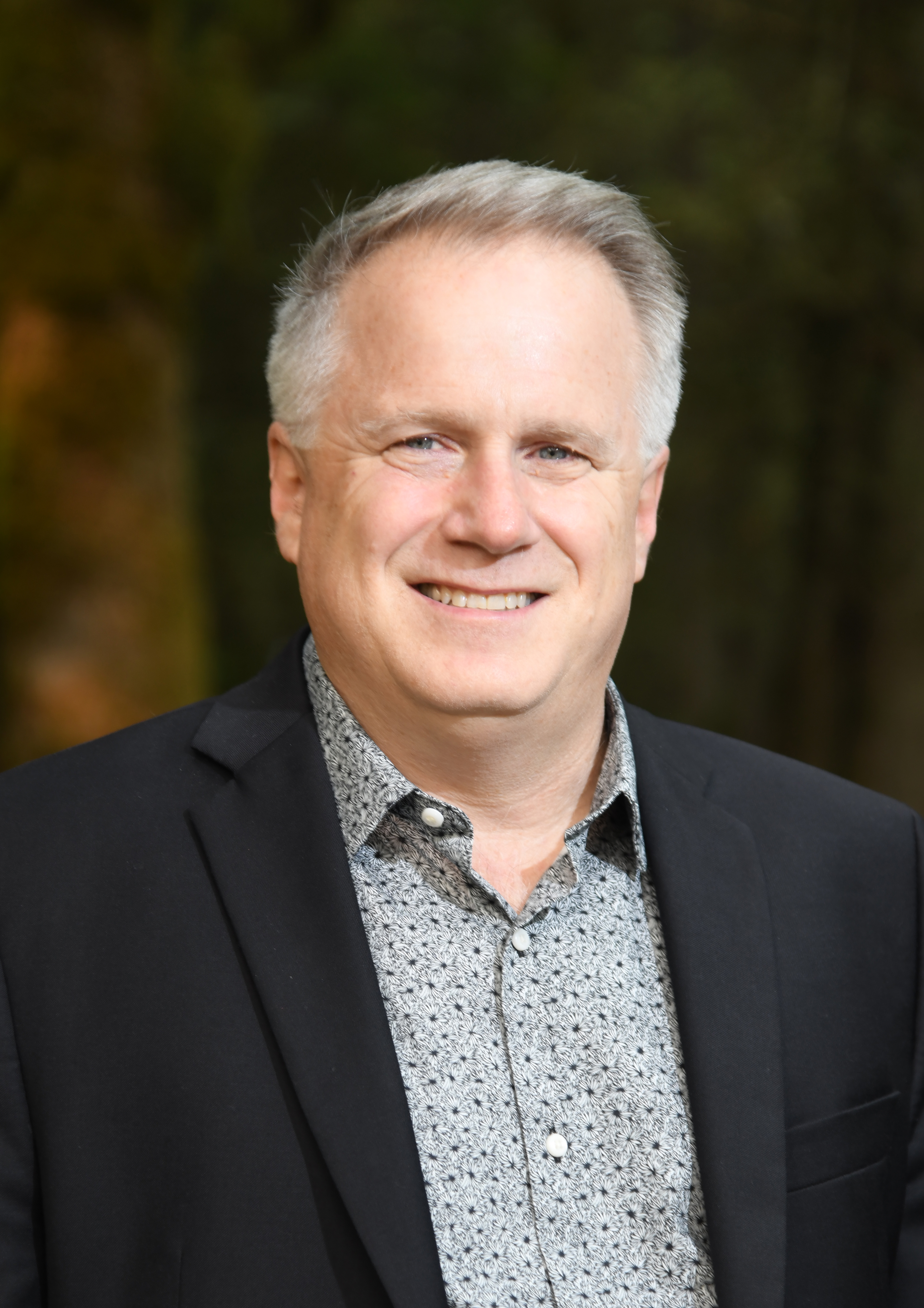
- Dalton in 2020

Member of Parliament for Pitt Meadows—Maple Ridge
- Incumbent
- Assumed office October 21, 2019
- Preceded by: Dan Ruimy

Member of the British Columbia Legislative Assembly for Maple Ridge-Mission
- In office May 12, 2009 – May 9, 2017
- Preceded by: Randy Hawes
- Succeeded by: Bob D'Eith

Personal details
- Born: June 3, 1960 (age 66) CFB Baden–Soellingen, Germany
- Party: Conservative
- Other political affiliations: BC United (provincial)

Marc H.J. Dalton MP is a Canadian politician. He is the current Conservative Member of Parliament for Pitt Meadows—Maple Ridge after the 2019 Canadian federal election. He was a BC Liberal Member of the Legislative Assembly of British Columbia following the 2009 and 2013 provincial elections for the riding of Maple Ridge-Mission.

== Biography and personal life ==
Dalton was born in the Canadian Forces Base of Baden-Soellingen in Germany. His father served in the Royal Canadian Armed Forces, and he spent much of his childhood traveling and living between different bases throughout Canada. Marc is Cree Métis on his father's side and French Canadian on his mother's (née Beaudoin). He is a member of Métis Nation BC.

Dalton studied at Simon Fraser University, where he obtained his Bachelor in French and History and his Master’s in Educational Leadership. He has also attended the British Columbia Institute of Technology. In his youth he volunteered with a non-profit evangelical organization that supported communities in Central America and Canadian inner cities.

Prior to entering politics Marc worked as a teacher in the 42nd Maple Ridge-Pitt Meadows School District. He worked as a teacher for 17 years and taught primarily French Immersion and Socials Studies and the elementary and secondary school level. He also served in the Canadian Armed Forces Reserves shortly after graduating and is a member of the Royal Canadian Legion.

== Political career ==
In 2009, Dalton took a break from teaching and ran as an MLA for the Maple Ridge – Mission region. He went on to win and represented the district for two complete terms as a BC Liberal. As an MLA Marc served as a Parliamentary Secretary for independent schools and was a member of the ‘Experience the Fraser’ steering committee, which was a trails and tourism project. As an MLA he also served as the Parliamentary Secondary to the Minister of Aboriginal Relations.

After getting re-elected in 2013, Marc advocated for renaming the BC Liberals, as he argued it was confusing for voters who may not know that it was a centre-right party. He reasoned that federal Conservative voters might have a hard time voting for the BC Liberals even though they share much of the same values.

In 2015, Marc ran for the Federal Conservative Nomination of Maple Ridge - Pitt Meadows where he lost to the long-time Conservative MP Randy Kamp. After the nomination he returned to the BC Liberals where he served as a backbench member until 2017. In 2019, Marc ran again in the federal election for the Conservative Party, this time winning and beating out the Liberal candidate Dan Ruimy. As a member of 43rd Parliament, Marc served as a Member of the Covid-19 Pandemic Committee, Public Safety and National Security Committee and the Official Languages Committees. He is also a member of numerous Parliamentary Associations and Interparliamentary Groups. Marc was re-elected again in 2021 and still serves as a member of the Official Languages Committee but now also serves as the Chair of the BC Caucus. While in office Marc has been vocal and actively involved in legislation focused on reducing the Carbon Tax.

== Controversies ==
While running in the 2009 British Columbia general election, an email written to a colleague from 1996 while Dalton was a schoolteacher was released by the NDP due to "homophobic comments", according to MLA Spencer Herbert. The email was a response to concerns over overreach in proposed policy changes to address bullying in which Dalton wrote: "I am not against homosexuals as people, but I do not support their lifestyle choices. I believe homosexuality is a moral issue. Most of us agree on many morals: respect, honesty. kindness. There are also many behaviours and acts that most of us would not condone: rape, robbery, assault, drunken driving, pedophilia, incest and so on. There are other moral issues that large segments of our society do not see eye to eye: gambling, abortion, adultery, pornography. I believe that homosexuality fits in this category.” Dalton released an apology, stating he didn't intend to be offensive or hurtful.

In his capacity as Member of Parliament for Pitt Meadows - Maple Ridge, Dalton crafted a tweet met with controversy during the COVID-19 pandemic in Canada on April 13, 2020. In his post, Dalton stated regarding seniors: "Most deaths are in care homes where average life expectancy is 2 yrs & 65% usually pass in the 1st yr. Time to start moving Canada back to work?" The post was removed after being up for several minutes. When questioned about the incident by media organizations, Dalton's office responded with the following, "Our thoughts and prayers are with the hundreds of Canadians who have lost loved ones because of COVID-19. I personally have an uncle in a care home who I love dearly who has contracted coronavirus."

On January 3, 2020, as Member of Parliament for Pitt Meadows - Maple Ridge, Dalton retweeted an opinion column from The Washington Examiner on Twitter titled, "The transgender movement’s message for girls: Your privacy concerns are bigotry" " Dalton defended his re-posting of the article stating he's not pushing the issue aggressively, but spoke about it previously when he was MLA. “It’s concerning for women and for children and young girls to be in a place where there’s someone undressing right in front of them with male genitalia. ... it has to work for everybody,” Dalton said.

== Political positions ==
=== Conversion therapy ===
On June 22, 2021, Dalton along with 61 other Conservative caucus members and one independent voted against Bill C-6, An Act to amend the Criminal Code (conversion therapy). This bill, if fully passed, would criminalize the act conducting conversion therapy on LGBTQ2+ individuals, even if they have consented to it.

=== Carbon tax ===
On numerous occasions in the 44th Parliament, Dalton has spoken in the House of Commons to contest and censure the carbon tax introduced by the Liberal Government in 2018. He cites that as the driving force behind the inflation and the increased cost of living. He wants to repeal the policy in order to reduce the cost of living.

=== LGBTQ ===
In 2014 as an MLA, Dalton voted against an amendment to the Vital Statistics Act that would allow transgender or gender non-binary individuals to change registered sex designation from their sex assigned at birth to reflect their gender identity.

== Electoral record ==
=== Federal ===
2025 Canadian federal election: Pitt Meadows—Maple Ridge
Party	Candidate	Votes	%	±%	Expenditures
Conservative	Marc Dalton	31,924	47.41	+10.27	$97,150.44
Liberal	Angie Rowell	30,728	45.64	+20.99	$57,181.76
New Democratic	Daniel Heydenrych	4,141	6.15	–25.14	$4,693.41
People's	Chris Lehner	368	0.55	–4.98	none listed
Rhinoceros	Peter Buddle	172	0.26	–0.04	none listed
Total valid votes/expense limit		67,333	99.52	–	$138,622.54
Total rejected ballots		322	0.48	–0.05	
Turnout		67,655	71.95	+7.80	
Eligible voters		94,031			
Conservative notional hold		Swing		–5.36	
Source: Elections Canada

2021 Canadian federal election: Pitt Meadows—Maple Ridge
Party	Candidate	Votes	%	±%	Expenditures
Conservative	Marc Dalton	19,371	36.66	+0.43	$72,911.16
New Democratic	Phil Klapwyk	16,869	31.93	+8.03	$65,113.12
Liberal	Ahmed Yousef	13,179	24.94	–4.79	none listed
People's	Juliuss Hoffmann	2,800	5.30	+4.01	$8,076.50
Independent	Steven William Ranta	453	0.86	–	$357.28
Rhinoceros	Peter Buddle	161	0.30	–	none listed
Total valid votes/expense limit		52,833	99.48	–	$112,396.51
Total rejected ballots		278	0.52	–0.02	
Turnout		53,111	64.15	–3.59	
Eligible voters		82,786			
Conservative hold		Swing		–3.80	
Source: Elections Canada

2019 Canadian federal election: Pitt Meadows—Maple Ridge
Party	Candidate	Votes	%	±%	Expenditures
Conservative	Marc Dalton	19,650	36.23	+4.84	$75,427.89
Liberal	Dan Ruimy	16,125	29.73	–4.15	$71,528.56
New Democratic	John Mogk	12,958	23.89	–5.73	$24,526.92
Green	Ariane Jaschke	4,332	7.99	+3.77	$3,184.96
People's	Bryton Cherrier	698	1.29	–	none listed
Independent	Steve Ranta	468	0.86	-0.00	$969.02
Total valid votes/expense limit		54,231	99.45	–	$107,409.23
Total rejected ballots		298	0.55	+0.32	
Turnout		54,529	67.74	–4.22	
Eligible voters		80,494			
Conservative gain from Liberal		Swing		+4.50	
Source: Elections Canada

2006 Canadian federal election: Burnaby—New Westminster
Party	Candidate	Votes	%	±%	Expenditures
New Democratic	Peter Julian	17,391	38.79	+5.07	$67,743.86
Liberal	Mary Pynenburg	13,420	29.94	–3.00	$74,115.51
Conservative	Marc Dalton	12,364	27.58	–0.77	$52,855.97
Green	Scott Henry Janzen	1,654	3.69	–0.16	$1,149.61
Total valid votes/expense limit		44,829	99.68	–	$77,276.88
Total rejected ballots		144	0.32	–0.20	
Turnout		44,973	60.09	+1.13	
Eligible voters		74,848			
New Democratic hold		Swing		+4.03	
Source: Elections Canada

=== Provincial ===
2017 British Columbia general election: Maple Ridge-Mission
Party	Candidate	Votes	%	±%	Expenditures
New Democratic	Bob D'Eith	10,989	41.94	+2.13	$68,144
Liberal	Marc Dalton	10,664	40.70	−5.89	$59,214
Green	Peter Pak Chiu Tam	3,464	13.22	+5.01	$9,786
Conservative	Trevor Hamilton	935	3.57	−1.80	
Libertarian	Jeff Monds	148	0.57	–	
Total valid votes		26,200	100.00		
Total rejected ballots		128	0.49		
Turnout		26,328	61.69		
Registered Voters		42,678			
New Democratic gain from Liberal		Swing		+4.01	
Source: Elections BC

2013 British Columbia general election: Maple Ridge-Mission
Party	Candidate	Votes	%	±%
Liberal	Marc Dalton	10,327	46.59	+0.87
New Democratic	Mike Bocking	8,820	39.81	–5.58
Green	Alex Pope	1,818	8.21	+1.01
Conservative	Chad Thompson	1,190	5.37	–
Total valid votes		22,155	100.00	
Total rejected ballots		152	0.68	
Turnout		22,307	57.91	
Source: Elections BC

B.C. General Election 2009 Maple Ridge-Mission
Party	Candidate	Votes	%	±%
Liberal	Marc Dalton	8,802	45.72%	
NDP	Mike Bocking	8,738	45.39%	
Green	Michael Gildersleeve	1,387	7.20%	–
Reform	Ian Vaughan	325	1.69%	
Total		19,252	100.00%	

== See also ==
- British Columbia Liberal Party
