= Matrix (band) =

American jazz fusion group

Matrix is a jazz fusion group from Appleton, Wisconsin, that started in 1974, noted for tight brass ensemble lines and complex musical themes inspired by literary works, the American Indian, and other significant programmatic themes. Matrix made its biggest impact on the music scene in the 1970s, including appearances at the Monterey Jazz Festival in 1976 and 1977 and the Newport Jazz Festival in 1977.

The group re-formed in 1992, 2000, 2002, and 2009.

Albums include Matrix IX (also the original name of the band), Wizard, Tale of the Whale, Harvest and Proud Flesh.

== Original members ==
- Michael Bard - saxophones
- Larry Darling - trumpet, flugelhorn, synthesizer, vocals
- Kurt Dietrich - trombone, synthesizer, vocals
- Randall Fird - bass, vocals
- Mike Hale - trumpet, flugelhorn, percussion, vocals
- John Harmon - keyboard
- Jeff Pietrangelo - trumpet, flugelhorn, percussion
- Fred Sturm - trombone, vocals
- Tony Wagner - drums

== Latest members (Warner Bros., Pablo touring era, circa 1977–1980) ==
- Larry Darling (Zap) - trumpet, flugelhorn, synthesizer, vocals
- Mike Hale (Tex) - trumpet, flugelhorn, percussion, vocals
- Jeff Pietrangelo (Chimp) - trumpet, flugelhorn, percussion
- Kurt Dietrich (Dietch) - trombone, synthesizer, vocals
- Brad McDougall (Barry) - bass trombone, euphonium, vocals
- John Kirchberger (Kirch) - tenor & soprano saxophones, flute, alto flute
- Randy Tico - bass
- John Harmon (Chief) - keyboard
- Michael Murphy (Murph) - drums

- Peter Butler (Herb) - Senior Sound Engineer
- Doug Lautenschlager (Lauben) - Sound Engineer

== Discography ==
- Matrix IX (RCA - 1976)
- Wizard (Warner Bros. - 1978, reissued on CD in 2009. Wounded Bird Records)
- Tale of the Whale – Recorded in April 1979. Released 1979. Warner Brothers #BSK 3360. Spent 9 weeks on Billboard's Jazz LP chart in late 1979, peaking at #28 on 15 Sept. Reissued on CD July 2009. Wounded Bird Records #WOU 3360. Tracks include: 1) The Fly, 2) Tale Of The Whale, 3) Homage, 4) Galadriel, 5) Nessim, and 6) Narouz.
- Harvest (Pablo - 1979)
- Proud Flesh (Summit - 2002)
