= Maple Ridge East =

Provincial electoral district in British Columbia, Canada

British Columbia electoral district
- Interactive map of riding boundaries

Provincial electoral district
- Legislature: Legislative Assembly of British Columbia
MLA
Lawrence Mok
Conservative
- First contested: 2001
- Last contested: 2026

Demographics
- Population (2021): 57,888
- Area (km²): 369
- Pop. density (per km²): 156.9
- Census division(s): Fraser Valley, Metro Vancouver
- Census subdivision(s): Maple Ridge, Mission (part), Langley 2, Whonnock 1

Maple Ridge East (formerly Maple Ridge-Mission) is a provincial electoral district in British Columbia that has been represented in the Legislative Assembly of British Columbia since 2001.

A riding covering a similar area was first created in 2001 and had its boundaries adjusted in 2008. It adopted its current name and underwent minor boundary changes for the 2024 election, following the 2021 electoral redistribution.

== Demographics ==
Population, 2021	57,888
Area (km^{2})	369
Pop. density (people per km^{2})	156
Source: BC Electoral Boundaries Commission

== Geography ==
Located in the eastern part of Maple Ridge, the district comprises the communities of Stave Falls, Silverhill, Ruskin, Whonnock, Webster's Corners, Albion and Yennadon.

== History ==
Maple Ridge-Pitt Meadows and Mission-Kent were created from Dewdney during the 1989 redistribution. In 2000, Mission-Kent was combined with parts of Maple Ridge-Pitt Meadows to create Maple Ridge-Mission. Finally, in the 2008 redistribution, just over half of the original riding remained, and a portion of Maple Ridge-Pitt Meadows was added to it.

== Members of the Legislative Assembly ==
This riding has elected the following members of the Legislative Assembly:

Assembly	Years	Member	Party
Maple Ridge-Mission; Riding created from Maple Ridge-Pitt Meadows
37th	2001–2005	Randy Hawes	Liberal
38th	2005–2009	Randy Hawes	Liberal
39th	2009–2013	Marc Dalton	Liberal
40th	2013–2017	Marc Dalton	Liberal
41st	2017–2020	Bob D'Eith	New Democratic
42nd	2020–2024	Bob D'Eith	New Democratic
Maple Ridge East
43rd	2024–2026	Lawrence Mok	Conservative
44th	2026–present	Lawrence Mok	Conservative

== Election results ==
2026 British Columbia general election
The 2026 general election will be held on October 24.
Party	Candidate	Votes	%	±%	Expenditures
Green	Daniel Kite				
New Democratic	Hudson Campbell				
Conservative	Lawrence Mok				
Independent	Chris Hatchwell				
Total valid votes					
Total rejected ballots					
Turnout					
Registered voters					
Source: Elections BC

2024 British Columbia general election
Party	Candidate	Votes	%	±%	Expenditures
Conservative	Lawrence Mok	12,058	47.02	–	$13,720.30
New Democratic	Bob D'Eith	11,961	46.64	-7.9	$46,506.63
Green	Kylee Williams	1,626	6.34	-3.8	$0.00
Total valid votes/expense limit		25,645	99.81	–	$71,700.08
Total rejected ballots		49	0.19	–	
Turnout		25,694	57.95	–	
Registered voters		44,335			
Conservative notional gain from New Democratic		Swing		+27.4	
Source: Elections BC

2020 provincial election redistributed results
Party	%
New Democratic	54.5
Liberal	35.4
Green	10.1

2020 British Columbia general election: Maple Ridge-Mission
Party	Candidate	Votes	%	±%	Expenditures
New Democratic	Bob D'Eith	14,721	55.15	+13.21	$44,290.44
Liberal	Chelsa Meadus	9,009	33.75	−6.92	$50,223.21
Green	Matt Trenholm	2,962	11.10	−2.12	$0.00
Total valid votes		26,692	100.00	–	
Total rejected ballots					
Turnout					
Registered voters					
Source: Elections BC

2017 British Columbia general election: Maple Ridge-Mission
Party	Candidate	Votes	%	±%	Expenditures
New Democratic	Bob D'Eith	10,989	41.94	+2.13	$68,144
Liberal	Marc Dalton	10,664	40.70	−5.89	$59,214
Green	Peter Pak Chiu Tam	3,464	13.22	+5.01	$9,786
Conservative	Trevor Hamilton	935	3.57	−1.80	
Libertarian	Jeff Monds	148	0.57	–	
Total valid votes		26,200	100.00		
Total rejected ballots		128	0.49		
Turnout		26,328	61.69		
Registered Voters		42,678			
New Democratic gain from Liberal		Swing		+4.01	
Source: Elections BC

2013 British Columbia general election: Maple Ridge-Mission
Party	Candidate	Votes	%	±%
Liberal	Marc Dalton	10,327	46.59	+0.87
New Democratic	Mike Bocking	8,820	39.81	–5.58
Green	Alex Pope	1,818	8.21	+1.01
Conservative	Chad Thompson	1,190	5.37	–
Total valid votes		22,155	100.00	
Total rejected ballots		152	0.68	
Turnout		22,307	57.91	
Source: Elections BC

B.C. General Election 2009 Maple Ridge-Mission
Party	Candidate	Votes	%	±%
Liberal	Marc Dalton	8,802	45.72%	
NDP	Mike Bocking	8,738	45.39%	
Green	Michael Gildersleeve	1,387	7.20%	–
Reform	Ian Vaughan	325	1.69%	
Total		19,252	100.00%	

2005 British Columbia general election: Maple Ridge-Mission
Party	Candidate	Votes	%
Liberal	Randy Hawes	12,095	44.30
New Democratic	Jenny Stevens	11,896	43.57
Green	William Stanley Walsh	2,633	9.64
Marijuana	Carol Gwilt	314	1.15
Independent	Chum Richardson	312	1.14
Platinum	Keith Smith	53	0.19
Total		26,080	100.00

2001 British Columbia general election: Maple Ridge-Mission
Party	Candidate	Votes	%	Expenditures
Liberal	Randy Hawes	12,920	56.67	$36,054
New Democratic	Rose Bennett	4,710	20.66	$19,157
Green	Dawn Paley	2,910	12.76	$296
Unity	David Ritchie	1,037	4.55	$1,487
Marijuana	Denise Briere-Smart	908	3.98	$394
Independent	Dale Randall	252	1.11	$4,144
Independent	Chum Richardson	81	0.49	$103
Total valid votes		22,800	100.00	
Total rejected ballots		127	0.56	
Turnout		22,927	70.87	

== See also ==
- List of British Columbia provincial electoral districts
- Canadian provincial electoral districts
