= Lawrence Mok =

Canadian politician

Lawrence Mok MLA

Member of the British Columbia Legislative Assembly for Maple Ridge East
- Incumbent
- Assumed office October 19, 2024
- Preceded by: Bob D'Eith

Personal details
- Born: Singapore
- Party: BC Conservative
- Profession: Electrical engineer

Lawrence Mok MLA is a Singaporean-born Canadian politician who has served as a member of the Legislative Assembly of British Columbia (MLA) representing the electoral district of Maple Ridge East since 2024. He is a member of the Conservative Party.

== Early life and career ==
In 1988, Mok emigrated to Canada from Singapore along with his wife and two children. They have lived in Maple Ridge, British Columbia for 35 years.

Mok has attended universities in Canada and the United States, earning a total of nine degrees including a Bachelor of Applied Science & Technology, Bachelor of Electrical Engineering, Master of Business Administration, Master of Arts in Religion, Master of Divinity, Master of Theology, Doctor of Religious Studies, Doctor of Business Administration, and Doctor of Philosophy in Business Administration.

Mok is a member of The Institute of Electrical and Electronics Engineers, The Institution of Engineering and Technology, The Chartered Management Institute, and an associate member of the Evangelical Theological Society. Additionally, he is a registered Applied Science Technologist in Canada, a registered Incorporated Engineer in the UK, and a Chartered Manager in the UK.

With over 30 years of experience in the manufacturing, installation, sales, and services of overhead cranes and hoists in BC, he has worked with various industries including steel production, sawmills, construction, mining, and waste treatment.

Mok has also taught business management as a guest lecturer at universities in Canada, China, and North Africa. He also preaches part-time at multiple local churches and has volunteered with the Maple Ridge Salvation Army Church.

== Political career ==
In July 2024, Mok was nominated as the BC Conservative Party candidate for Maple Ridge East. In October 2024, he narrowly defeated BC NDP incumbent Bob D'Eith by 97 votes in the provincial election. After his election, he was appointed to the Conservative shadow cabinet as critic for skills development and international credentials.

In February 2026, Mok was among the BC Conservative caucus members who voted in favour of the first reading of independent MLA Tara Armstrong's private member's bill, the Human Rights Code Repeal Act, which sought to repeal British Columbia's Human Rights Code and abolish the province's Human Rights Tribunal. The bill was defeated 50–37 at first reading and did not proceed further. The caucus's support at first reading drew criticism; the party said that voting in favour of first reading reflected a legislative convention of allowing bills to be introduced and read, rather than an endorsement of the bill's substance.

== Electoral record ==
2024 British Columbia general election: Maple Ridge East
Party	Candidate	Votes	%	±%	Expenditures
Conservative	Lawrence Mok	12,058	47.02	–	$13,720.30
New Democratic	Bob D'Eith	11,961	46.64	-7.9	$46,506.63
Green	Kylee Williams	1,626	6.34	-3.8	$0.00
Total valid votes/expense limit		25,645	99.81	–	$71,700.08
Total rejected ballots		49	0.19	–	
Turnout		25,694	57.95	–	
Registered voters		44,335			
Conservative notional gain from New Democratic		Swing		+27.4	
Source: Elections BC
