= Terrence Brewer =

American jazz musician and educator

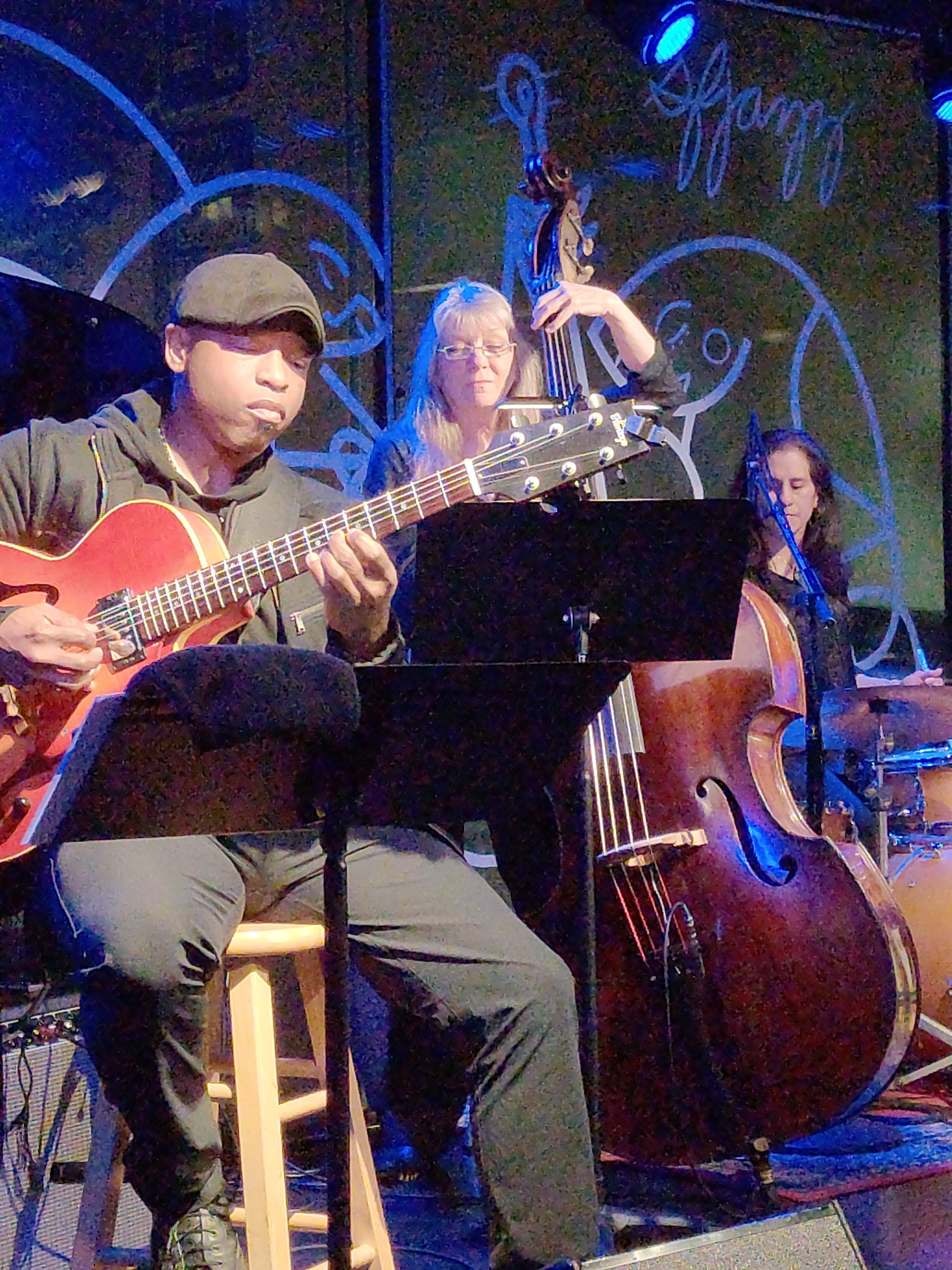
- Terrence Brewer, Ruth Davies, and Sylvia Cuenca playing music at SFJAZZ on 2026-02-23
- Website: https://terrencebrewer.com/

Terrence Brewer is an American jazz guitarist and educator. He has taught at the San Francisco Conservatory of Music and at San Francisco University High School.

== Discography ==
- 2006 - The Calling: Volume One
- 2006 - The Calling: Volume Two
