= Electric Avenue (band) =

2010's American 80s pop music cover band

- Origin: Atlanta, Georgia, United States
- Genre: Pop music
- Years active: 2013–present
- Members: Kevin Spencer; Chris Pou; Shannon Pengelly; Tom Young; Eric Frampton; Will Groth
- Website: electricavenuemusic.com

Electric Avenue is an American music band known for performing 1980s pop hits.

== History ==
Electric Avenue was formed in 2013 when a group of musicians came together for a one-time 1980s tribute performance. As changes in the music industry reduced traditional album sales, the group chose to continue as a permanent tribute band. Unlike many 1980s tribute acts, Electric Avenue began emphasizing musical authenticity rather than costumes or visual presentation.

In 2019, Electric Avenue was selected to perform at the launch of the film Blinded By The Light in Asbury Park, New Jersey. The event featured Bruce Springsteen and filmmaker Gurinder Chadha and celebrated the influence of 1980s music and culture.

== Music ==
Electric Avenue performs songs by 1980s artists including Tears for Fears, Wham!, Duran Duran, Simple Minds, Howard Jones, Frankie Goes To Hollywood, Level 42, Naked Eyes, Soft Cell, Kenny Loggins, INXS, Prince, The Clash, and David Bowie. The band favors musically complex and less frequently performed songs over mainstream hits.

Electric Avenue has performed internationally on cruises with celebrities such as the cast of The Walking Dead, Kid Rock, and Pitbull. They have also shared the stage with artists such as Pat Benatar, Mike Mills of R.E.M., Richard Page of Mr.Mister, Gavin Rossdale of Bush, and Bobby Kimball of Toto.

In 2019, Warner Music issued a cease-and-desist letter after mistakenly believing the band had used original recordings on its social media channels. After reviewing a full live performance recording, Warner Music withdrew the claim and issued an apology.

== Band members ==
- Kevin Spencer (lead vocalist and guitarist)
- Chris Pou (mixer)
- Shannon Pengelly (guitarist and vocalist)
- Tom Young (bassist and vocalist)
- Eric Frampton (keyboards and vocalist)
- Will Groth (drummer)

== Discography ==
=== Albums ===
- Electric Avenue (2012)
- Deadwood (2021)

=== EPs ===
- Live at the Factory (2021)
- Live at the Factory Part 2! (2023)
