= Bari Koral =

American singer-songwriter

Bari Koral is a singer-songwriter and Yoga instructor from New York City. Her music career began in pop-rock, touring the college circuit for months at a time to finance the release of her records herself.

In 2007, she formed The Bari Koral Family Band with jazz bassist Dred Scott and drummer Eric Halverson, releasing a self-titled 6-song EP of "rock songs for kids that parents dig." Their first LP, Rock and Roll Garden, was released in 2010 on Koral's label, Loopytunes. Anna and the Cupcakes, was released in 2012, also on Loopytunes. Bari tours extensively throughout the United States, both with (and sometimes without) the band, playing private events, children's shows, fundraisers and parties.

== Discography ==
- Joy (1999)
- Cloudwalking (2002)
- Confessions of An Indiegirl (2004)
- Bari Koral Family Rock Band (2007)
- Rock and Roll Garden (2010)
- Anna and the Cupcakes (2012)
