= Jennifer Scott (musician) =

Background information
- Born: Vancouver, British Columbia, Canada
- Genres: Jazz
- Occupation(s): Singer, pianist, arranger
- Instrument: Piano
- Website: jenniferscott.ca

Jennifer Scott is a singer and pianist born in Vancouver, BC, Canada. She specializes in jazz, blues, and world music.

== Career ==
Scott grew up in Blueridge, a neighbourhood in the District of North Vancouver; a suburb of the city of Vancouver, BC, Canada She developed an interest in jazz from the choir director, Dennis Colpitts, at Windsor Secondary school. In her teens in the 1970s she heard visiting musician Clark Terry. She studied jazz at Vancouver Community College and classical music at University of British Columbia.

She has recorded cover versions of pop songs that are unusual to jazz, such as "It's My Party" by Lesley Gore and "Tupelo Honey" by Van Morrison.

== Discography ==
- Interactive (1994)
- Live at Monk's (2001)
- Something to Live By (2002)
- Emotional Girl (2005)
- Live at the Cellar (Cellar Live, 2007)
- Mile 41 (2007)
- Crossing Borders (2008)
- Storybook (2009)
