= Kanaka =

Kanaka may refer to:

== People ==
- Kanaka (given name), an Indian name (including a list of persons with the name)
  - Kanaka (actress), Indian film actress
- Kanaka (Pacific Island worker), workers from Pacific Islands employed in British colonies and in North American fur trade and goldfields
- Kānaka Maoli, the traditional name native of the Hawaiian people

== Places ==
- Kanaka Bar, British Columbia, an unincorporated area in the Fraser Canyon of British Columbia
- Kanaka Creek, British Columbia, a historical settlement and modern neighbourhood in the District of Maple Ridge, British Columbia, Canada
- Kanaka Creek Regional Park, a regional park run by the Greater Vancouver Regional District, in Maple Ridge, British Columbia, Canada
- Kanaka, Crimea, Black sea resort town

== Other uses ==
- Kanaka pigeon, an extinct bird of New Caledonia and Tonga
- Kanaka, the Sanskrit name for a species of Datura
- Kanaka (film), a 2018 Indian romantic action film
- Kanaka Bar First Nation, the Nlaka'pamux First Nations government at the Kanaka Bar, British Columbia
- Kanaka Shree, an award instituted by the government of Karnataka, India

== See also ==
- Kanak (disambiguation)
- Kanake, a racial epithet in the German language, derived from the Melanesian term
