= Kanaka Creek =

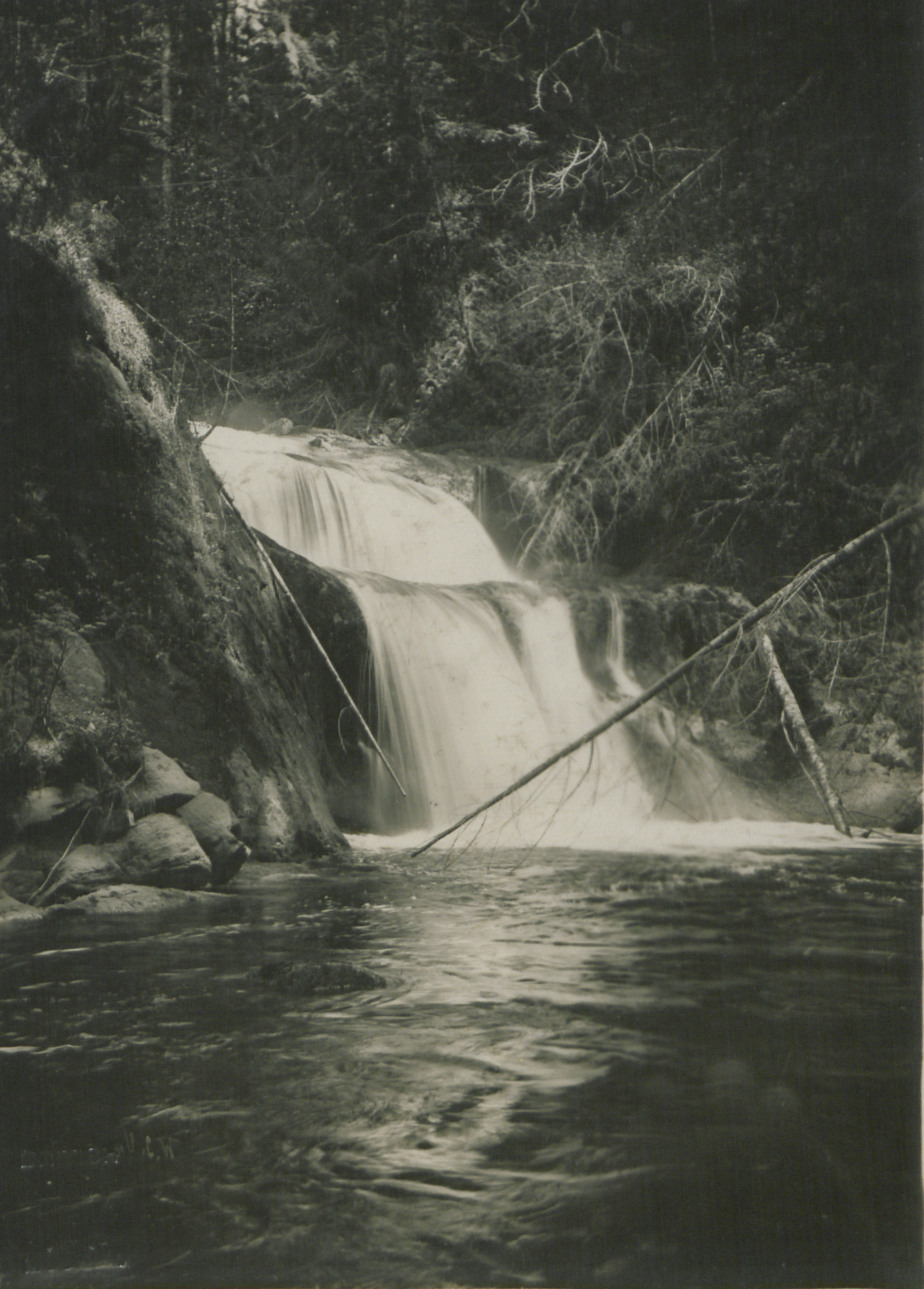
- South Kanaka Creek Falls, near Websters Corners, 1915

Location
- Country: Canada
- Province: British Columbia
- District: New Westminster Land District

Physical characteristics
- Source: Coast Mountains
  - coordinates: 49°16′47″N 122°25′46″W
  - elevation: 920 m (3,020 ft)
- Mouth: Fraser River
  - location: Maple Ridge, Metro Vancouver
  - coordinates: 49°12′2″N 122°35′9″W
  - elevation: 6 m (20 ft)
- Basin size: 47.7 km^{2} (18.4 sq mi)
- Discharge
  - location: Websters Corners
  - average: 2.74 m^{3}/s (97 cu ft/s)
  - minimum: 0.026 m^{3}/s (0.92 cu ft/s)
  - maximum: 130 m^{3}/s (4,600 cu ft/s)

Kanaka Creek is a tributary of the Fraser River, in the Canadian province of British Columbia. It flows through Maple Ridge, a district municipality at the eastern edge of Metro Vancouver.

The creek's name is reflected in the name of the local community of Kanaka Creek. Creek and community both were named for a settlement of Kanakas (Hawaiian natives) in the employ of the Hudson's Bay Company (HBC), known as Kanakas. The HBC trading post of Fort Langley was located just across the Fraser River from Kanaka Creek. Originally Fort Langley was a few kilometres downriver, at what is now Derby. The mouth of Kanaka Creek is between the old and new sites of Fort Langley.

== Course ==
Kanaka Creek originates near Blue Mountain, between Alouette Lake and Stave Lake. It flows south, then west to the Fraser River, which it joins between Haney and Albion. The lower half of the creek is within Kanaka Creek Regional Park.

== See also ==
- List of rivers of British Columbia
- List of tributaries of the Fraser River
