= Whonnock =

- Rural community
- Location in British Columbia
- Coordinates: 49°12′00″N 122°26′00″W
- Country: Canada
- Province: British Columbia
- City: Maple Ridge

Whonnock is a rural, naturally treed, and hilly community on the north side of the Fraser River in the eastern part of the City of Maple Ridge, British Columbia, Canada. It is approximately 56 kilometres east of Downtown Vancouver on the Lougheed Highway. Whonnock shares borders with three other Maple Ridge communities. To the west, the borders are 256th Street with Albion and upper Kanaka Creek with Webster's Corners. To the east, Whonnock Creek forms the border with Ruskin. To the north is the municipal border and to the south the Fraser River.

The name Whonnock is derived from a Halkomelem word for humpback salmon or pink salmon, the only kind of salmon to ascend Whonnock Creek. Whonnock Creek flows from the north, above Dewdney Trunk Road, south to the Fraser River passing Whonnock Lake or from Xwô:leqw / Wõ:leqw.

== Whonnock First Nation ==
Whonnock Indian Reserve No. 1 is located at the confluence of Whonnock Creek and the Fraser River. This Reserve is under the jurisdiction of the Kwantlen First Nation, headquartered on McMillan Island at Fort Langley.

First Nations have been living continuously in the area for more than 10,000 years.

About 25 years before Simon Fraser came downriver in 1808 a wave of smallpox wiped out, or nearly so, the villages in this area, including the one at Whonnock Creek. Those villages were connected to a First Nations tribe of the Boundary Bay area that was also destroyed by the epidemic. Around the time of settlement of Fort Langley (ca. 1827) First Nations people started to repopulate the deserted places. In historical times the Whonnock Tribe of the Kwantlen First Nation lived here. They had their own Chief. The last member of the Whonnocks tribe living on the reserve died in 1951.

== Settlement and history ==
The first permanent white settler and landowner in Whonnock was a man from Shetland, Robert Robertson, who settled in Whonnock with his First Nations wife in 1861 and in the following 25 years raised a family next to the village of the Whonnocks without any white settlers close by.

The selection of Whonnock for a railroad station on the transcontinental railroad (Just because the place happened to be 10 miles from the next station, Hammond) initiated the community of today. After the trains started running regularly in 1885 the railroad brought a stream of new settlers.

From 1885 onward Whonnock rapidly became the focal point for settlers all over the eastern part of Maple Ridge as well as Glen Valley across the Fraser and on lands across the Stave River. Whonnock soon boasted, aside from a railway station, a post office, a school, and a general store, amenities not available elsewhere for some time. Added to that were a growing number of churches.

Most of the new residents were of British descent and came from other parts of Canada, but other nationalities were also here. Norwegian immigrants and their descendants played a significant part in the history of the community.

In general the settlers made their livelihood fishing and logging. Subsistence farming was essentially the only kind of farming in this mostly poor neighbourhood but, as elsewhere in Maple Ridge, a few residents developed small-scale commercial fruit growing and poultry farming. There was a small number of affluent permanent or summer residents – hobby "rangers" – who could afford employing others to do the manual work.

From the 1920s until their expulsion in 1942, the Japanese settlers – a large part of the population – made use of the slopes facing south for extensive berry farming.

Lumberyards and mills continue to be active on the waterfront until the present day although today on a smaller scale than before.

Women, through the church and other organizations, played an important part in the shaping of community life. In 1912 they created and started operating a community hall that remained the centre of social activities for some forty years.

== Current ==
Many people keep horses, and have poultry, sheep, goats and llamas. There are some small tree and fruit farms.

=== Whonnock Lake Park ===
Whonnock Lake is a typical bog lake. The only regular water input is from the north. There is an exit to Whonnock Creek on the south-east side. Whonnock Lake Park offers a stand of mature trees, a grassy playground, and a small sandy beach, which allow swimming, hiking, and nature study.

The park is home to native plants and thriving colonies of beavers and muskrats, as well as to breeding populations of loons, mallard ducks, and numerous small birds. The lake is stocked annually with rainbow trout, and supports a substantial recreational fishery.

=== Whonnock Lake Centre ===
In 1988 the Whonnock Community Association opened Whonnock Lake Centre in Whonnock Lake Park.

In 2013, after taking care of the operation of the Centre for 25 years, the Whonnock Community Association transferred the management of the Centre to the City of Maple Ridge.

Whonnock Lake Centre serves in the first place as community hall for Whonnock residents. It is also a well-known location for weddings and other events.

=== Whonnock Community Association ===
The name Whonnock Community Association (WCA) was registered in 1981 but a group of volunteers interested in the wellbeing of the community operated before under different names. The Association sponsors and organizes community events.

=== Ridge Canoe and Kayak Club ===
Ridge Canoe and Kayak Club (RCKC) is a flat-water sprint-paddling club based at Whonnock Lake. It consists of athletes of all levels. Initially begun as an Olympic racing club in 1982, RCKC has expanded to many other areas of paddling sports. RCKC also offers programs for recreational paddlers.

=== Maple Ridge Fire Hall No. 2 ===
Fire Hall No. 2 in Whonnock was built in 1974. The area covered by Hall No. 2 reaches from 256th Street east to the Mission border.

=== Post office ===
Whonnock has had a post office and a postmaster since 1885. Originally the owner of the general store was also postmaster. In 1914, when the postmaster stopped being the shopkeeper, he moved the post office to its present site. The post office is today in a building that dates back to ca. 1932. The Whonnock postmaster is the last in the Lower Mainland bearing that title.

=== Schools ===
Whonnock is served by School District 42 Maple Ridge-Pitt Meadows . There has been a school in Whonnock since 1885. Originally the school stood on the shore of the Fraser River, south of the railway tracks, it was moved around 1910 to the northwest corner of 272nd Street and 100th Avenue. In 1998 a new building was opened on 112th Avenue, close to Whonnock Lake. There are 275 children from Kindergarten to Grade 7 at the school.

=== Stores ===
The only retail business in a store building in Whonnock today is the McFli Feed Store in the old Red and White Store building next to the post office.

The first general store built ca. 1884, went up in flames in 1918. It was not rebuilt and the location today is under the Lougheed Highway. Other existing local stores took over the business notably Graham's store, that was across from the post office, and Luno's store and later Showler's Red and White Store. They all succumbed after the Second World War when cars and supermarkets became universal.

=== Artisans ===
Numerous artisans call Whonnock home such as weavers, spinners, potters, leather craft workers and candle makers.
