= Kanaka Creek Regional Park =

Regional park in British Columbia

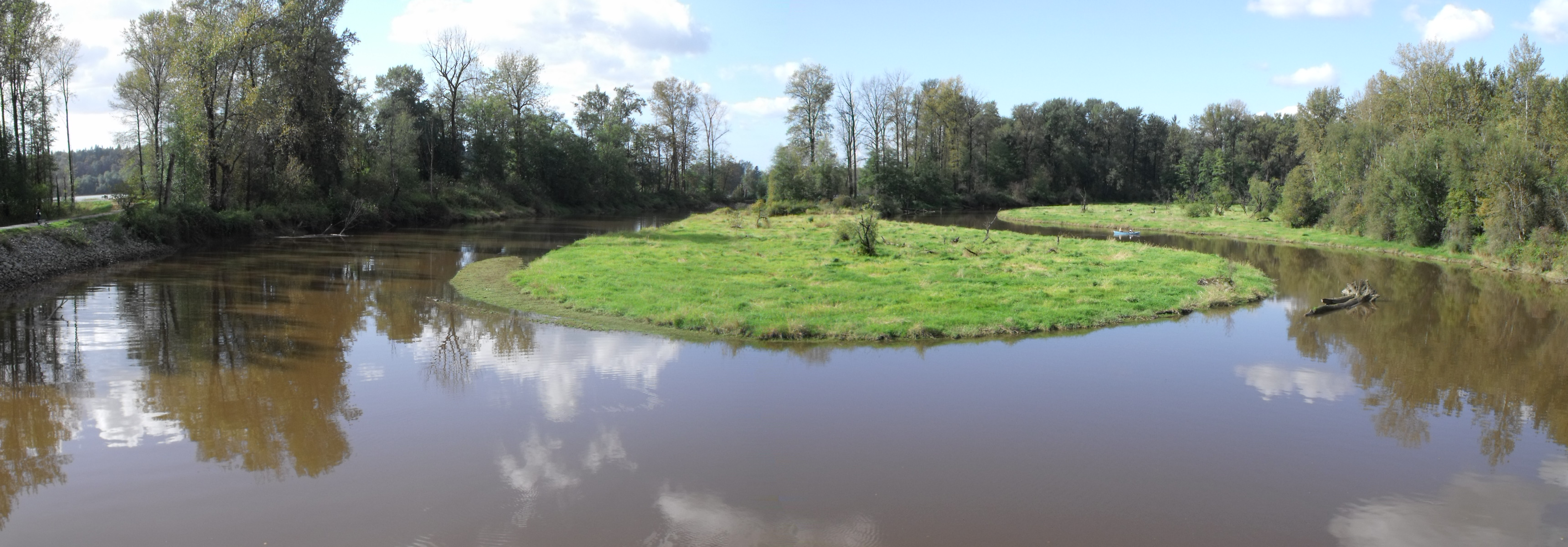
- Interactive map of Kanaka Creek Regional Park
- Type: Regional Park
- Location: Maple Ridge
- Nearest city: Maple Ridge, British Columbia, Canada
- Coordinates: 49.2106°N 122.5247°W
- Area: 400 hectares (990 acres)
- Established: Plants and Wildlife
- Operator: Metro Vancouver Regional District
- Website: metrovancouver.org/services/regional-parks/park/kanaka-creek-regional-park

Kanaka Creek Regional Park is a regional park of the Greater Vancouver Regional District, located in the city of Maple Ridge, British Columbia, flanking both sides of Kanaka Creek from its confluence with the Fraser River just east of Haney and extending approximately 11 km (7 mi) up the creek to just south of the community of Webster's Corners. The Maple Ridge Fairgrounds are just east of the lower regions of the park, beyond them is the community of Albion. Derby Reach Regional Park is just across the Fraser in Langley.

A variety of plants and animals can be located in all 3 areas of the park and it is a popular spot for both Black Bear and Salmon populations. Kanaka Creek Regional Park has a rich history- the first purchase of land for the park by the City of Maple Ridge occurred in the late 1970s, and the land is the historic territory of the Katzie, Kwantlen, Matsqui, Musqueam, Semiahmoo, and Tsleil-Waututh peoples. Recently, misuse of the land has negatively changed parts of the park. To fix this issue, Metro Vancouver Regional Parks implemented a 20 year management plan in 2004 with the assistance of the Katzie First Nation among other groups, and the University of Victoria (UVIC) completed a restoration project in areas of the park in 2022.

== Recreation ==
Kanaka Creek is widely recognized for its natural beauty, as well as recreational appeal. According to a local newspaper, the Daily Hive, Kanaka is the 8th most popular park in metro Vancouver, with 610,500 visitors in 2022. The park features walking, hiking, and biking trails publicly available to anyone who wants to use them. Along these walks there is plenty of flora and fauna to view. The park also has a lake in which visitors can fish, or canoe . The park is wheelchair accessible, and equipped with parking and public washrooms.

The 400 ha. park has three main areas. The Riverfront area adjacent to the Fraser and BC Hwy 7 has picnic tables and a boat-launch, suitable for launching canoes and kayaks for navigating the slow-moving waters of Kanaka Creek up as far as the 240th Street bridge. The Riverfront Trail winds along this stretch of the creek and has a number of three-story wooden viewing towers. Above 240th Street the stream is shallower and full of snags and not suitable for boating. Above that a popular swimming hole with slickrock slides is at Cliff Falls. There are twin falls on Kanaka Creek, one on each of its upper fork. Much of the upper area of the park is heavily forested, though hiking along the creek beds is feasible and a number of wooden walkways through the forest and along the creek have been established in the area.

== Landscape ==
Kanaka Creek Regional Park (KCRP) is an ecological region consisting of many diverse ecosystems and wildlife. With a general landscape of Fraser River frontage, steep canyons, marshland fields, floodplains, riparian forests, and upland forests that provide habitat for native plants and wildlife. Currently, the KCRP land base includes 413 hectares with water flow from Blue Mountain to the Fraser River. KCRP is split among four main sections: the riverfront, lower reach & fish fence, mid reach & cliff falls, and the upper reach and hatchery. Surrounding these areas, the upper reach consists of working agriculture and woodlands, while the lower reach is bounded by residential neighbourhoods. This diverse landscape also offers many recreation opportunities, including places to walk, hike, bird watch, and picnic. Furthermore, KCRP's landscape is embedded with history and spiritual significance throughout over nine thousand years of use. This territory is shared among the Kwantlen, Katzie, Matsqui, Musqueam, Semiahmoo, and Tsleil-Waututh nations.

== Plants and Wildlife ==
=== Plants ===
Kanaka Creek is the home of a variety of plant species. Most of the park is considered a Coastal Douglas Fir biogeoclimatic zone- however, the conditions change slightly along the creek path.

The park is home to over 7 tree species including the Douglas fir, western red cedar, and bigleaf maple. The more humid areas of the park host around 6 species of fern such as the lady fern and spiny wood fern. Common BC native shrubs are also located here like the salmonberry and blue elderberry and over 40 species of native flowers like Pacific bleeding hearts and false lilies of the valley. Toxic plants like skunk cabbage can also be spotted in the park.

=== Wildlife ===
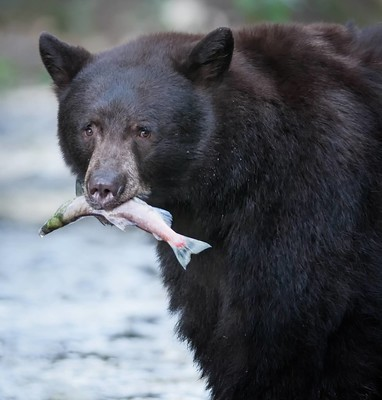
"Black bear" by CaliforniaDFW

Wildlife can be considered a main attraction for Kanaka Creek which has both an active black bear and salmon population. Black bears regularly occupy Kanaka Creek as it provides a connection to the Fraser River and mature forests which are both important to the well being of the local black bear population. The spawning salmon that pass through Kanaka Creek are also a staple food source. Salmon spend time in the area throughout the year in the creek and in the Bell-Irving Hatchery. The hatchery is located in the park and aims to educate the public about salmon conservation in the creek. Both the hatchery and waterways see Chum, Pink and Coho Salmon. Large mammals found in the park include the cougar, bobcat, coyote, red fox, and deer. Both small aquatic and on-land mammals also reside here including the river otter and striped skunk. The park has a wide variety of shrews, bats, voles, and squirrels. Amphibians and reptiles also can be located including frogs, toads, salamanders, and snakes. Birds are the most abundant species at Kanaka Creek with over 130 species that have been spotted.

=== Species at Risk ===
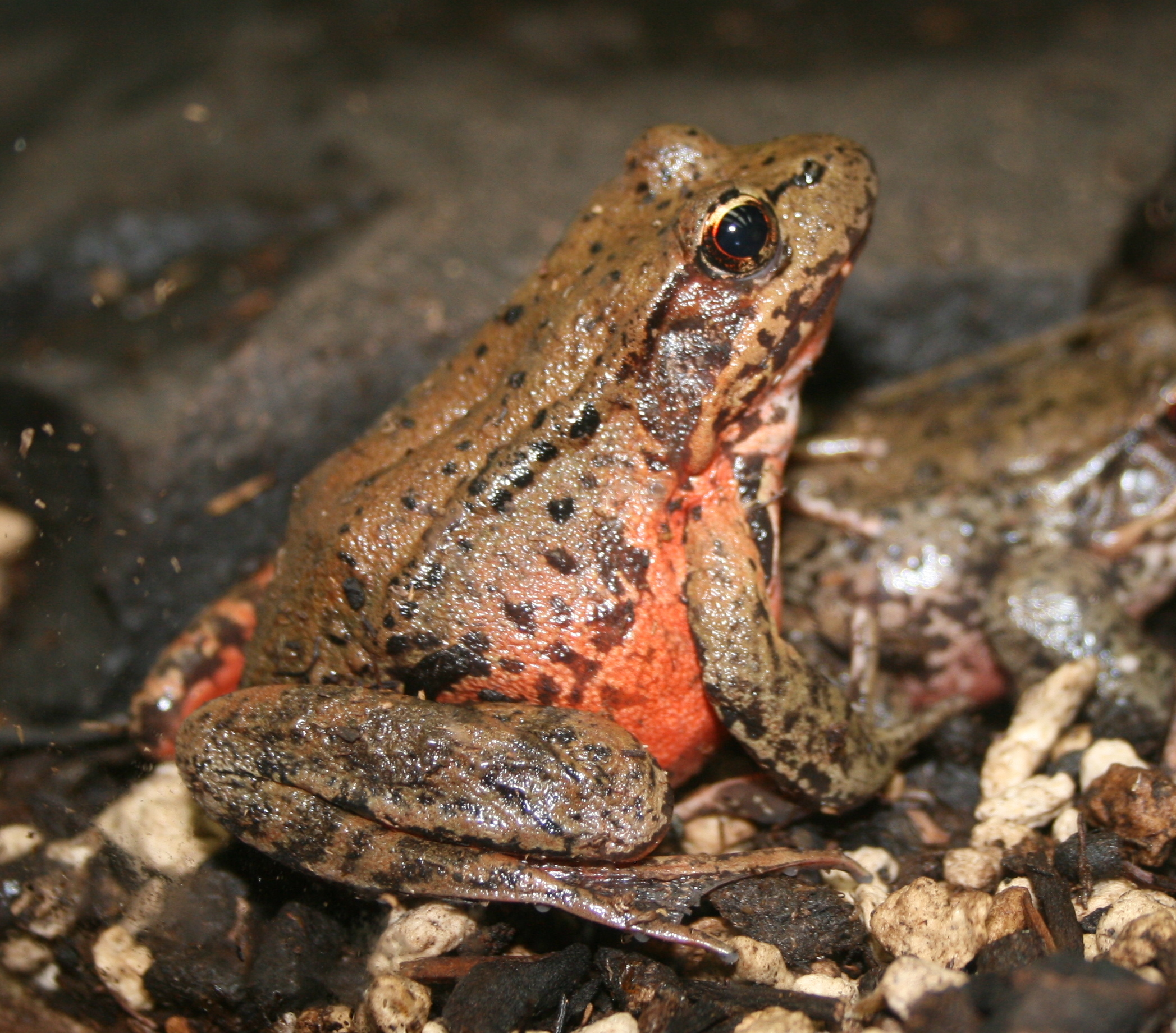
"Northern Red-legged Frog" by born1945

Under the Forest and Range Practices Act, the coastal tailed frog, northern red-legged frog, and Pacific water shrew are considered 'species at risk' and are all found in the park. Both the coastal tailed frog and the northern red-legged frog can be found in shaded small, slow streams. Their habitats are regularly disturbed by forest harvesting and road construction. The Pacific water shrew can be found in forests along slow-moving streams however the species is endangered and considered extremely rare. This shrew species is affected by any disturbances in its wetland habitat. Under the Conservation Status Rank List of British Columbia, the northern red-legged frog is on the Blue List (species of special concern), the coastal tailed frog is on the Yellow List (least risk of being lost), and the Pacific water shrew is on the Red List (risk of being lost).

== History ==
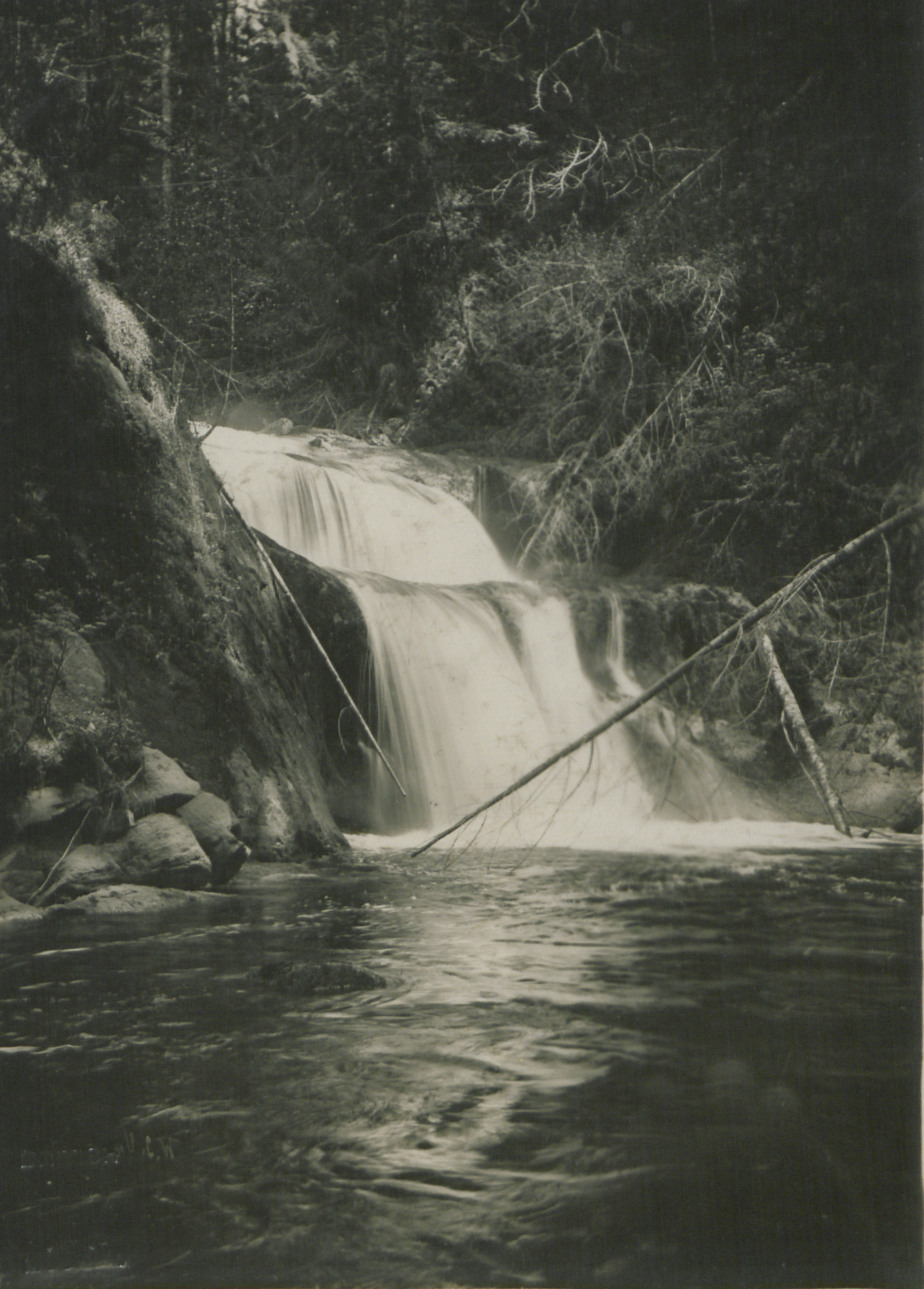
South Kanaka Creek Falls, 1915

In the late 1970s, the City of Maple Ridge started buying out private properties within the proposed borders of the park, which led to pushback from those who had property in the watershed. Following this, an agreement was made in 1981 that would protect as much of the watershed as possible and uproot as few residents as possible, leading to the linear shape of the park that fulfilled the original goal of creating an area for recreation while protecting the natural landscape. The final land purchase and addition to the park was made in 1993.

=== Indigenous History ===
Kanaka Creek Regional Park is part of the Katzie, Kwantlen, Matsqui, Musqueam, Semiahmoo, and Tseil-Waututh peoples unceded traditional territory. The populations native to Kanaka were ravaged by a plague in 1750, and much of the surviving populous was taken out by another wave of disease in the early 1800s. The current name Kanaka is from the Hawaiian and Pacific Islander population who lived there in the 1850s. The word Kanaka is Hawaiian slang for worker, referring to the primarily working class Hawaiian families occupying the area.

== Human Impact ==
=== Issues ===
As the landscape changed due to active logging by the Abernethy and Lougheed Lumber Company in the 1920s, the park now lacks a sizeable amount of original old growth forest, which has resulted in significant damage to the hydrological regimes and surrounding vegetation. As a result, species are facing habitat loss with a greater risk of becoming threatened, endangered, or extirpated.

The creek itself is also undergoing increasing water quality problems resulting from rapidly growing urbanization, eutrophication, agricultural and industrial activities, and other human impacts. In addition, organic contamination is considered to be one of the main driving factors in the degradation of water quality in Kanaka Creek. Due to approximately 900 septic tanks in the watershed as well as contributing factors of herbicide and pesticide washing into the creek, massive loss of fish habitat is impacting ecosystems.

Furthermore, other issues arise due to clay deposits near the surface preventing the absorption of surface runoff during the stormy seasons. This is triggering flooding in the lower reaches, which is causing erosion and siltation and flushing out fish stocks. Due to these issues, the creek was designated as a sensitive habitat under the BC Provincial Fish Protection Act, which protects Pacific salmon species such as chum, coho, and pink salmon.

=== Groups Involved ===
A number of groups have interest in this park. Kanaka Creek Regional Park is operated by Metro Vancouver Regional Parks, and hosts the Kanaka Education and Environmental Partnership Society (KEEPS), which operates the Bell-Irving Hatchery and the Kanaka Creek Watershed Stewardship Centre. KEEPS holds events in the park like Return of the Salmon day and educational open houses for free. They also host paid educational programs in the park and can visit classrooms as well. The Katzie First Nation was also involved in the creation of the current management plan.

=== Management Plan ===
Alongside the Katzie First Nation, KEEPS, the Alouette Field Naturalists, and the City of Maple Ridge, Metro Vancouver Regional Parks (as the operator of the park) created a plan for the park in 2004. It was set to remain the management plan for 20 years. The plan considers human intrusion through unauthorized trails and dumping, visitors in the park, the status of species in the park, areas of the park susceptible to damage, resources in the park, and the location of the park in consideration to other greenways in the area. Goals of this management strategy include protecting all ecosystems in the park from downgrading, and maintaining the recreational areas of the park by promoting activities that do not harm the area. Another goal is the improvement of stormwater management, to improve the issue of rainwater runoff, locals and government representatives implemented an Integrated Stormwater Management Plan (ISMP) in hopes of improving drainage and reducing flooding. The plan also seeks to maintain good communication with all groups involved in the area, provide educational opportunities and information about the park, as well as to maintain the safety of the park. More goals include enhancing native plant community recovery and development by planting at least ten different native species by November 2021, providing additional cover of salmonberry and snowberry to support ecosystems, and planting low-level species to allow sunlight into the site.

==== Restoration Efforts ====
Kanaka Creek Regional Park underwent a successful restoration project done by the University of Victoria in 2022 which included planting a number of native plants to close off an area with unauthorized human activity. This includes unsanctioned trails being created and the unauthorized construction of bike jumps off trail along with other misuse of the park, which lead to a loss of plant life. As part of the project, new fences have been implemented in these areas to discourage the misuse. After the project was completed, the team recommended that there be more work done to educate the public on proper trail usage to maintain the health of the park.

== See also ==
- Kanaka Creek, British Columbia (community adjacent to lower reaches)
- List of protected areas in British Columbia
