= Maple Ridge Secondary School =

Location
- 21911 122 Ave; Maple Ridge, British Columbia, V2X 3X2; Canada; 49.22501°N 122.61508°W

Information
- School type: Public, high school
- School board: School District 42 Maple Ridge-Pitt Meadows
- School number: 4242001
- Principal: Grant, Frend
- Staff: 120
- Grades: 8-12
- Enrollment: 1693 (January 16, 2006)
- Colours: Red, white, gold
- Mascot: Rambo
- Team name: Ramblers
- Website: mapleridgesecondary.ca

Maple Ridge Secondary School is a public high school in Maple Ridge, British Columbia, Canada, part of School District 42 Maple Ridge-Pitt Meadows.

== Academics ==
Maple Ridge Secondary offers academic courses as part of the Advanced Placement (AP) program, although only the English Language & Composition and English Literature & Composition courses have been taught. It was ranked 201st in the Fraser Institute annual ranking of schools in 2004/05. MRSS also offers an Outreach program for students from throughout the district who have fallen behind in their schooling.

== Athletics ==
MRSS sports teams include badminton, basketball, soccer, wrestling, mountain biking, cheerleading, field hockey, swimming, rugby, cross country, track and field, volleyball, water polo, tennis, golf, field lacrosse, and ball hockey.

== Arts ==
MRSS is known within its school district and the province of British Columbia for its Digital Art Academy, which offers students classes in the digital arts. These include creating:

- Art with Photoshop
- Websites
- Sound effects and music
- Short films
- Poster art and cartoon-art with Illustrator and Photoshop
- Programming games using Adobe Director and Flash. MRSS is the only school in School District 42 to offer a certificate of membership to a Digital Art Academy.

== In popular culture ==
- Much of the music video for Likey, by K-pop girl group Twice, was filmed on the school's campus in 2017.
- Lifetime Tv Show, Nobody Dumps My Daughter, featuring Hudson Williams, actor of Heated Rivalry, was filmed on the school grounds.

== Notable alumni ==
- Robert Mundell, 1949.
- Tyler Labine, actor 1996.
- Karina LeBlanc, Member of the Canadian Women's Olympic Soccer Team 2008 and 2012.
- Andrew Ladd, NHL player 2003.
- Larry Walker, 1984, MLB 5x All Star, 1997 National League MVP
- Brandon Yip, NHL player 2003.
- Maggie Coles-Lyster, 2017, Pan Am Games Cyclist
- Megan Charpentier, 2019, Actress
- Taryck Tahid, 2023, youngest player in history to sign a Canadian Premier League contract, Vancouver FC at the age of 16 years and 16 days
- Travis Gillespie, professional lacrosse player and 2 time national champion for limestone university.
