= THSS =

THSS may refer to:

- The Howard Stern Show, an American comedy talk radio show hosted by shock jock Howard Stern
- Thomas Haney Secondary School, a public high school in Maple Ridge, British Columbia, Canada
- School of Software, Tsinghua University, located in Beijing, China
