= Westview Secondary School =

Secondary School in British Columbia

Location
- 20905 Wicklund Ave. Maple Ridge, British Columbia, V2X 8E8; Canada; 49.22408°N 122.64203°W

Information
- School type: Public, high school
- Founded: January 11, 1973
- School board: School District 42 Maple Ridge-Pitt Meadows
- School number: 4242004
- Principal: Cathryn Blanco
- Staff: 68
- Grades: 8-12
- Enrollment: 863 (2023–24)
- Language: English (8-12)/French (8-12)/Spanish (9-12)
- Colours: Blue, White, and Silver
- Mascot: Wildcat Wild Wild west cowboy man shooting brown fighting bull (1986) Wallaby (1973 - 1985)
- Team name: Wildcats
- Website: wss.sd42.ca

Westview Secondary School is a public high school in Maple Ridge, British Columbia. It is part of School District 42 Maple Ridge-Pitt Meadows.

== Description ==
Westview Secondary School educates students in grades 8–12. It also offers honours courses, career preparation programs, and second language classes in French and Spanish.

In 1999, Westfield Secondary was approved for a $3.7-million addition to add 13 classrooms, a gymnasium and special-education rooms, increasing the capacity by 350 to 1,200 students. Westview Secondary facilities were renovated in 2001, creating 16 new classrooms, three gyms (including a weight room and fitness centre), three new computer labs and computer access in all areas of the building, a fully equipped theatre, and a new library.

Westview Secondary School's enrollment in 2023–2024 was 864 students.

== History ==
Westview Secondary School opened to the public in 1973 as SD42's only junior high school.

In 1992, Westview received a $50,000 grant for a five-year support program from Xerox Canada for "legal, health and social counseling services for youngsters who could be heading for a life on the streets".

Westview became a grade 8-12 secondary school in 1995, and graduated its first class in June 1995.

A new program, "Explorations", described as "an integrated program for Grade 10 students, combining English, Social Studies, Physical Education, Career and Personal Planning and a locally developed course called Environmental Studies", was initiated in 2000. The program takes "a practical approach to learning, so students are often outside the classroom, putting up wood duck nests, doing water quality tests at a local creek and studying trees and forestry practices at the University of B.C. Research Forest".

The Fraser Institute named Westview Secondary School the "Most Improved School" in B.C.in 2003.

Westview served 70 international students in 2003, for a high school experience as students with the same classes and same hours as Canadian students. International students attend English as a second language for improved English skills, as well as to understand Canadian culture.

In 2005, Westview Secondary School's automotive students participating in the 2005 BCAA, BCIT and B.C. Ford Dealers' Student Auto Skills Competition finished in the top five at the auto skills show at BCIT.

A new turf field in 2006 allowed school teams, physical education classes and community groups use of the new turf. School officials discussed a possible soccer academy at the school. After its installation, the all-weather field was so successful that Maple Ridge Mayor Gord Robson called for two more fields like it in the district.

In 2007, local credit union Envision supported three educational programs at Westview designed to engage potential school dropouts: the Outdoor Education program combining science and physical education, and outdoor activities like hiking and overnight camping; its Fine Arts program to help students "develop literacy, technology and self-expression skills through drama and other art forms"; and the Trowel Trades program, which teaches "skills like masonry, bricklaying, and drywall installation". Envision provided $10,000 per year for three years to help build the programs.

A 2007 "School Fruit and Vegetable Snack Program" at Westview provided the school with monthly deliveries of "ready-to-eat, fresh, local fruits or vegetables". Westview was one of only five British Columbia secondary schools to participate in the program, which distributed the food through the school's Foods Class.

In 2010, the "Green the Courtyard" garden project engaged students from classes English 9, Communication 11 + 12, Leadership, and Support Connections to convert a previously unused the courtyard to grow edible fruit producing plants. Plans also included engaging Carpentry 11 class to build gazebo-like structure for growing vines.

A totem pole was erected in 2013 to honor the historical Katzie and Kwantlen First Nations that traditionally lived in the territory. The pole includes a wildcat base, representing the school's team mascot, a hummingbird, and a coyote. The coyote was selected for the totem because sometimes a coyote is seen on school grounds.

A $414,000 mechanical upgrade project at Westfield in 2015 provided "46 roof-top heat pumps with gas fired back-up heating", funded by the province's MyEducation BC system.

Westview Secondary student Nash Taylor earned second place in Excel at the 2015 Microsoft Office Specialist World Championship. He had previously won the "best in Canada at Microsoft Office", with an all-expenses paid trip to represent Canada in the Microsoft global skills competition in Dallas.

In 2018, the Canadian Ministry of Advanced Education, Skills and Training invested $1 million to seismically upgrade Westview's facilities.

== Athletics ==
In 2005, Westview offered the following sports: (Fall) Volleyball, Boys Soccer, and Cross Country; (Winter) Badminton, Basketball, and Wrestling; and (Spring) Golf, Rugby, Girls Soccer, and Track and Field.

Westview's current athletics include badminton, basketball, cross country, field hockey, golf, rugby, skiing/snowboarding, soccer, track and field, volleyball, and wrestling.
