= Whonnock Lake =

- Location within Canada
- Location: Maple Ridge, British Columbia, Canada
- Coordinates: 49°12′46″N 122°26′53″W
- Type: natural muskeg lake

Whonnock Lake is a natural muskeg lake. If left alone, it will slowly turn into a peat marsh. The only regular water input is from the north. There is an exit to Whonnock Creek on the south-east side originally closed off by a sandbar (beaver dam) that was replaced in 2008 by a man-made berm and fish channel. This is where the water escapes from the lake to Whonnock Creek. In the past beavers regulated the water level of the lake — now the city does that. Whonnock Lake is a rural-residential neighbourhood in eastern Maple Ridge, British Columbia, Canada, located about 40 miles (64 km) east of Vancouver in the upland area of Whonnock south of the Dewdney Trunk Road. The lake is used as a practice facility for the Ridge Canoe and Kayak Club, and has hosted many sprint kayak and canoe competitions.

== See also ==
- List of lakes of British Columbia
