= District 42 =

District 42 may refer to:

- California's 42nd congressional district
- Maryland Legislative District 42
- Pennsylvania Senate, District 42
- Texas's 42nd House of Representatives district
- School District 42 Maple Ridge-Pitt Meadows
