= Pitt Meadows Secondary School =

Location
- 19438 116B Avenue; Pitt Meadows, British Columbia, V3Y 1G1; Canada; 49.2139°N 122.6825°W

Information
- School type: Public, high school
- Founded: 1961
- School board: School District 42 Maple Ridge-Pitt Meadows
- School number: 4242003
- Principal: Colin Sharpe
- Grades: 8-12
- Enrollment: 1000 (approx) (September, 2014)
- Language: English, French
- Colours: Green, black, white
- Mascot: Marauder
- Team name: Marauders (Air Force)
- Website: pmss.sd42.ca

Pitt Meadows Secondary School (PMSS) is a public high school in Pitt Meadows, British Columbia, part of School District 42 Maple Ridge-Pitt Meadows. The school was founded in 1961 and celebrated its 50th anniversary with an open house on September 30, 2011. It is one of two high schools a part of SD42 that has a French Immersion program from grades 8-12.

== Community involvement ==
Pitt Meadows Secondary has a work experience program. Many students make use of the school career centre and volunteer in the community. Students dedicate thousands of hours of their time volunteering at local elementary schools, hospitals, events hosted by the City of Pitt Meadows, and summer camps. Local organizations have Pitt Meadows students to donate time to fundraisers and events. Students have the opportunity to participate in hands-on work experience in a variety of businesses so that they can gain employable skills prior to graduation. Within the school, leadership students plan fun activities for students such as spirit week, grade eight orientation day, the Terry Fox Run, and special assemblies.

== Fine arts ==
The school has a music program which includes a band and choir. Both groups have the opportunity to participate in field trips and special performances throughout the year. Drama students are involved in classes as well as after-school productions. They typically perform at an annual play, the annual Festival of Scenes, and an improv night which is a fundraiser for the food bank. The school has a yearbook club made of students and a teacher to self-produce/photograph the book.

== Home economics ==
Foods students have been involved in the creation of a community garden and are learning to grow and harvest food. Many students choose to participate in Foods Studies, Textiles, and Family Studies courses.

== Viking Productions ==
This is a class for learning how to use multimedia applications on computers for various projects. 2008–2009 was the first year that this new set of courses ran. Students in the course are involved with creating websites, hosting radio shows, broadcasting television shows, and making music. As of 2015 this class is no longer offered at Pitt Meadows Secondary. Its spiritual successor is Information Technology or Computer Science.

== Shop classes ==
The school has a variety of shop classes such as metalwork, woodwork, metal art, wood art and automotive mechanics.

== Murals ==
In 2006, the school received a series of murals on the front side of the building. These paintings depict a Viking marauder (the school's mascot), a Heron (the official bird of the city), and the school's coat of arms. The coat of arms contains a saying in Latin "Amor Doctrinae Floreat" which translates to "Let the Love of Learning Flourish". There are also two large collages on either side of the school's main gymnasium. One mural depicts a large marauder and the other is a blue heron on a mound of dirt representing the city's colour, terrain, and native bird. A third mural has recently been added of a large Viking ship on the back side of the school. The ship contains the signatures of the 2008–2009 graduation class.

== Sports ==
Pitt Meadows has numerous teams and programs, including ultimate, ball hockey, soccer, volleyball, golf, and track and field. The school's most prominent sport is basketball with a very competitive senior boys team that was coached by Mr. Rich Goulet from 1979 until the end of 2017, a total of 38 years.

== Provincial championships ==
AA basketball:

- 1983

AAA basketball:

- 1989 vs. Maple Ridge Secondary
- 2000 vs. Terry Fox Senior Secondary

Tier 2 Football:

- 2016 vs. Eric Hamber Secondary

== Notable alumni ==
- Greg Moore, Race car driver
- Brendan Morrison, Professional hockey player and member of the famed West Coast Express line
- Molly Parker, Professional actress
- Patrick Wiercioch, Professional hockey player
- Giovanni Manu, NFL offensive lineman for the Detroit Lions
- Malcolm Williams, Professional Canadian football player
- Mike Kubat, writer for 33 episodes of Ed, Edd n Eddy
