= Port Hammond =

Coordinates: 49°12′00″N 122°39′00″W

Port Hammond, commonly known as Hammond, is a community on the Fraser River within the city of Maple Ridge, British Columbia, Canada, near its border with the City of Pitt Meadows and just east of the Golden Ears Bridge.

== History ==
The town's name derives from its two original settlers, William and John Hammond, a civil engineer and a farmer respectively, who with a Mrs. E.H. Mohun owned the property that became the community, which they received as a Crown Grant in 1862. The term "Port" was appended to the name in the course of the town becoming the westward terminus of the Canadian Pacific Railway during its construction, prior to its extension westward to Burrard Inlet. The brothers Hammond had struck a deal with the CPR, trading land for track right-of-way, station and yards on the condition that their townsite be the location of the first station in Maple Ridge. It was also known as Hammond's Landing, as it served as the steamship and mail port for all CPR shipping from New Westminster and Victoria and the brothers had ambitions of it becoming a major deep-water port. With the railway came Chinese labourers and merchants, some of whom stayed on after railway construction to work on farms or as servants, with their residential area being in the vicinity of 207th St and Maple Crescent, which is also the area of the grove of maple trees from which Maple Ridge's named was derived. Following World War I, part of Hammond became known as "Swede Row" due to the presence of a community of Swedish millworkers and loggers.

From 1910 onwards, Port Hammond was the site of a major sawmill and served as a company town for its employees; this mill in 1946 became controlled by British Columbia Forest Products, then one of the province's largest milling concerns. The CPR Mainline runs through the community, with most of the townsite grid between it and the Fraser River, and therefore outside the main dyke protecting settlement from the Fraser freshet.

Graveyard Indian Reserve No. 5, 0.40 ha., on the north side of Hammond and under the aegis of the Katzie First Nation, was bought from the Hammond brothers in order to provide a cemetery for Indians and Chinese, who were excluded from the other graveyard in the area, which was for whites although some Kanakas had been buried there.

== Film location ==
Hammond is a popular film location and TV series like Arrow and The Flash film in the Maple Meadows Business Park.

== Sports ==
Baseball has always been a popular sport in Port Hammond and on July 30, 2016, the City of Maple Ridge unveiled a public art display titled “Play Ball” at the Hammond Stadium to pay homage to the extensive history of baseball. Hammond Stadium Park is also a year-round training facility for minor baseball.

The sports enthusiast can take in a full day of activities in the Port Hammond area including soccer, baseball, golf, and cycling.
