= Kanaka Creek, British Columbia =

Kanaka Creek
- Location of Kanaka Creek in British Columbia
- Coordinates: 49°12′02″N 122°35′09″W
- Country: Canada
- Province: British Columbia
- Area codes: 250, 778

Kanaka Creek is an historic rural residential area located within Maple Ridge, British Columbia, Canada, along the banks of the creek of the same name just east of the district's main town and commercial core of Haney. Just east is Albion and immediately across the Fraser River is Derby or "Old Fort Langley", upstream from which and opposite Albion is Fort Langley. Kanaka Creek was settled by Hawaiian natives in the employ of the Hudson's Bay Company, known as Kanakas, often with local indigenous, usually Kwantlen, wives. Once a thriving community linked closely to the affairs of the fort, like the rancherie outside Fort Vancouver, Kanaka Creek dwindled somewhat when the fort was located further upstream, although some of the original families stayed on for decades. The area has long since been subdivided and is a suburban neighbourhood now, with Kanaka Creek Road, along the creek's west bank, the main arterial, which like the creek runs generally northeast, finally becoming 232nd Street to connect to the Dewdney Trunk Road. Upstream, to the northeast, is Kanaka Creek Regional Park and street connections to Webster's Corners and 240th Street. Although mostly suburban the neighbourhood retains a greenbelt quality because of the protection of the creek by its park and as a salmon spawning stream, and there are still farms operating in some parts of the area.

== See also ==
- The Kanaka Rancherie, a settlement of Native Hawaiian migrant workers in Vancouver
