= Thomas Haney Secondary School =

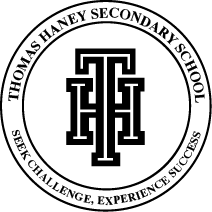

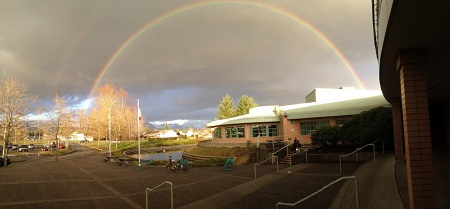

Location
- 23000 116 Ave; Maple Ridge, British Columbia, V2X 0T8; Canada; 49°12′42.9″N 122°34′53.8″W

Information
- Former name: Thomas Haney Centre
- School type: Public, high school
- Motto: "Seek Challenge, Experience Success"
- Founded: 1992
- School board: School District 42 Maple Ridge-Pitt Meadows
- School number: 4242038
- Principal: Colin Sharpe
- Vice Principal: Lisa Kania
- Vice Principal: Steve Kater
- Staff: 89
- Grades: 8–12
- Enrollment: 1161.5 (2021)
- Capacity: 1200
- Language: English
- Area: Haney, or as later known as: Maple Ridge (to date)
- Colors: Burgundy and Grey
- Mascot: Thor
- Team name: Thunder
- Website: secondary.sd42.ca/thss/

Thomas Haney Secondary School is a self directed learning public high school in Maple Ridge, British Columbia, Canada, under the authority of School District 42 Maple Ridge-Pitt Meadows. Athletic organizations within the school are known as the Thomas Haney Thunder.

== Clubs ==
School clubs include the Model United Nations Club, an ice and ball hockey program, the Student Council, Gardening Club, Thunder Tech Robotics Club, Extreme Math Club, World scholars club and Newspaper club. (For a full list, click here) The Model United Nations club allows students to partake in numerous United Nations simulations across the year. Several Thomas Haney students were award winners. The eSports team is run by Mark Biggar and Todd Goodman. The two teachers, along with an arsenal of students, host a LARP (Live Action Role Play) at the school annually.

== Self directed learning ==
The school features a self-directed learning program that will have students spend the majority of their time at the school Outside of their classes, in open study areas known as Great Hall. Students are encouraged to be self motivated and to decide to what subjects to allocate their open study time. The courses at Thomas Haney consist of "Learning Guides", which, in most cases, are to be completed at the student's own pace. All students are also assigned a Teacher Advisor, commonly known as TA, whom they will see every morning during teacher advisory time. A student's TA will act as a guide and mentor to the student, helping them manage their schoolwork, and helping guide them through their school career.

== Pods and programs ==
The Peak Performance Pod (often referred to as Peak), is an athletic program requiring try-outs. Peak was developed for students heavily involved in sports or other athletic activities. Peak students travel together, learning core subjects as a group. The Peak Program helps encourage students to stay active and healthy long into adulthood.

Thomas Haney Equestrian Academy is a program for students interested in Horses and equestrian sports.

== Notable alumni ==
- Jonathan Scott
- Drew Scott
- Madeline Merlo
