= Kanaka Gulch =

Valley in Oregon, United States

Coordinates: 42°03′57″N 123°06′34″W

Kanaka Gulch is a valley in the U.S. state of Oregon.

Kanaka Gulch was named for the Kanaka people who were employed in the local mining industry.
