= Kanak (disambiguation) =

The Kanak are the Melanesian inhabitants of New Caledonia.

Kanak may also refer to:

- Kanak Peak, a mountain in Antarctica
- Orang Kanaq, a Proto-Malay Orang Asli group of people also known as Kanaq or Kanak people
- Kanake or Kanaker, a derogatory word used in German-speaking countries
- Kanak Chanpa Chakma (born 1963), Bangladeshi artist
- Jaren Kanak (born 2004), American football player
- Katharine Kanak (born c. 1975), American atmospheric scientist

== See also ==
- Kanaka (disambiguation)
- Baduy people, a branch of the Sundanese people also known as Kanekes people
- Canuck /kəˈnʌk/, a slang term for a Canadian
- Qaanaaq, a town in Avannaata, Greenland
