= Giovanni Manu =

Tongan and Canadian player of American football (born 2001)

No. 59 – Detroit Lions
- Position: Offensive tackle
- Roster status: Non-football injury

Personal information
- Born: January 26, 2001 (age 25); Nuku'alofa, Tonga
- Listed height: 6 ft 8 in (2.03 m)
- Listed weight: 350 lb (159 kg)

Career information
- High school: Pitt Meadows (Pitt Meadows, British Columbia)
- University: UBC (2018–2023)
- NFL draft: 2024: 4th round, 126th overall pick
- CFL draft: 2024: 5th round, 46th overall pick

Career history
- Detroit Lions (2024–present)

Awards and highlights
- 2× Second-team All-Canadian (2022, 2023)

Career NFL statistics as of 2025
- Games played: 4
- Games started: 1
- Stats at Pro Football Reference

Werner "Giovanni" Manu (born January 26, 2001) is a Tongan-Canadian professional American football offensive tackle for the Detroit Lions of the National Football League (NFL). He played Canadian football in U Sports for the UBC Thunderbirds. Manu was selected by the Lions in the fourth round of the 2024 NFL draft.

== Early life ==
Manu was born on January 26, 2001, in Tonga. He moved to British Columbia in Canada to live with an aunt at the age of 11. He entered the Pitt Meadows Secondary School and tried out football soon after. He also played basketball.

== College career ==
Manu enrolled at the University of British Columbia in 2018 and redshirted his first year on the UBC Thunderbirds football team. He won a starting role on the offensive line in 2019 as the team went 2–6. The 2020 season was cancelled due to the COVID-19 pandemic, and Manu then started all seven games at left tackle in 2021. He started games at both left tackle and left guard in 2022 and was selected second-team All-Canadian. He and fellow Thunderbirds offensive lineman Theo Benedet were both ranked as among the top prospects for the 2023 CFL draft, but opted to return to UBC for a final season. He repeated as a second-team All-Canadian choice in the 2023 selection and helped UBC make their first appearance in the Vanier Cup since 2015.

== Professional career ==
Pre-draft measurables
Height	Weight	Arm length	Hand span	Wingspan	40-yard dash	10-yard split	20-yard split	20-yard shuttle	Three-cone drill	Vertical jump	Broad jump	Bench press
6 ft 7 3/8 in (2.02 m)	352 lb (160 kg)	34 5/8 in (0.88 m)	10 1/2 in (0.27 m)	6 ft 11 in (2.11 m)	5.07 s	1.81 s	2.87 s	4.81 s	8.29 s	33.5 in (0.85 m)	8 ft 11 in (2.72 m)	23 reps
All values from Pro Day

In addition to being a top-ranked prospect for the 2024 CFL draft, Manu also received attention as a potential selection in the 2024 NFL draft, receiving praise for his skills and size. Manu was selected by the Detroit Lions in the fourth round (126th overall) of the NFL draft and by the Winnipeg Blue Bombers in the fifth round (46th overall) of the CFL draft. He became the first player from UBC ever to be selected in the NFL draft.
