= Travis Gillespie =

Canadian lacrosse player

Personal information
- Nationality: Canadian
- Born: September 14, 1979 (age 47) New Westminster, British Columbia
- Height: 6 ft 0 in (183 cm)
- Weight: 215 lb (98 kg; 15 st 5 lb)

Sport
- Position: Defense
- Shoots: Left
- NLL draft: 4th overall, 2002; Columbus Landsharks
- NLL team Former teams: San Jose Stealth; Columbus Landsharks; Calgary Roughnecks
- Pro career: 2003–

Travis Gillespie (born September 14, 1979 in New Westminster, British Columbia) is a lacrosse player for the Washington Stealth of the National Lacrosse League.

With his father coaching, Gillespie began playing lacrosse at four. Growing up in Maple Ridge, BC, he excelled at many sports and played hockey, basketball, and soccer, in addition to box and field lacrosse. Travis, prior to attending Limestone College in South Carolina on an athletic scholarship for lacrosse, had been on 12 provincial lacrosse teams, the Canadian team, the British Columbia Selects, and had been the Field Lacrosse Provincial All-Star Goal Tender. Travis also played box lacrosse with the Orangeville Northmen of the Ontario Jr. A League

Travis Gillespie is a two-time Division 2 NCAA champion with the Limestone College Saints where, in 2000, 2001, and 2002, he won three All-Conference, three All-American, and one Academic All-American awards. Gillespie was a member of Team Canada's U19 team where he won a silver medal while playing bigstick. In 2000, Travis also won a Mann Cup (Canadian National box champions) with the Coquitlam Adanacs and has spent the past four seasons playing in the National Lacrosse League after being selected with the Columbus Landsharks fifth overall pick. Currently, Travis is coaching the New Westminster U17 and running a development team in Vancouver for players wishing to play in the NCAA. Travis is in his second year coaching the Lacrosse Nation camps. He was appointed Head Coach of Taiwan Lacrosse Association (TWLA) since 2015 and has been working intensively with TWLA to develop players as well as the lacrosse community in Taiwan

== NLL career ==
Travis Gillespie was the #4 draft pick by the Columbus Landsharks out of Limestone College in the 2002 National Lacrosse League entry draft.

Gillespie then found his way to the Arizona Sting. In October 2004, the Sting traded him to the Calgary Roughnecks who signed him to a one-year contract. In 2005, the Roughnecks re-signed him to a two-year contract. In July, 2008, the Boston Blazers traded for Gillespie and then, as part of a three-team deal, traded him to the San Jose Stealth. The Stealth then signed him to a one-year contract.

== Statistics ==
=== NLL ===
		Regular Season						Playoffs
Season	Team	GP	G	A	Pts	LB	PIM	GP	G	A	Pts	LB	PIM
2003	Columbus	16	4	8	12	131	14	--	--	--	--	--	--
2004	Arizona	13	2	6	8	67	12	--	--	--	--	--	--
2005	Calgary	8	3	5	8	41	11	1	0	0	0	5	0
2006	Calgary	9	4	7	11	48	13	0	0	0	0	0	0
NLL totals		46	13	26	39	287	50	1	0	0	0	5	0
