= Kanaka Shri =

- Civilian award
- Awarded for: Recognize individuals who contribute to the promotion of values and literature of Kanakadasa.
- Sponsored by: Government of Karnataka
- Reward: 500,000 Indian Rupees
- First award: 2008
- Final award: 2015

Highlights
- First winner: Prof. Sudhakar
- Last winner: Dr. Swamirao Kulkarni

The Kanaka Shri is an award instituted by the Government of Karnataka to recognize individuals who contribute to the promotion of the values and literature of Kanakadasa.

== The Award ==
The award carries a citation, a shawl and a cash prize worth half a million Indian rupees.

== Winners ==
- 2015: Dr. Swamirao Kulkarni
- 2014: Prof. A V Navada
- 2013: Prof. Krishna Kolhar Kulkarni
- 2011: Prof. Jyothi Hosur
- 2010: Dr. H. J. Lakkappa Gowda
- 2009: Dr. T. N. Nagarathna
- 2008: Prof. Sudhakar
