= Kanaka (given name) =

Kanaka is an Indian given name. The Sanskrit word kanaka has the primary meaning "gold". Notable persons with the name include:

- Kanaka (actress) (born 1973), South Indian film actress
- Kanaka Dasa (1509 – 1609), Kannada-language poet, philosopher, musician and composer
- Kanaka Ha Ma (born 1964), Kannada-language writer
- Kanaka Herath, Shri Lankan politician
- Kanaka Srinivasan, Indian classical dancer
- T. S. Kanaka (born 1932), Indian neurosurgeon
