= Katzie First Nation =

First Nation in British Columbia, Canada

Katzie First Nation q̓ic̓əy̓
- First Nation
- Seal
- Etymology: From the Hunʼqumiʼnum name q̓ic̓əy̓, meaning "land of the moss"
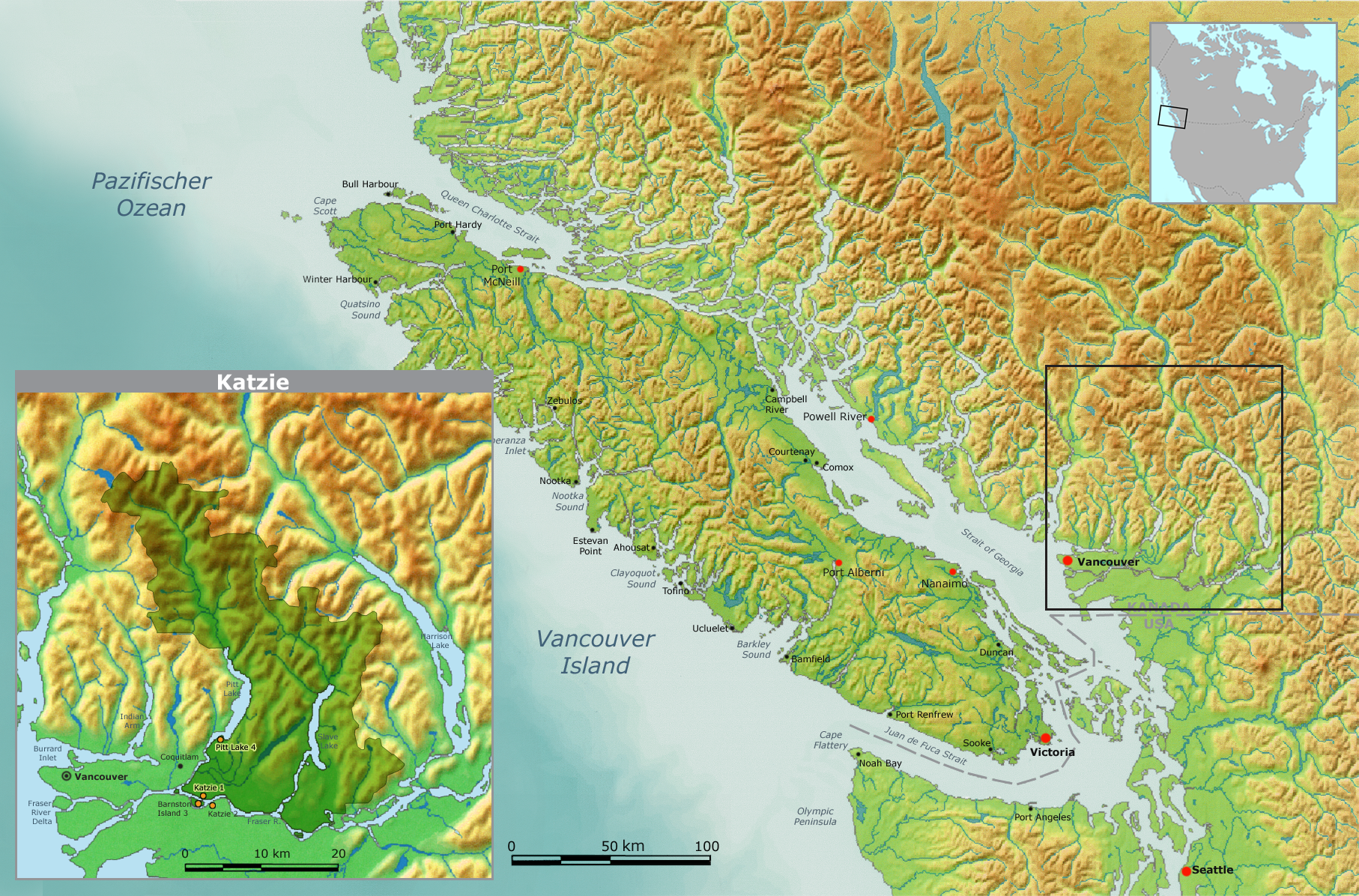
- Traditional territory of the Katzie First Nation

- Location in British Columbia
- Country: Canada
- Province: British Columbia

Government
  - Type: Band council
  - Chief: Grace George
  - Councillors: Lisa Adams; Rick Bailey; David Kenworthy

Area
  - Total: 3.41 km^{2} (1.32 sq mi)

Population (2024)
  - Total: 563
  - On reserve: 310
  - Off reserve: 253
- Time zone: UTC-8 (PST)
  - Summer (DST): UTC-7 (PDT)
- Ethnic group: Stó꞉lō
- Languages: Hunʼqumiʼnum; English
- Reserves: Katzie 1 (main); Katzie 2; Barnston Island 3; Pitt Lake 4; Graveyard 5
- Website: katzie.ca

Katzie First Nation (Hunʼqumiʼnum: q̓ic̓əy̓) is a First Nation whose traditional territory lies in the Lower Fraser Valley of British Columbia, Canada. According to their oral tradition, the Katzie people are the descendants of the Oeʼlecten and Swaneset communities, two of five established by the Creator in present-day Greater Vancouver.

== History ==
=== Oral history and etymology ===
According to their oral tradition, the Katzie people are descendants of the five communities established by the Creator in what is now known as Greater Vancouver. The Creator assigned a chief to lead each community: Oeʼlecten (θéłəctən) at Pitt Lake, Swaneset at Sheridan Hill (in Pitt Meadows), Xwoeʼpecten at Port Hammond (in Maple Ridge), Cʼsimlenexw at Point Grey (in Vancouver), and Smakwec at Point Roberts (in Washington, US). The Katzie people are primarily the descendants of Swaneset and Oeʼlecten, while the descendants of Xwoeʼpecten, Cʼsimlenexw, and Smakwec became the Kwantlen, Musqueam, and Snokomish peoples, respectively. The Snokomish people were wiped out by a smallpox epidemic in the 18th century.

It is said that Swaneset, at the behest of the Creator, shaped the land of his area so that it would be abundant in berry and root crops and thus suitable for human life. He then travelled to the sky and returned to Earth with a sky wife who instructed the people of the area to pile up moss to form the foundation for a village site. She later released eulachon into the Fraser River (Stó꞉lō) and taught the people how to catch and prepare the fish for consumption. Within Swaneset's lifetime, the Katzie community had grown to 12 separate villages. Swaneset is said to have secured an abundance of sockeye salmon for the Katzie people through his second marriage to the daughter of the chief of the "sockeye people".

"Katzie" is an anglicization of the Hunʼqumiʼnum name q̓ic̓əy̓, which means "land of the moss" or "multi-coloured moss". The Katzie people's oral tradition credits the name to Swaneset.

=== Treaty process ===
Katzie Nation is negotiating their land treaty independently, and are not part of either Sto:lo tribal councils (the Sto:lo Nation and the Stó:lō Tribal Council).

=== Golden Ears Bridge agreement ===
As the new Golden Ears Bridge was in Katzie territory, the nation signed a Benefit Agreement with TransLink in September 2004 to establish the responsibilities of both parties.

== Territory and governance ==
Traditional Katzie territory includes the entire Pitt watershed, including the Alouette watershed, the Fraser River, lands adjacent to Point Roberts, and lands between the Fraser and Boundary Bay. There are approximately 592 members of Katzie First Nation (their Indian Act-mandated government), and 302 are currently living on their five reserves.

=== Reserves ===
Katzie Nation manages the affairs of residents of five reserves assigned to the Katzie, focused on the area of Pitt Meadows, where the band headquarters are located. Other reserves are on Barnston Island and at Yorkson Creek in Langley, British Columbia. These reserves are:

- Katzie 1, one mile west of Port Hammond on right (north) bank of the Fraser River, 44.10 ha.49°12′00″N 122°40′00″W
- Katzie 2, opposite Port Hammond on the left (south) bank of the Fraser River, 23.10 ha.49°12′00″N 122°39′00″W
- Barnston Island 3, south shore of Barnston Island, 54.6 ha.49°11′00″N 122°42′00″W
- Pitt Lake 4, at south end of Pitt Lake, at outlet into Pitt River, 218.50 ha.49°21′00″N 122°36′00″W
- Graveyard 5, one mile north of Port Hammond, 0.40 ha. 49°13′00″N 122°39′00″W

== Population ==
As of February 2024, the band's population was 563, of whom 310 live on-reserve.

== Language ==
həṅq̓əmín̓əḿ, the downriver dialect of Halkomelem, is still spoken by Katzie peoples despite colonization attempts (including the Canadian Residential School System). Halkomelem is one of the Coast Salish, or Salishan languages.
