= Webster's Corners =

Community in British Columbia, Canada

Coordinates: 49°13′00″N 122°31′00″W

Webster's Corners is a community in British Columbia, located northeast of Albion in Maple Ridge, British Columbia. Webster's Corners was founded by James Murray Webster who was born in Aberdeen, Scotland. James Webster arrived in 1883 and was the first postmaster. He named the settlement after himself.
