= Albion, British Columbia =

Neighbourhood in Maple Ridge, British Columbia, Canada

Coordinates: 49°11′00″N 122°33′00″W

Albion, British Columbia is a neighbourhood in Maple Ridge, British Columbia and is one of several small towns incorporated within the municipality at its creation. It is the oldest non-indigenous community of the district's settlements, and is only slightly younger than Fort Langley, adjacent across the Fraser River, and Kanaka Creek, which is just to the west and lies along the creek of the same name. Its official definition is the area bounded by the Fraser River, Kanaka Way, and 240th Street, but in its historic sense it means the community centred on and flanking 240th Street and adjoining areas along the Fraser River waterfront and around the Maple Ridge Fairgrounds, while along Kanaka Way and also on the near bank of Kanaka Creek, the creek, is historically the community of Kanaka Creek. Burgeoning newer home construction east of 240th Street near the Lougheed Highway is also often referred to as part of Albion.

== History ==
Samuel Robertson and his Indigenous wife Julia were the first "European" settlers, he establishing the first fruit orchard in British Columbia two years before he permanently relocated from across the river at Fort Langley. This area was originally known as East Haney, and was renamed Albion in 1907. Peter Baker (originally Boulanger) was another early European settler; his name was originally used for what is now 240th Street.

Trains did not stop in Albion until train personnel set a precedent by permitting one Albion resident "whose weight was not to be lightly estimated" to alight there and in this way save a long walk through a stormy evening from the stop in Haney. The next week several men demanded the same privilege, and the Albion stop on the railway was created.

Sawmills, canneries and fishboats featured in Albion's economy, and River Road, which runs between the Canadian Pacific Railway tracks and the river, has been a mixed industrial area for all of Albion's existence since the coming of the railway in the 1880s. Farmland on the north side of the highway and semi-wild green fields and trees that typified the old rural community are succumbing to suburban sprawl. Langley Indian Reserve No. 5, which includes a native cemetery, is just east of Albion on the north side of the Fraser. It is one of several reserves under the jurisdiction of the Kwantlen First Nation, whose main reserve is across the Fraser from Albion on McMillan Island in Fort Langley.

Albion Community Hall

Albion Hall was built in 1923 by the Albion Community Association. It was bought by the municipality and demolished in 2011. Speaking of the hall, one proponent, looking back several decades, said:

"The people of Albion didn't travel very far afield but took pleasure in getting together with one another. Of necessity their lives were lived within walking distance of their homes. The Albion Hall was a result of this desire to get together in a place where transportation would not be a necessity.":

== Features ==
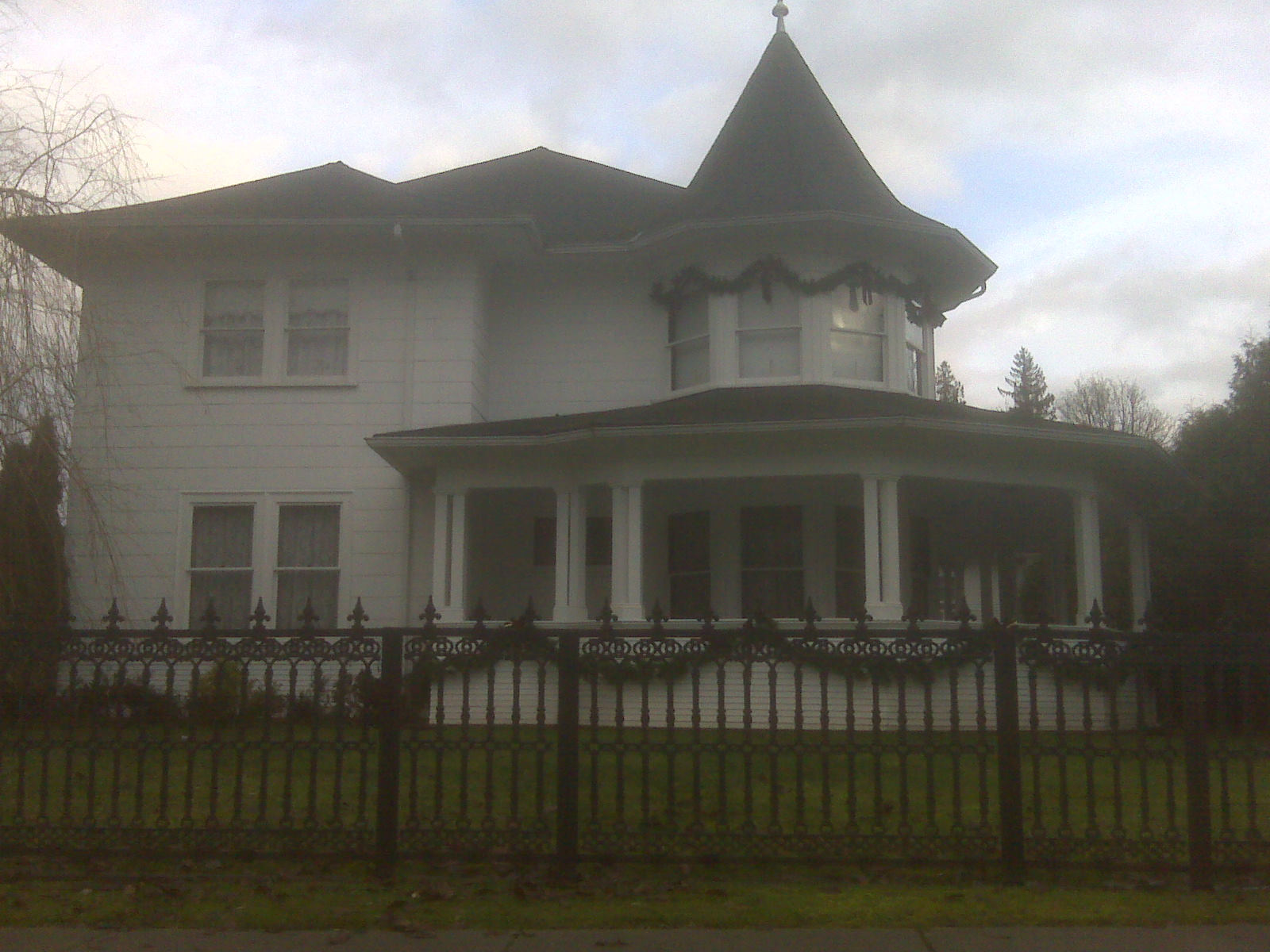
the historic Hill house on 240th Street

Albion was the location of the free Albion Ferry terminal which, until completion of the tolled Golden Ears Bridge in 2009, connected Maple Ridge to Langley via ferry across the Fraser River. The Albion Fairgrounds draw people from other neighbourhoods for the Maple Ridge Country Fest in July. Albion Park with picnic area and some sports facilities and trails is located on 104th Avenue. The Hill House, a 4,000-square-foot (370 m^{2}) 1912 Edwardian style landmark in four storeys, is located on 240th just north of Lougheed Highway.

== Jackson Park ==
A new park is about to be added to the features of this neighbourhood, as 39 acres of rolling hills in the former John Jackson (a.k.a. Jak Huovari) farm were voted into parkland by Maple Ridge council in December 2010. This is in exchange for approval of 112 new homes on another portion of the former farm. Uses for the park acreage are yet to be determined but could include a replacement for the 1923 Albion Hall.

== "The Vinyl Monster" ==
Newer homes are filling the former farm spaces in Albion

At one time Albion was more remote and rural. Consistent with the rapid expansion of this neighbourhood in recent years, growth (likened to a "vinyl monster", a reference to the exterior finish of many newer area homes in an urban development which is spreading over the landscape), shopping, and crowded elementary school facilities are among issues which have motivated discussion.

== Schools ==
Albion is served by School District 42 Maple Ridge-Pitt Meadows. Albion Elementary and Samuel Robertson Technical Secondary schools serve neighbourhood families. Samuel Robertson, named after the early settler, also entices students from other neighbourhoods because of its technical focus.

== See also ==
- Whonnock, British Columbia
- New Albion
