= Maple Ridge, British Columbia =

Maple Ridge
- City
- City of Maple Ridge
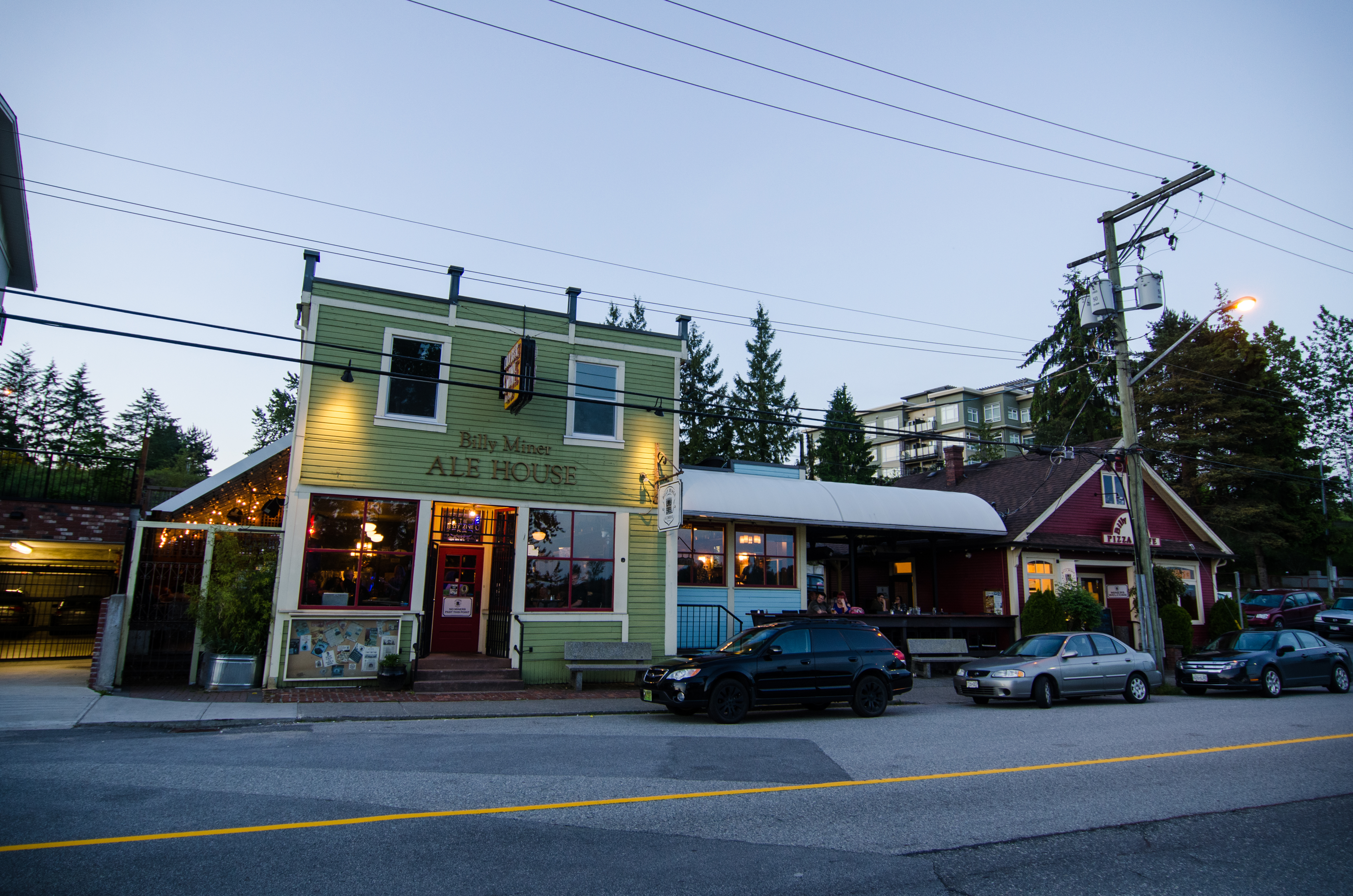
- Port Haney

- Flag Logo
- Nickname: "Ridge"
- Mottoes: "Rivers of bounty, Peaks of gold" or "Deep Roots, Greater Heights"
- Location of Maple Ridge in Metro Vancouver
- Coordinates: 49°13′N 122°36′W
- Country: Canada
- Province: British Columbia
- Regional district: Metro Vancouver
- Incorporation: September 12, 1874 (district municipality)
- September 12, 2014 (city)

Government
  - Type: Mayor-council government
  - Body: City of Maple Ridge Council
  - Mayor: Jerry Kok
  - City Council: List: Judy Dueck; Bob D'Eith; Chelsa Meadus; Mike Morden; Korleen Carreras; Andrew Laity
  - MP: Marc Dalton
  - MLA: Lawrence Mok; Lisa Beare

Area
  - Land: 267.82 km^{2} (103.41 sq mi)
- Elevation: 80 m (260 ft)

Population (2021)
  - Total: 90,990
  - Estimate (2026): 111,000
  - Density: 339.7/km^{2} (880/sq mi)
- Time zone: UTC−07:00 (BC Pacific Time)
- Forward sortation area: V2W – V2X, V4R
- Area codes: 604, 778, 236, 672
- Website: mapleridge.ca

Maple Ridge is a city in British Columbia, Canada. It is located in the northeastern section of Greater Vancouver between the Fraser River and the Golden Ears, a group of mountain summits that constitute the southernmost portion of the Garibaldi Ranges of the Coast Mountains. Maple Ridge's population in 2021 was 90,990. Its downtown core area is referred to as Haney.

== History ==
Maple Ridge was incorporated as a district municipality on September 12, 1874. It covered an area of 33,000 acres (130 km^{2}) yet was home to only approximately 50 families. Maple Ridge is British Columbia's fifth-oldest municipality (after New Westminster, Victoria, Langley, and Chilliwack). From the creation of British Columbia's regional districts in 1965 until the expansion of Metro Vancouver in 1995, it was part of the now-defunct Dewdney-Alouette Regional District with the City of Pitt Meadows and District of Mission and other north-side communities east to Chehalis. Maple Ridge has been part of Metro Vancouver since 1995.

On March 26, 2014, Maple Ridge residents voted to change the community's status from district municipality to city. Subsequently, Maple Ridge Council submitted its request for a status change to the Minister of Community, Sport and Cultural Development. The status change became official on September 12, 2014, which coincided with Maple Ridge's 140th anniversary of municipal incorporation.

== Geography ==
=== Communities ===
Maple Ridge is made up of several different historical areas, including:

- Albion
- Haney (which is now also the downtown area of Maple Ridge)
- Iron Mountain
- Kanaka Creek
- Port Hammond
- Ruskin
- Silver Valley
- Thornhill
- Webster's Corners
- Whonnock
- Yennadon

Some of these areas are identified with a cultural group. For instance, Albion and Webster's Corners are represented by the many Finnish families that settled in the area. Port Hammond is known for its small cottage-like mill houses originally built by the local mill to house its workers, Ruskin is the location of a community hall of the Sons of Norway, although the area was founded by English followers of John Ruskin, and Kanaka Creek originally was a community for Kanaka employees of Fort Langley.

Port Haney, located adjacent to the Fraser River to the southwest of downtown Haney, and the site of the West Coast Express commuter rail station, is a heritage district created to protect some of the remaining buildings from earlier times. In addition to buildings already on-site when this was the steamboat landing as well as the CPR station, other heritage buildings from around the City of Maple Ridge were relocated to Port Haney to preserve them and enhance the heritage flavour of the location.

=== Climate ===
Maple Ridge exhibits an oceanic climate (Köppen Cfb)

Climate data for Maple Ridge Kanaka Creek
Month	Jan	Feb	Mar	Apr	May	Jun	Jul	Aug	Sep	Oct	Nov	Dec	Year
Record high °C (°F)	14.5 (58.1)	20.0 (68.0)	25.5 (77.9)	29.5 (85.1)	31.0 (87.8)	34.0 (93.2)	36.5 (97.7)	34.5 (94.1)	35.5 (95.9)	27.5 (81.5)	16.0 (60.8)	13.5 (56.3)	36.5 (97.7)
Mean daily maximum °C (°F)	5.0 (41.0)	7.8 (46.0)	10.9 (51.6)	14.9 (58.8)	17.9 (64.2)	20.5 (68.9)	23.8 (74.8)	24.1 (75.4)	21.1 (70.0)	14.1 (57.4)	8.1 (46.6)	4.6 (40.3)	14.4 (57.9)
Daily mean °C (°F)	2.5 (36.5)	4.0 (39.2)	6.5 (43.7)	9.6 (49.3)	12.5 (54.5)	15.2 (59.4)	17.7 (63.9)	17.8 (64.0)	15.0 (59.0)	10.0 (50.0)	5.4 (41.7)	2.4 (36.3)	9.9 (49.8)
Mean daily minimum °C (°F)	0.0 (32.0)	0.1 (32.2)	1.9 (35.4)	4.3 (39.7)	7.1 (44.8)	9.9 (49.8)	11.7 (53.1)	11.6 (52.9)	8.9 (48.0)	5.9 (42.6)	2.8 (37.0)	0.2 (32.4)	5.4 (41.7)
Record low °C (°F)	−17 (1)	−13.5 (7.7)	−9 (16)	−2.5 (27.5)	−1 (30)	2.5 (36.5)	5.0 (41.0)	5.0 (41.0)	1.0 (33.8)	−6 (21)	−13 (9)	−17.5 (0.5)	−17.5 (0.5)
Average precipitation mm (inches)	275.8 (10.86)	146.1 (5.75)	174.3 (6.86)	144.1 (5.67)	132.5 (5.22)	90.0 (3.54)	59.4 (2.34)	63.3 (2.49)	82.5 (3.25)	189.0 (7.44)	308.2 (12.13)	236.7 (9.32)	1,901.9 (74.88)
Average rainfall mm (inches)	252.4 (9.94)	138.2 (5.44)	167.9 (6.61)	144.0 (5.67)	132.4 (5.21)	90.0 (3.54)	59.4 (2.34)	63.3 (2.49)	82.5 (3.25)	188.9 (7.44)	301.8 (11.88)	218.6 (8.61)	1,839.4 (72.42)
Average snowfall cm (inches)	23.4 (9.2)	7.9 (3.1)	6.4 (2.5)	0.1 (0.0)	0.1 (0.0)	0.0 (0.0)	0.0 (0.0)	0.0 (0.0)	0.0 (0.0)	0.1 (0.0)	6.4 (2.5)	18.1 (7.1)	62.5 (24.6)
Average precipitation days (≥ 0.2 mm)	21.0	15.4	20.0	17.7	16.0	13.4	9.0	8.1	9.1	16.8	21.3	20.5	188.1
Average rainy days (≥ 0.2 mm)	19.9	14.6	19.4	17.7	16.0	13.4	9.0	8.1	9.1	16.8	20.9	19.1	184
Average snowy days (≥ 0.2 cm)	4.1	2.0	1.6	0.05	0.05	0.0	0.0	0.0	0.0	0.05	1.3	3.6	12.75
Source: Environment Canada

== Demographics ==
In the 2021 Census of Population conducted by Statistics Canada, Maple Ridge had a population of 90,990 living in 33,103 of its 34,254 total private dwellings, a change of 10.6% from its 2016 population of 82,256. With a land area of 267.82 km^{2} (103.41 sq mi), it had a population density of 339.7/km^{2} (879.9/sq mi) in 2021.

=== Ethnicity ===
Panethnic groups in the City of Maple Ridge (2001−2021)
Panethnic group	2021		2016		2011		2006		2001	
Panethnic group	Pop.	%	Pop.	%	Pop.	%	Pop.	%	Pop.	%
European (Note: Statistic includes all persons that did not make up part of a visible minority or an indigenous identity.)	66,230	73.7%	65,040	80.33%	63,550	84.58%	58,970	86.52%	55,795	89.44%
East Asian (Note: Statistic includes total responses of "Chinese", "Korean", and "Japanese" under visible minority section on census.)	5,225	5.81%	3,750	4.63%	2,800	3.73%	2,545	3.73%	1,760	2.82%
South Asian	4,245	4.72%	2,480	3.06%	1,785	2.38%	1,675	2.46%	1,375	2.2%
Indigenous	4,205	4.68%	3,815	4.71%	2,695	3.59%	1,870	2.74%	1,555	2.49%
Southeast Asian (Note: Statistic includes total responses of "Filipino" and "Southeast Asian" under visible minority section on census.)	3,870	4.31%	2,515	3.11%	1,960	2.61%	1,365	2%	550	0.88%
Middle Eastern (Note: Statistic includes total responses of "West Asian" and "Arab" under visible minority section on census.)	2,265	2.52%	900	1.11%	465	0.62%	360	0.53%	250	0.4%
African	1,440	1.6%	945	1.17%	940	1.25%	695	1.02%	635	1.02%
Latin American	1,310	1.46%	875	1.08%	480	0.64%	385	0.56%	200	0.32%
Other/multiracial (Note: Statistic includes total responses of "Visible minority, n.i.e." and "Multiple visible minorities" under visible minority section on census.)	1,075	1.2%	660	0.82%	470	0.63%	290	0.43%	255	0.41%
Total responses	89,860	98.76%	80,970	98.44%	75,140	98.8%	68,160	98.86%	62,380	98.75%
Total population	90,990	100%	82,256	100%	76,052	100%	68,949	100%	63,169	100%
Note: Totals greater than 100% due to multiple origin responses

=== Religion ===
According to the 2021 census, religious groups in Maple Ridge included:

- Irreligion (50,135 persons or 55.8%)
- Christianity (33,120 persons or 36.9%)
- Islam (2,105 persons or 2.3%)
- Sikhism (1,925 persons or 2.1%)
- Hinduism (890 persons or 1.0%)
- Buddhism (520 persons or 0.6%)
- Judaism (145 persons or 0.2%)
- Indigenous Spirituality (80 persons or 0.1%)

=== Language ===
78.5% of residents spoke English as their mother tongue in 2021. The next most common first languages were Chinese languages (2.5%), Punjabi (1.5%), Tagalog (1.5%), Persian (1.5%), Spanish (1.2%), Korean (1.1%), French (1.0%). 2.2% of residents listed both English and a non-official language as mother tongues.

== Economy ==
Early settlers in Maple Ridge engaged in forestry and agriculture. Forestry companies continue to be the largest private-sector employers in the district. They include Interfor and companies that manufacture building materials, yachts and poles.

Maple Ridge hosted the only North American high-volume manufacturer of lithium-ion batteries, E-One Moli Energy. However, the factory suffered major layoffs due to the 2008 recession and now only hosts a small product testing team.

The city of Maple Ridge has become a popular location for feature films and television series. The Ridge Film Studios is located downtown, in an old retail space, and serves as a set location for episodic television programs. Maple Ridge's film roots go back to the 1970s, when scenes for the feature film Rambo were shot here. Over time the city has been a background for a number of films and television series, including The X-Files, Bordertown, Smallville, Bird on a Wire, We're No Angels, Percy Jackson & the Olympians: The Lightning Thief, and Stargate SG-1. The old Bordertown set was featured in an episode of the WB series Legends of Tomorrow.

The city is currently working to zone new commercial and industrial lands in order to expand local employment opportunities.

== Arts and culture ==
Venues for performing arts in Maple Ridge include the Arts Centre and Theatre (ACT), the bandstand in Memorial Peace Park, and various theatres in local secondary schools.

The ACT contains a main stage theatre capable of seating 486 for musical and dramatic performances as well as a studio theatre used for other performances, classes and special events. The ACT is also home to a conference room and smaller classrooms for activities such as pottery and painting. The ACT is a non-profit public resource. The Maple Ridge Art Gallery is also located in the ACT, focusing on local artists and art students.

Maple Ridge also has several festivals and annual parades, including the Santa Claus Parade & Christmas in the Park, Earth Day celebrations in Memorial Peace Park, Canada Day in Memorial Peace Park, GETI Fest in Memorial Peace Park, AdStock Music Festival in Memorial Peace Park, Aboriginal Day celebrations in Memorial Peace Park, The Celebrate the Night Halloween & Fireworks event at Memorial Peace Park, the Caribbean Festival at the Albion Fairgrounds and one of the longest running agricultural fairs in BC, Country Fest at the fairgrounds.

Maple Ridge offers one of the largest Remembrance Day celebrations in the Lower Mainland each November 11 at Memorial Peace Park. The event is hosted by the Royal Canadian legion Branch No. 88 and boasts annual attendance of over 2,000 local residents for the parade of veterans and first responders and moving Cenotaph ceremony.

The Haney Farmers market runs every Saturday from 9:00 am until 2:00 pm starting in May through to October at Memorial Peace Park.

Maple Ridge is the home of the Maple Ridge Concert Band, a community concert band that has been in existence for over 50 years.

== Sports ==
Maple Ridge is the hometown of several well known athletes such as baseball players Larry Walker and an inductee of the Baseball Hall of Fame and Tyler O’Neill, deceased race-car driver Greg Moore, and hockey players Cam Neely, Brendan Morrison, Brad Hunt and Andrew Ladd.

== Government ==
Maple Ridge is governed at the municipal level by a seven-member council made up of six councillors and a mayor. Five of the seven school trustees elected to the School District 42 Maple Ridge-Pitt Meadows Board of Education are chosen by Maple Ridge voters. School trustees, councillors and the mayor are elected on the same ballot for four-year terms. In addition, residents of Maple Ridge vote for representatives to the Legislative Assembly of British Columbia and the House of Commons of Canada.

Jerry Kok is the current mayor of Maple Ridge. He was first elected mayor on October 17, 2026. Previous mayors include Dan Ruimy, Gordon Robson, Kathy Morse, Al Hogarth, Bill Hartley, Belle Morse, Carl Durksen, Ernie Daykin, Nicole Read, and Mike Morden. The next Municipal Election will be held in the fall of 2026.

Maple Ridge federal election results
Year	Liberal		Conservative		New Democratic		Green	
2021	24%	10,346	37%	15,947	31%	13,408	0%	0
2019	29%	12,911	37%	16,395	24%	10,555	8%	3,459

Maple Ridge provincial election results
Year	New Democratic		Liberal		Green	
2020	58%	20,821	36%	12,945	5%	1,921
2017	43%	15,960	40%	14,703	13%	4,638

Maple Ridge has two constituencies in the Legislative Assembly of British Columbia. As of the 2024 provincial election, the city has been represented by Conservative Party MLA Lawrence Mok in Maple Ridge East and BC NDP MLA Lisa Beare in Maple Ridge-Pitt Meadows.

Maple Ridge has one constituency in the House of Commons of Canada. In the 2019 federal election and 2021 federal election, the Conservative Party won the seat. The MP is Marc Dalton.

== Transportation ==
Translink provides public transit services to Maple Ridge, via buses and the West Coast Express. Haney Place Exchange is the main bus exchange, with every bus line in Maple Ridge stopping here at some point along its route.

Maple Ridge is connected via Highway 7 to Pitt Meadows in the west and Mission in the east, and also by the Dewdney Trunk Road, a more northerly route which crosses into Mission via the community of Stave Falls.

The Golden Ears Bridge connects Maple Ridge and Pitt Meadows to Langley.

The Pitt Meadows Regional Airport is the only Fraser Valley airport (other than water airports) located on the Fraser River's north side. It is located 2.5 km (1.6 mi) east of the confluence of the Pitt and Fraser rivers, and serves the area north of the Fraser River from Mission up to and including Vancouver.

== Education ==
Public schools are administered by School District 42 Maple Ridge-Pitt Meadows. The school district serves residents of Maple Ridge and neighbouring Pitt Meadows, along with students transferred in from other British Columbia school districts. The district also accepts international students.

The school district operates eighteen elementary schools, five secondary schools, an adult learning centre, a community college, and several other educational facilities in Maple Ridge.

Several of the five public secondary schools have specialized in certain areas and/or started academy programs to attract more students.

Thomas Haney Secondary School operates on a self-directed learning system that is designed to allow students to plot their own paths toward fulfilling ministry learning outcomes. The school also operates an equestrian academy for all abilities as well as music, theatre and athletic programs.

Samuel Robertson Technical Secondary School, opened in 2005, was designed to allow students to experience various technologies as well as their traditional education. The school offers various trades programs in partnership with local trade schools and colleges.

Garibaldi Secondary School offers the International Baccalaureate program and DigiPen Technology Academy.

Westview Secondary School and Maple Ridge Secondary School are the other two public high schools in Maple Ridge.

Several of the elementary schools also offer non-traditional systems. These include Kanaka Creek Elementary, which operates a year-round schooling system, exchanging a long summer break for shorter breaks throughout the year; and Alouette Elementary School, which operates a cyberschool program, enabling some students to work from home on a computer on certain days.

Several private schools are located in Maple Ridge. These include: Meadowridge School, a JK-12 independent non-denominational school; James Cameron School, a school for children in Grades 2–7 with learning disabilities; St. Patrick's, a Catholic school, and Maple Ridge Christian School which is K-12. These are not operated by the school district, but must still meet the British Columbia Ministry of Education standards.

Post-secondary education in Maple Ridge is available through:

- British Columbia Institute of Technology, which offers courses as part of the BCIT School of Business Entrepreneurship Associate Certificate Program;
- Douglas College, which has a campus in Thomas Haney Secondary School and also offers courses at the Ridge Meadows Maternity Clinic; and
- Sprott Shaw College, which is a private post-secondary institution.

== Notable people ==
- Jonathan Scott and Drew Scott, TV personalities - The Property Brothers
- Snak the Ripper, rapper
- Elizabeth Bachinsky, poet
- Linda Chung, Hong Kong actress and singer, was born in Maple Ridge.
- Matthew Good, rock musician
- Stirling Hart, World Champion Lumberjack, was born and raised in Maple Ridge.
- Brad Hunt, NHL player for the Washington Capitals
- Susan Jacks, singer/songwriter
- Alexz Johnson, Music Artist/Vocalist, Actress in Instant Star, So Weird, Final Destination, Stranger with My Face
- Kyle Labine, actor
- Tyler Labine, actor
- Andrew Ladd, former professional hockey player
- Karina LeBlanc, professional soccer player for Team Canada
- Madeline Merlo, country music singer/songwriter
- Greg Moore, Champ Car driver
- Michael Moriarty, U.S.-Canadian stage and screen actor and jazz musician
- George Mussallem, former Member of the Legislative Assembly (MLA) of British Columbia
- Helen Mussallem, Companion of the Order of Canada recipient
- Cam Neely, Hall of Fame National Hockey League (NHL) player
- Tyler O'Neill, Major League Baseball (MLB) player
- Molly Parker, actress
- El Phantasmo, professional wrestler
- Gregory Scofield, poet
- Jaswinder Kaur Sidhu, domestic murder victim, subject of documentaries and a made-for-television movie
- Scott Smith, bassist for Loverboy
- Rick Tippe, country music artist
- Larry Walker, Hall of Fame Major League Baseball (MLB) player
- Giuseppe du Toit, professional rugby player
- Linus Sebastian, media personality
