= Haney, British Columbia =

Human settlement in British Columbia, Canada

Coordinates: 49°13′N 122°36′W

Haney
- Neighborhood / Downtown core
- Haney, British Columbia
- Location within British Columbia
- Country: Canada
- Province: British Columbia
- Regional district: Metro Vancouver
- City: Maple Ridge
- Founded: 1876
- Named for: Thomas Haney

Population
  - City (Maple Ridge): 90,990 (2,021)
- Time zone: UTC−08:00 (PST (UTC−8))
  - Summer (DST): PDT (UTC−7)
- Postal code: V2W–V2X
- Area code: 604 / 778 / 236 / 672

Haney, British Columbia is the name of the downtown core of the city of Maple Ridge, British Columbia. The name derived originally from Thomas Haney, the namesake of Port Haney, the neighbourhood adjoining today's downtown along the Fraser River immediately south, which is today includes a station on the West Coast Express and was formerly a steamboat port. Port Haney is a designated heritage district in Maple Ridge and includes buildings moved to the neighbourhood from other parts of the municipality that otherwise might have been demolished.

== Features ==
Haney is the location of the Maple Ridge Municipal Hall and the Maple Ridge/Pitt Meadows school board office. It also houses part of Maple Ridge public library, leisure centre, RCMP headquarters and other public facilities within a mall complex known as Haney Place. Another mall lies within the town, just east of Haney Place, called Valleyfair.

Location of Haney in British Columbia

== Schools ==
Haney is served by School District 42 Maple Ridge-Pitt Meadows.

== Climate ==
Climate data for Haney
| Month | Jan | Feb | Mar | Apr | May | Jun | Jul | Aug | Sep | Oct | Nov | Dec | Year |
|---|---|---|---|---|---|---|---|---|---|---|---|---|---|
| Record high °C (°F) | 16.0 (60.8) | 19.4 (66.9) | 24.5 (76.1) | 29.0 (84.2) | 36.5 (97.7) | 34.5 (94.1) | 36.7 (98.1) | 36.7 (98.1) | 35.5 (95.9) | 28.5 (83.3) | 19.0 (66.2) | 17.0 (62.6) | 36.7 (98.1) |
| Mean daily maximum °C (°F) | 5.4 (41.7) | 8.2 (46.8) | 11.1 (52.0) | 14.5 (58.1) | 17.8 (64.0) | 20.4 (68.7) | 23.6 (74.5) | 23.9 (75.0) | 20.9 (69.6) | 14.6 (58.3) | 8.6 (47.5) | 5.3 (41.5) | 14.5 (58.1) |
| Daily mean °C (°F) | 2.4 (36.3) | 4.4 (39.9) | 6.6 (43.9) | 9.3 (48.7) | 12.4 (54.3) | 15.1 (59.2) | 17.5 (63.5) | 17.7 (63.9) | 14.8 (58.6) | 10.1 (50.2) | 5.4 (41.7) | 2.6 (36.7) | 9.9 (49.8) |
| Mean daily minimum °C (°F) | −0.6 (30.9) | 0.6 (33.1) | 2.0 (35.6) | 4.0 (39.2) | 7.0 (44.6) | 9.8 (49.6) | 11.4 (52.5) | 11.5 (52.7) | 8.7 (47.7) | 5.5 (41.9) | 2.3 (36.1) | −0.3 (31.5) | 5.2 (41.4) |
| Record low °C (°F) | −20.0 (−4.0) | −15.0 (5.0) | −9.0 (15.8) | −3.3 (26.1) | −1.1 (30.0) | 1.1 (34.0) | 4.4 (39.9) | 3.3 (37.9) | −1.7 (28.9) | −7.0 (19.4) | −18.0 (−0.4) | −19.4 (−2.9) | −20.0 (−4.0) |
| Average precipitation mm (inches) | 227.1 (8.94) | 178.8 (7.04) | 158.8 (6.25) | 133.0 (5.24) | 111.4 (4.39) | 91.3 (3.59) | 66.2 (2.61) | 60.6 (2.39) | 86.1 (3.39) | 161.9 (6.37) | 266.5 (10.49) | 249.9 (9.84) | 1,788.5 (70.41) |
Source: Environment Canada
