= School District 42 Maple Ridge-Pitt Meadows =

School district in British Columbia, Canada

Maple Ridge-Pitt Meadows School District No.42

Location
- Maple Ridge Maple Ridge, Pitt Meadows in Fraser Valley Canada

District information
- Superintendent: Teresa Downs
- Schools: 28
- Budget: CA$123.8 million

Students and staff
- Students: Approximately 16,000

Other information
- Website: www.sd42.ca

School District 42 Maple Ridge-Pitt Meadows is a school district in British Columbia east of Vancouver. This includes Maple Ridge and Pitt Meadows.

== Data breach ==
In January 2023, Maple Ridge-Pitt Meadows School District suffered a data breach resulting in 19,126 records being leaked of students and staff: first name, last name; school/department; district email address; grade level (K-12). The district notified families about the breach on January 17, 2023. The data was distributed on a hacking forum.

== Board of education ==
- Board of Education (2022–2026): The trustees for School District No. 42 are Elaine Yamamoto (chair), Kim Dumore (Vice-chair), Hudson Campbell, Gabriel Liosis, Mike Murray, Pascale Shaw, and Kathleen Sullivan. They were all elected in November 2022 for a four-year term. The Chief Executive Officer for the district: Teresa Downs (Feb 2024–present), Harry Dhillon (2021 - 2024). Richard Rennie serves as the Secretary Treasurer.
- Board of Education (2018–2022): The trustees for School District No. 42 were Korleen Carreras (chair), Elaine Yamamoto (Vice-chair), Kim Dumore, Mike Murray, Pascale Shaw, Katie Sullivan, and Colette Trudeau. They were all elected in November 2014 for a four-year term. The Chief Executive Officer for the district: Harry Dhillon (2021 - 2024), Sylvia Russell (2014 - 2021). Flavia Coughlan served as the Secretary Treasurer.
- Board of Education (2014–2018): The trustees for School District No. 42 were Mike Murray (chair), Susan Carr (Vice-chair), Lisa Beare, Korleen Carreras, Ken Clarkson, Eleanor Palis and Dr. Dave Rempel. They were all elected in November 2014 for a four-year term. The Chief Executive Officer for the district was Sylvia Russell. Flavia Coughlan served as the Secretary Treasurer.
- Board of Education (2011–2014): The trustees for School District No. 42 were Mike Murray (chair), Eleanor Palis (Vice-chair), Susan Carr, Ken Clarkson, Kathy Marshall, Sarah Nelson, and Dave Rempel. They were all elected in November 2011 for a three-year term. The Chief Executive Officer for the district was Jan Unwin. Flavia Coughlan served as the Secretary Treasurer.

== Issues and research ==
Former Maple Ridge trustee Katherine Wagner (elected: 1996–2005 before retiring from political office) wrote a School Watch column, printed bi-weekly in The Maple Ridge and Pitt Meadows Times.

== Schools ==
School	Location	Grades	Features
Albion Elementary School	Maple Ridge	K-7	
Environmental School	Maple Ridge	K-9	Majority of education done outside at various locations throughout the school district
Alexander Robinson Elementary School	Maple Ridge	K-7	
Alouette Elementary School	Maple Ridge	K-7	
Arthur Peake Centre	Maple Ridge	11-12	
Blue Mountain Elementary School	Maple Ridge	K-7	
Continuing Ed SD 42	Maple Ridge	11-12	
c̓əsqənelə Elementary School	Maple Ridge	k-7	
Davie Jones Elementary School	Pitt Meadows	K-7	
District 42 Alternative Secondary School	Maple Ridge	7-11	
Edith McDermott Elementary School	Pitt Meadows	K-7	
Eric Langton Elementary School	Maple Ridge	K-7	French Immersion school
Fairview Elementary School	Maple Ridge	K-7	
Garibaldi Secondary School	Maple Ridge	8-12	offers International Baccalaureate
Glenwood Elementary School	Maple Ridge	K-7	
Golden Ears Elementary School	Maple Ridge	K-7	Late entry French Immersion (gr 6–7)
Hammond Elementary School	Maple Ridge	K-7	Montessori
Harry Hooge Elementary School	Maple Ridge	K-7	
Highland Park Elementary School	Pitt Meadows	K-7	
Kanaka Creek Elementary School	Maple Ridge	K-7	Balanced Calendar - months of December, May and August are holidays instead of traditional breaks
Laity View Elementary School	Maple Ridge	K-7	French Immersion
Maple Ridge Elementary School	Maple Ridge	K-7	French Immersion
Maple Ridge Secondary School	Maple Ridge	8-12	French Immersion
CLOSED - Mount Crescent Elementary School	Maple Ridge	K-7	
Pitt Meadows Elementary School	Pitt Meadows	K-7	French Immersion
Pitt Meadows Secondary School	Pitt Meadows	8-12	Hockey Academy, football, French Immersion
Riverside Centre (Maple Ridge)	Maple Ridge	International Education, Continuing Education, Ridge Meadows College	
Samuel Robertson Technical Secondary School	Maple Ridge	8-12	Post secondary partnership programs
Thomas Haney Centre	Maple Ridge	8-12	Self directed learning.
Webster's Corners Elementary School	Maple Ridge	K-7	
Westview Secondary School	Maple Ridge	8-12	Soccer Academy
Whonnock Elementary School	Maple Ridge	K-7	
Yennadon Elementary School	Maple Ridge	K-7	Cyberschool

== See also ==
- List of school districts in British Columbia
