= 1976 in the United States =

- Decades: 1950s; 1960s; 1970s; 1980s; 1990s
- See also: History of the United States (1964–1980); Timeline of United States history (1970–1989); List of years in the United States

Events from the year 1976 in the United States. Major events include Jimmy Carter defeating incumbent president Gerald Ford in the presidential election of that year, the incorporation of Apple Computer Company and Microsoft, and the New Jersey Supreme Court ruling that Karen Ann Quinlan could be disconnected from her ventilator.

== Incumbents ==
=== Federal government ===
- President: Gerald Ford (R-Michigan)
- Vice President: Nelson Rockefeller (R-New York)
- Chief Justice: Warren E. Burger (Virginia)
- Speaker of the House of Representatives: Carl Albert (D-Oklahoma)
- Senate Majority Leader: Mike Mansfield (D-Montana)
- Congress: 94th

==== State governments ====
Governors and lieutenant governors

=== Governors ===
- Governor of Alabama: George Wallace (Democratic)
- Governor of Alaska: Jay Hammond (Republican)
- Governor of Arizona: Raul Hector Castro (Democratic)
- Governor of Arkansas: David Pryor (Democratic)
- Governor of California: Jerry Brown (Democratic)
- Governor of Colorado: Richard Lamm (Democratic)
- Governor of Connecticut: Ella T. Grasso (Democratic)
- Governor of Delaware: Sherman W. Tribbitt (Democratic)
- Governor of Florida: Reubin Askew (Democratic)
- Governor of Georgia: George Busbee (Democratic)
- Governor of Hawaii: George Ariyoshi (Democratic)
- Governor of Idaho: Cecil D. Andrus (Democratic)
- Governor of Illinois: Dan Walker (Democratic)
- Governor of Indiana: Otis R. Bowen (Republican)
- Governor of Iowa: Robert D. Ray (Republican)
- Governor of Kansas: Robert F. Bennett (Republican)
- Governor of Kentucky: Julian M. Carroll (Democratic)
- Governor of Louisiana: Edwin W. Edwards (Democratic)
- Governor of Maine: James B. Longley (Independent)
- Governor of Maryland: Marvin Mandel (Democratic)
- Governor of Massachusetts: Michael Dukakis (Democratic)
- Governor of Michigan: William Milliken (Republican)
- Governor of Minnesota: Wendell R. Anderson (Democratic) (until December 29), Rudy Perpich (Democratic) (starting December 29)
- Governor of Mississippi: Bill Waller (Democratic) (until January 20), Cliff Finch (Democratic) (starting January 20)
- Governor of Missouri: Kit Bond (Republican)
- Governor of Montana: Thomas Lee Judge (Democratic)
- Governor of Nebraska: J. James Exon (Democratic)
- Governor of Nevada: Mike O'Callaghan (Democratic)
- Governor of New Hampshire: Meldrim Thomson, Jr. (Republican)
- Governor of New Jersey: Brendan Byrne (Democratic)
- Governor of New Mexico: Jerry Apodaca (Democratic)
- Governor of New York: Hugh Carey (Democratic)
- Governor of North Carolina: James E. Holshouser, Jr. (Republican)
- Governor of North Dakota: Arthur A. Link (Democratic)
- Governor of Ohio: Jim Rhodes (Republican)
- Governor of Oklahoma: David L. Boren (Democratic)
- Governor of Oregon: Robert W. Straub (Democratic)
- Governor of Pennsylvania: Milton Shapp (Democratic)
- Governor of Rhode Island: Philip W. Noel (Democratic)
- Governor of South Carolina: James B. Edwards (Republican)
- Governor of South Dakota: Richard F. Kneip (Democratic)
- Governor of Tennessee: Ray Blanton (Democratic)
- Governor of Texas: Dolph Briscoe (Democratic)
- Governor of Utah: Cal Rampton (Democratic)
- Governor of Vermont: Thomas P. Salmon (Democratic)
- Governor of Virginia: Mills E. Godwin, Jr. (Republican)
- Governor of Washington: Daniel J. Evans (Republican)
- Governor of West Virginia: Arch A. Moore, Jr. (Republican)
- Governor of Wisconsin: Patrick J. Lucey (Democratic)
- Governor of Wyoming: Edgar J. Herschler (Democratic)

=== Lieutenant governors ===
- Lieutenant Governor of Alabama: Jere Beasley (Democratic)
- Lieutenant Governor of Alaska: Lowell Thomas, Jr. (Republican)
- Lieutenant Governor of Arkansas: Joe Purcell (Democratic)
- Lieutenant Governor of California: Mervyn M. Dymally (Democratic)
- Lieutenant Governor of Colorado: George L. Brown (Democratic)
- Lieutenant Governor of Connecticut: Robert K. Killian (Democratic)
- Lieutenant Governor of Delaware: Eugene Bookhammer (Republican)
- Lieutenant Governor of Florida: J.H. Williams (Democratic)
- Lieutenant Governor of Georgia: Zell Miller (Democratic)
- Lieutenant Governor of Hawaii: Nelson Doi (Democratic)
- Lieutenant Governor of Idaho: John V. Evans (Democratic)
- Lieutenant Governor of Illinois: Neil Hartigan (Democratic)
- Lieutenant Governor of Indiana: Robert D. Orr (Republican)
- Lieutenant Governor of Iowa: Arthur A. Neu (Republican)
- Lieutenant Governor of Kansas: Shelby Smith (Republican)
- Lieutenant Governor of Kentucky: Thelma Stovall (Republican)
- Lieutenant Governor of Louisiana: Jimmy Fitzmorris (Democratic)
- Lieutenant Governor of Maryland: Blair Lee III (political party unknown)
- Lieutenant Governor of Massachusetts: Thomas P. O'Neill III (Democratic)
- Lieutenant Governor of Michigan: James Damman (Republican)
- Lieutenant Governor of Minnesota: Rudy Perpich (Democratic) (until December 29), Alec G. Olson (Democratic) (starting December 29)
- Lieutenant Governor of Mississippi: William F. Winter (Democratic) (until January 20), Evelyn Gandy (Democratic) (starting January 20)
- Lieutenant Governor of Missouri: William C. Phelps (Republican)
- Lieutenant Governor of Montana: Bill Christiansen (Democratic)
- Lieutenant Governor of Nebraska: Gerald Whelan (Democratic)
- Lieutenant Governor of Nevada: Robert E. Rose (Democratic)
- Lieutenant Governor of New Mexico: Robert E. Ferguson (Democratic)
- Lieutenant Governor of New York: Mary Anne Krupsak (Democratic)
- Lieutenant Governor of North Carolina: Jim Hunt (Democratic)
- Lieutenant Governor of North Dakota: Wayne G. Sanstead (Democratic)
- Lieutenant Governor of Ohio: Dick Celeste (Democratic)
- Lieutenant Governor of Oklahoma: George Nigh (Democratic)
- Lieutenant Governor of Pennsylvania: Ernest P. Kline (Democratic)
- Lieutenant Governor of Rhode Island: J. Joseph Garrahy (Democratic)
- Lieutenant Governor of South Carolina: W. Brantley Harvey, Jr. (Democratic)
- Lieutenant Governor of South Dakota: Harvey L. Wollman (Democratic)
- Lieutenant Governor of Tennessee: John S. Wilder (Democratic)
- Lieutenant Governor of Texas: William P. Hobby, Jr. (Democratic)
- Lieutenant Governor of Utah: Clyde L. Miller (Democratic)
- Lieutenant Governor of Vermont: Brian D. Burns (Democratic)
- Lieutenant Governor of Virginia: John N. Dalton (Republican)
- Lieutenant Governor of Washington: John Cherberg (Democratic)
- Lieutenant Governor of Wisconsin: Martin J. Schreiber (Democratic)

== Events ==
=== January ===
- January 5 – The Beatles associate Mal Evans is fatally shot by police amid a disturbance at his Los Angeles home.
- January 14 – The Lutz family flees from 112 Ocean Avenue in Amityville, Long Island, New York, 28 days after having moved in on December 18, 1975, inspiring the story The Amityville Horror.
- January 15 – Would-be Gerald Ford presidential assassin Sara Jane Moore is sentenced to life in prison.
- January 18 – Super Bowl X in American football: The Pittsburgh Steelers defeat the Dallas Cowboys 21–17 at the Orange Bowl in Miami, Florida.
- January 19 – Jimmy Carter wins the Iowa Democratic Caucus.
- January 23 – Hugo the Hippo, the first animated film of 20th Century Fox is released in theaters.
- January 27 – The United States vetoes a United Nations resolution that calls for an independent Palestinian state.
- January 30 – Live from Lincoln Center debuts on PBS.

=== February ===
- February 5 – Nearly 2,000 students become involved in a racially charged riot at Escambia High School in Pensacola, Florida; 30 students are injured in the 4-hour fray.
- February 12 – Actor Sal Mineo, known for his role in the film Rebel Without a Cause, is fatally stabbed in the alley behind his apartment building in West Hollywood, California, aged 37.
- February 17 – The Eagles' Their Greatest Hits (1971–1975) compilation is released. Globally, it will become probably the second best-selling album of all time, followed by the same band's Hotel California, released on December 8.
- February 19 – Former Tower of Power vocalist Rick Stevens is arrested for murdering three men during a botched drug deal. He ultimately serves 36 years of a life sentence.

=== March ===
- March – The Cray-1, the first commercially developed supercomputer, is released by Seymour Cray's Cray Research, with the first purchaser being the Energy Research and Development Administration (ERDA) in Los Alamos, New Mexico.
- March 1 – Bradford Bishop allegedly murders five of his family members in Bethesda, Maryland. The crime goes undiscovered for 10 days and the suspect is never caught. From 2014 to 2018 he is on the FBI Ten Most Wanted Fugitives list.
- March 9–11 – Two coal mine explosions claim 26 lives at the Blue Diamond Coal Co. Scotia Mine in Letcher County, Kentucky.
- March 14 – After eight years on NBC, The Wizard of Oz returns to CBS, where it will remain until 1999, setting what is likely a record at that time for the most telecasts of a Hollywood film on a commercial television network. (That record is broken by The Ten Commandments in 1996, which began its annual network telecasts on ABC in 1973, continuing be telecast by that network as of 2020.)
- March 17 – Boxer Rubin Carter is retried in New Jersey for murder; his conviction is upheld on this occasion but will be overturned in 1985.
- March 20 – Patty Hearst is found guilty of the armed robbery of a San Francisco bank in 1974.
- March 27 – The first 4.6 miles of the Washington Metro subway system opens.
- March 29 – The 48th Academy Awards ceremony, hosted by Walter Matthau, Robert Shaw, George Segal, Goldie Hawn and Gene Kelly, is held at Dorothy Chandler Pavilion in Los Angeles, broadcast on ABC for the first time. Miloš Forman's One Flew Over the Cuckoo's Nest receives nine nominations and wins five awards, including Best Picture and Best Director for Forman. Isabelle Adjani becomes the youngest actress to be nominated for Best Actress until 2004, while George Burns becomes the oldest actor to win Best Supporting Actor until 2012, as well as the oldest awardee in general until 1989 and the final person born in the 19th century to win an acting award.
- March 31 – The New Jersey Supreme Court rules that persistent vegetative state patient Karen Ann Quinlan can be disconnected from her ventilator. She remains comatose and dies in 1985.

=== April ===
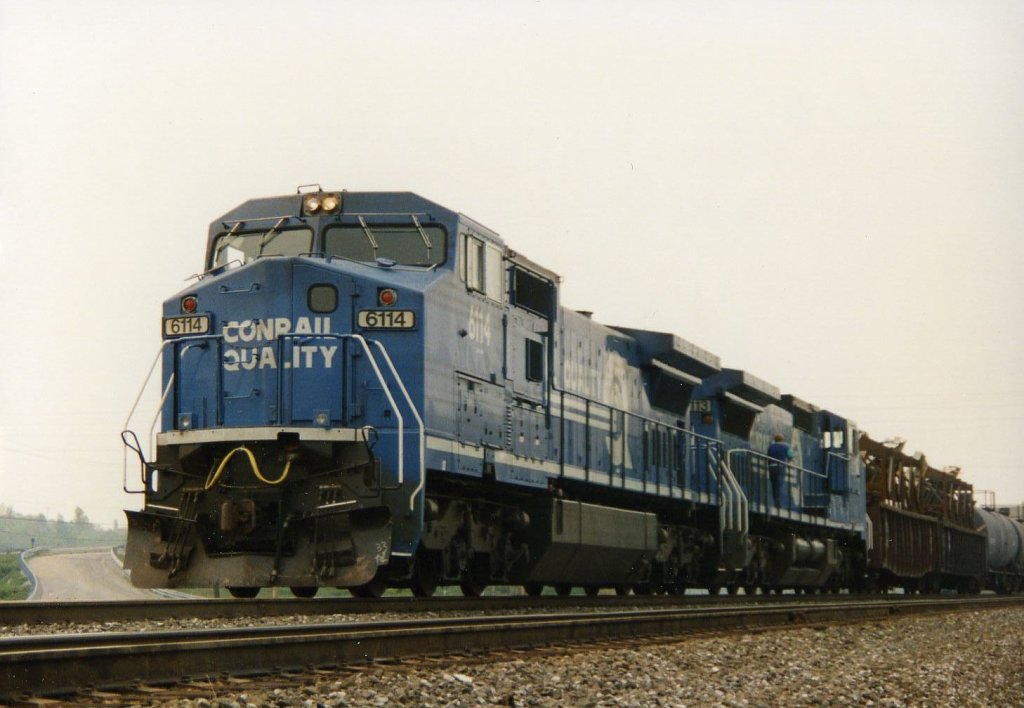
April 1: Conrail

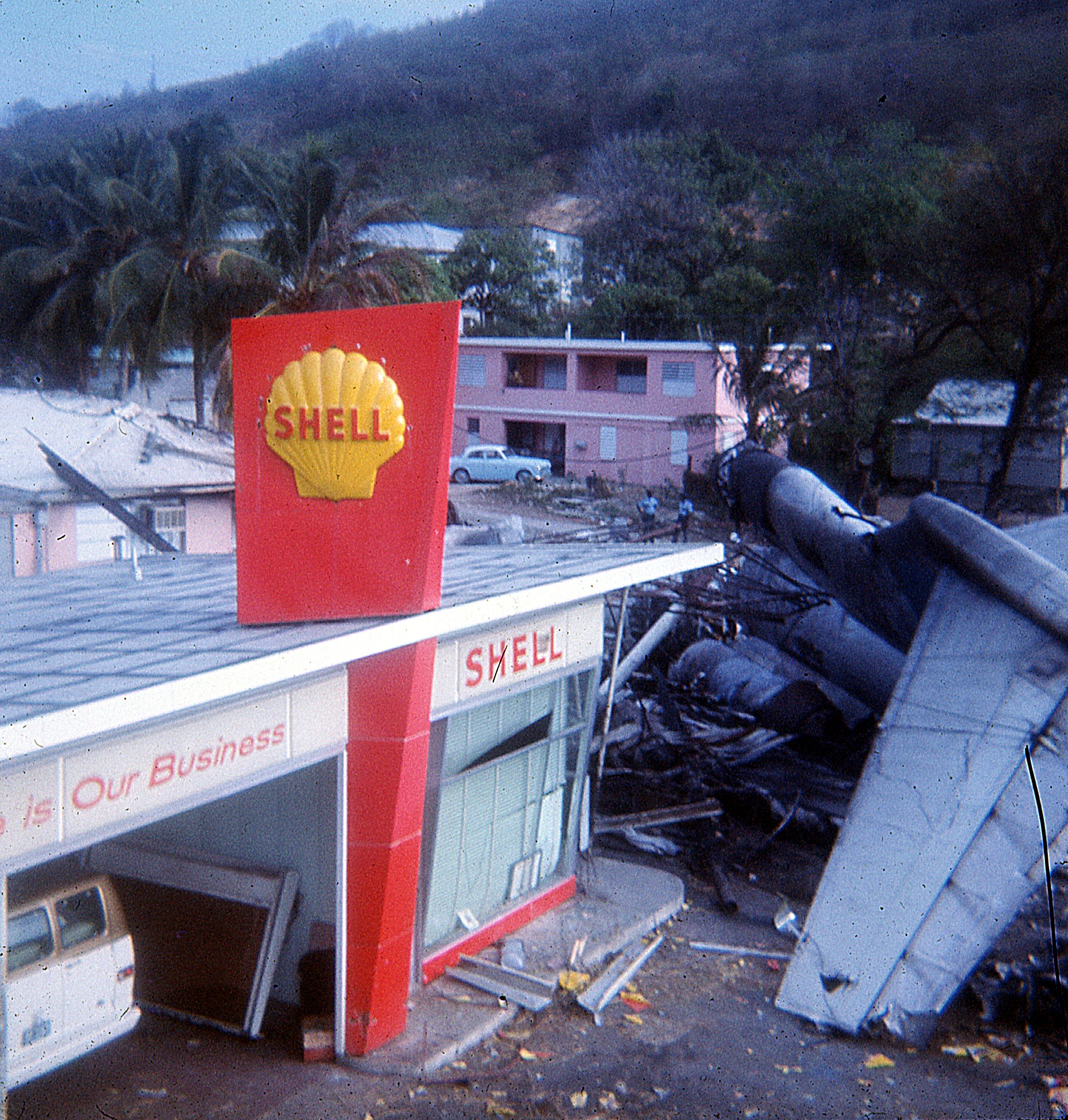
April 27, 1976: American Airlines Flight 625 overshoots runway, 37 people killed

- April 1
  - Conrail (Consolidated Rails Corporation) is formed by the U.S. government, to take control of 13 major Northeast Class-1 railroads that have filed for bankruptcy protection. Conrail takes control at midnight, as a government-owned and operated railroad until 1986, when it is sold to the public.
  - Apple Computer Company is formed by Steve Jobs and Steve Wozniak in California.
- April 13 – The United States Treasury Department reintroduces the two-dollar bill as a Federal Reserve Note on Thomas Jefferson's 233rd birthday as part of the United States Bicentennial celebration.
- April 27 – Thirty-seven of the 88 people on American Airlines Flight 625 are killed when the Boeing 727 overruns the runway crashes at St. Thomas, U.S. Virgin Islands. Flight 625 had originated in Providence, Rhode Island and then departed for Kennedy International Airport in New York at 11:45 in the morning before crashing shortly after its 4:00 p.m. landing.

=== May ===
- May 11
  - President Gerald Ford signs the Federal Election Campaign Act.
  - An accident involving a tanker truck carrying anhydrous ammonia takes place in Houston, Texas, resulting in the deaths of 7 people.
- May 21
  - The Yuba City bus disaster, the second-worst bus crash in U.S. history, leaves 28 students and one teacher dead.
  - The "Famous Fire" in McKeesport, Pennsylvania, destroys seven downtown structures, damages more than 12 others, and starts fires in at least 10 homes.
- May 24
  - Washington, D.C. Concorde service begins.
  - The Judgment of Paris pits French vs. California wines in a blind taste-test in Paris, France. California wines win the contest, surprising the wine world and opening the wine industry to newcomers in several countries.
- May 25 – President Gerald Ford defeats challenger Ronald Reagan in three Republican presidential primaries: Kentucky, Tennessee and Oregon.
- May 30 – Indianapolis 500 automobile race: Johnny Rutherford wins the (rain-shortened) shortest race in event history to date, at 102 laps or 255 miles (408 km).

=== June ===
- June 2 – A car bomb kills Arizona Republic reporter Don Bolles.
- June 5 – The Teton Dam collapses in southeast Idaho, killing 11 people.
- June 13 – Savage thunderstorms roll through the state of Iowa spawning several tornadoes, including an F-5 tornado that destroys the town of Jordan, Iowa.
- June 16 – Francis E. Meloy, Jr., the newly appointed United States Ambassador to Lebanon, is assassinated in Beirut.
- June 17 – The National Basketball Association and the American Basketball Association agree on the ABA-NBA merger.
- June 20 – Hundreds of Western tourists are moved from Beirut and taken to safety in Syria by the U.S. military, following the murder of the U.S. ambassador to Lebanon.

=== July ===
July 4: United States Bicentennial

- July 3 – Gregg v. Georgia: The Supreme Court of the United States rules that the death penalty is not inherently cruel or unusual and is a constitutionally acceptable form of punishment.
- July 4
  - United States Bicentennial: From coast to coast, the United States celebrates the 200th anniversary of the Declaration of Independence.
  - The Puerto Rican Socialist Party leads 50,000 marchers in Philadelphia to demand a "Bicentennial Without Colonies" and independence for Puerto Rico.
- July 6 – The first class of women at the United States Naval Academy is inducted in Annapolis, Maryland.
- July 12
  - California State University, Fullerton massacre: seven people are shot and killed, and two others are wounded in a mass shooting on campus at California State University, Fullerton.
  - Barbara Jordan is the first African-American to keynote a political convention.
  - Price Club, as predecessor of Costco, a worldwide membership-registration-only retailer, is founded in California.
  - Family Feud debuts on ABC-TV.
- July 15
  - Jimmy Carter is nominated for U.S. President at the Democratic National Convention in New York City.
  - Twenty-six Chowchilla schoolchildren and their bus driver are abducted and buried in a box truck within a quarry in Livermore, California. The captives dig themselves free after 16 hours. The quarry-owner's son and two accomplices are arrested for the crime.
- July 20
  - Viking program: The Viking 1 lander successfully lands on Mars, taking the first close-up color photos of the planet's surface.
  - Gary Gilmore is arrested for murdering two men in Utah.
- July 26 – In Los Angeles, Ronald Reagan announces his choice of liberal U.S. Senator Richard Schweiker as his vice presidential running mate, in an effort to woo moderate Republican delegates away from President Gerald Ford.
- July 27 – Delegates attending an American Legion convention at The Bellevue-Stratford Hotel in Philadelphia begin falling ill with a form of pneumonia: this will eventually be recognised as the first outbreak of Legionnaires' disease and will end in the deaths of 29 attendees.
- July 29 – In New York City, the "Son of Sam" pulls a gun from a paper bag, killing one and seriously wounding another, in the first of a series of attacks that terrorize the city for the next year.
- July 30 – Caitlyn Jenner (at this time, Bruce Jenner) wins the gold medal in the men's decathlon at the 1976 Summer Olympics in Montreal.
- July 31
  - NASA releases the famous Face on Mars photo, taken by Viking 1.
  - The Big Thompson River in northern Colorado floods, destroying more than 400 cars and houses.

=== August ===
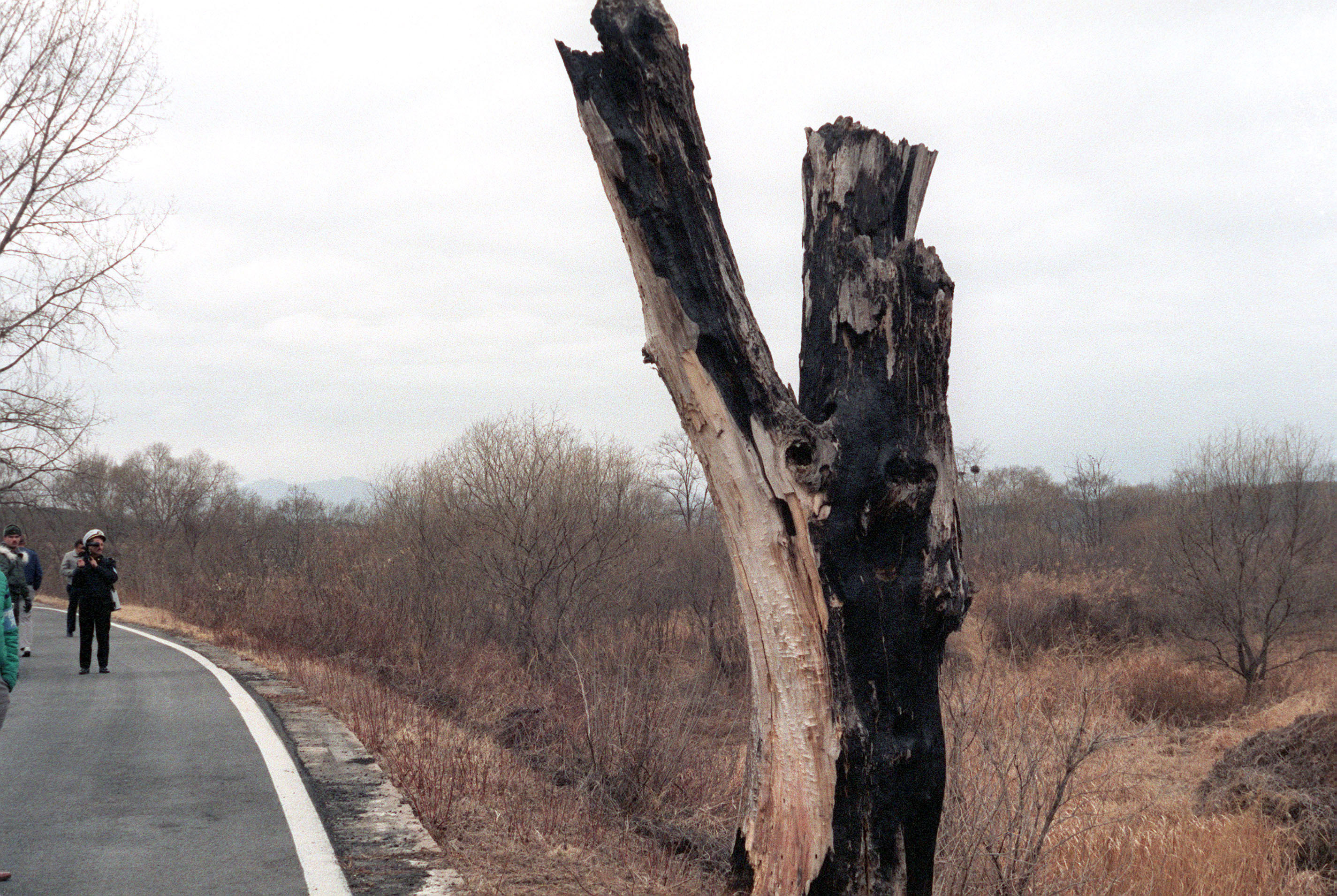
August 18: Axe murder incident

- August 1 – The Seattle Seahawks and Tampa Bay Buccaneers play their first football games.
- August 2 – A gunman murders Andrea Wilborn and Stan Farr and injures Priscilla Davis and Gus Gavrel, in an incident at Priscilla's mansion in Fort Worth, Texas. T. Cullen Davis, Priscilla's estranged husband and one of the richest men in Texas, is tried and found not guilty in 1977.
- August 4 – The first recognized outbreak of Legionnaires' disease kills 29 at the American Legion convention in Philadelphia.
- August 7 – Viking program: Viking 2 enters into orbit around Mars.
- August 8 – As part of the American Basketball Association–National Basketball Association merger, a dispersal draft is conducted to assign teams for the players on the two ABA franchises which have folded.
- August 10–13 – Hurricane Belle hits Long Island and southern New England. Twelve people are killed by the storm and damage is $100 million.
- August 11 – A sniper rampage in Wichita, Kansas on a Holiday Inn results in 3 deaths while 7 others are wounded.
- August 18 – At Panmunjom, North Korea, two United States soldiers are killed while trying to chop down part of a tree in the Korean Demilitarized Zone which has obscured their view.
- August 19 – President Gerald Ford edges out challenger Ronald Reagan to win the Republican Party presidential nomination in Kansas City.
- August 28 – Actress Anissa Jones, known for playing the child Buffy Davis in the late 60s–early 70s sitcom Family Affair, is found dead of an accidental overdose in Oceanside, California.

=== September ===
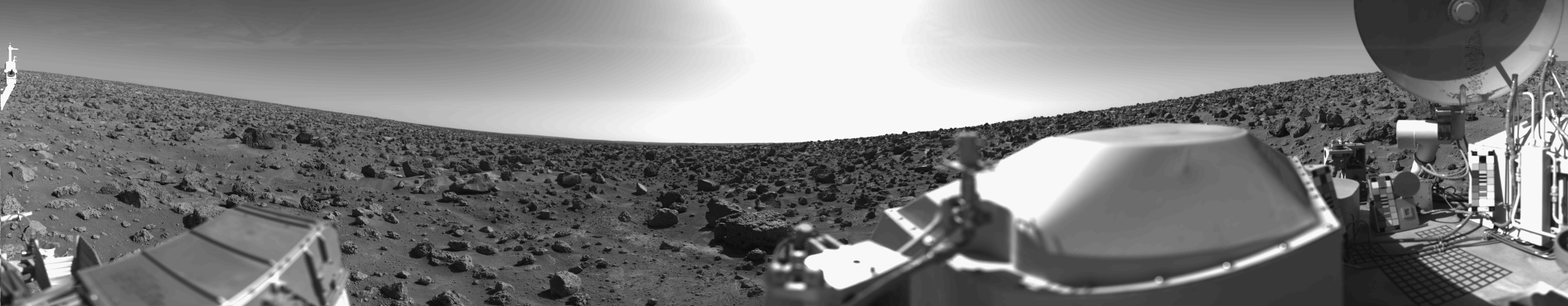
September 3: Viking 2 lands on Mars

- September 3 – Viking program: The Viking 2 spacecraft lands at Utopia Planitia on Mars.
- September 6
  - Cold War: Soviet Air Force pilot Lt. Viktor Belenko lands a MiG-25 jet fighter at Hakodate, on the island of Hokkaidō in Japan, and requests political asylum from the United States.
  - Frank Sinatra brings Jerry Lewis's former partner Dean Martin onstage, unannounced, at the 1976 Jerry Lewis MDA Telethon in Las Vegas, Nevada, reuniting the comedy team for the first (and only) time in over 20 years.
- September 17 – The space shuttle Enterprise is rolled out of a Palmdale, California hangar.
- September 21 – Orlando Letelier is assassinated in Washington, D.C. by agents of Chilean dictator Augusto Pinochet.
- September 23 – The first presidential debate of the 1976 presidential election takes place.
- September 24 – Patty Hearst is sentenced to seven years in prison for her role in the armed robbery of a San Francisco bank in 1974 (an executive clemency order from President Jimmy Carter will set her free after only 22 months).
- September 28 – American singer Stevie Wonder releases his hit album Songs in the Key of Life.

=== October ===
- October 6 – In San Francisco, during his second televised debate with Jimmy Carter, President Gerald Ford stumbles when he declares that "there is no Soviet domination of Eastern Europe" (there is at the time).
- October 9 – Pittsburgh Pirates baseball pitcher Bob Moose is killed in a car crash in Ohio on his 29th birthday.
- October 13 – The United States Commission on Civil Rights releases the report Puerto Ricans in the Continental United States: An Uncertain Future, that documents that Puerto Ricans in the United States have a poverty rate of 33 percent in 1974 (up from 29 percent in 1970), the highest of all major racial-ethnic groups in the country (not including Puerto Rico, a U.S. territory).
- October 15 – The first ever vice presidential debate in the United States takes place between Bob Dole and Walter Mondale.
- October 18 – Ford officially launches volume production of Fiesta car at its Valencia plant.
- October 19 – The Copyright Act of 1976 extends copyright duration for an additional 20 years in the United States.
- October 20 – The Mississippi River ferry MV George Prince is struck by a ship while crossing from Destrehan, Louisiana to Luling, Louisiana, killing 78 passengers and crew.
- October 21 – The Cincinnati Reds sweep the New York Yankees in four games to win the 1976 World Series.
- October 22 – Barbara Walters hosts the final presidential debate of the 1976 presidential election.
- October 25 – Clarence Norris, the last known survivor of the Scottsboro Boys, is pardoned.

=== November ===
November 2: Jimmy Carter elected President

- November 2 – 1976 United States presidential election: Jimmy Carter defeats incumbent Gerald Ford, becoming the first candidate from the Deep South to win since the Civil War.
- November 4 – Mark Fidrych, pitcher for the Detroit Tigers, wins 1976 Major League Baseball Rookie Of The Year Award.
- November 15 – The first megamouth shark is discovered off Oahu in Hawaii.
- November 25 – In San Francisco, The Band holds its farewell concert, The Last Waltz.
- November 26 – Microsoft is officially registered with the Office of the Secretary of the State of New Mexico.
- November 29 – The New York Yankees sign free agent Reggie Jackson to a five-year $3 million contract, setting the precedent for lucrative multi-year contracts for Major League Baseball players in years to come.

=== December ===
- December 8 – The Congressional Hispanic Caucus is established by the five Latinos in the United States Congress: Herman Badillo of New York, E. de la Garza and Henry B. Gonzalez of Texas, Edward R. Roybal of California, and the nonvoting Resident Commissioner of Puerto Rico, Baltasar Corrada del Rio.
- December 20 – Richard J. Daley, Mayor of Chicago since 1955, dies while in office.

=== Undated ===
- California's sodomy law repeal goes into effect (the bill was passed on May 1, 1975 in the State Senate and signed by the governor on May 12, 1975).
- The New Jersey State Legislature passes legislation legalizing casinos in the shore town of Atlantic City commencing in 1978. After signing the bill into law, Governor Brendan Byrne declares "The mob is not welcome in New Jersey!" referring to the Mafia's influence at casinos in Nevada.
- Universe, a public domain film produced by Lester Novros for NASA, is released.
- Marc Brown's children's picture book Arthur's Nose is published.

=== Ongoing ===
- Cold War (1947–1991)
- Détente (c. 1969–1979)
- Capital punishment suspended by Furman v. Georgia (1972–1976)
- 1970s energy crisis (1973–1980)

== Births ==
=== January ===
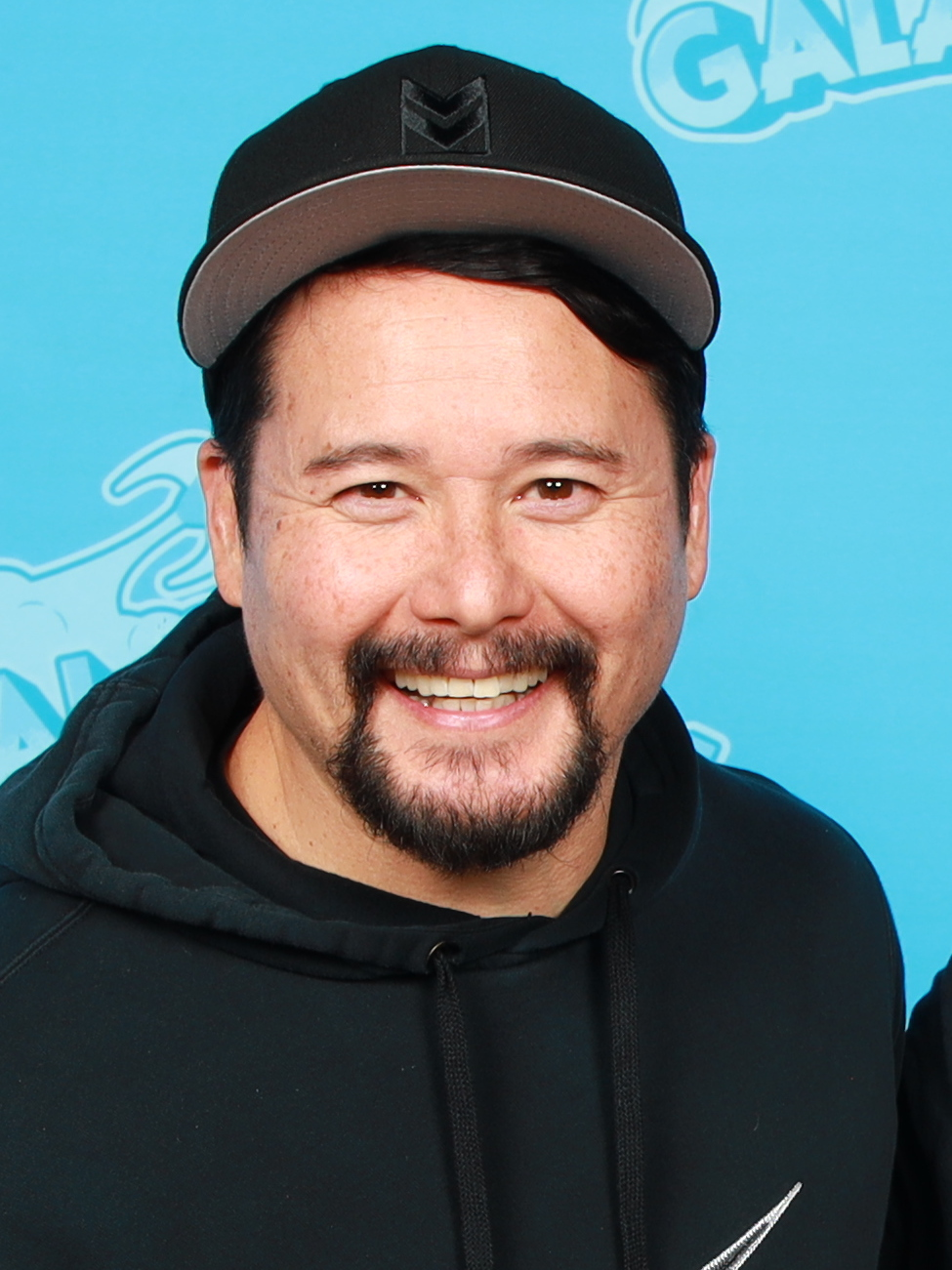
Johnny Yong Bosch

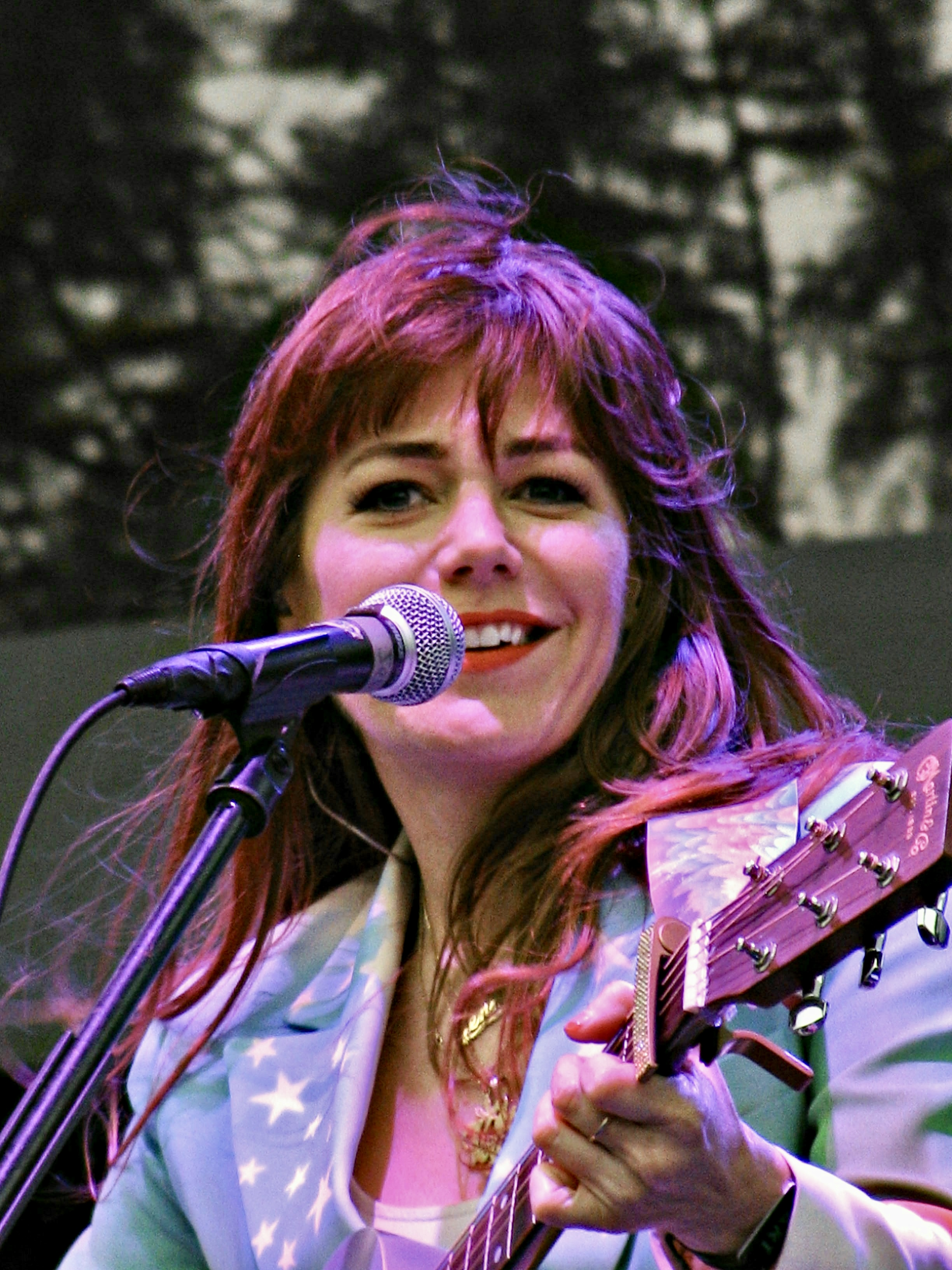
Jenny Lewis

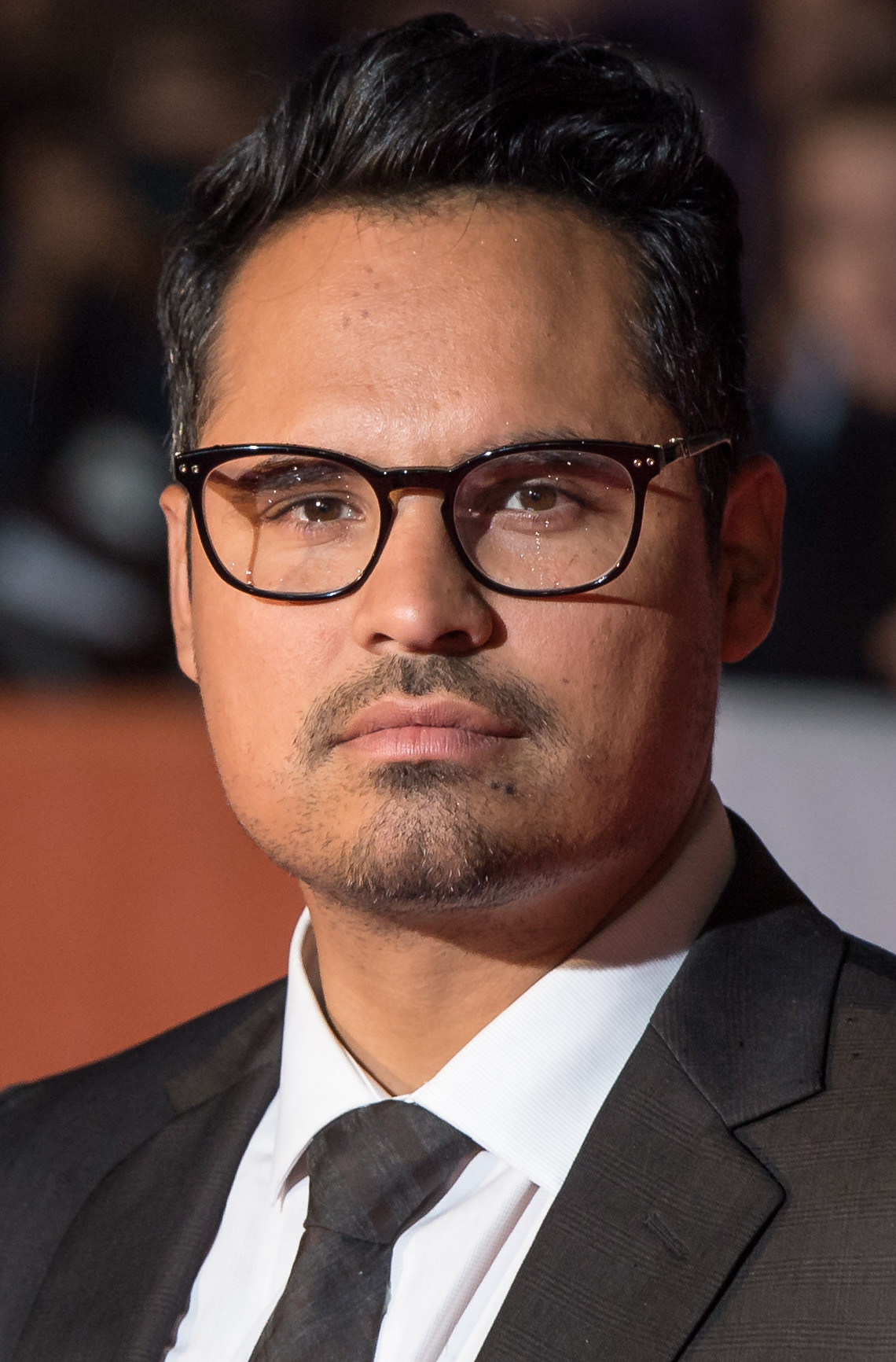
Michael Peña

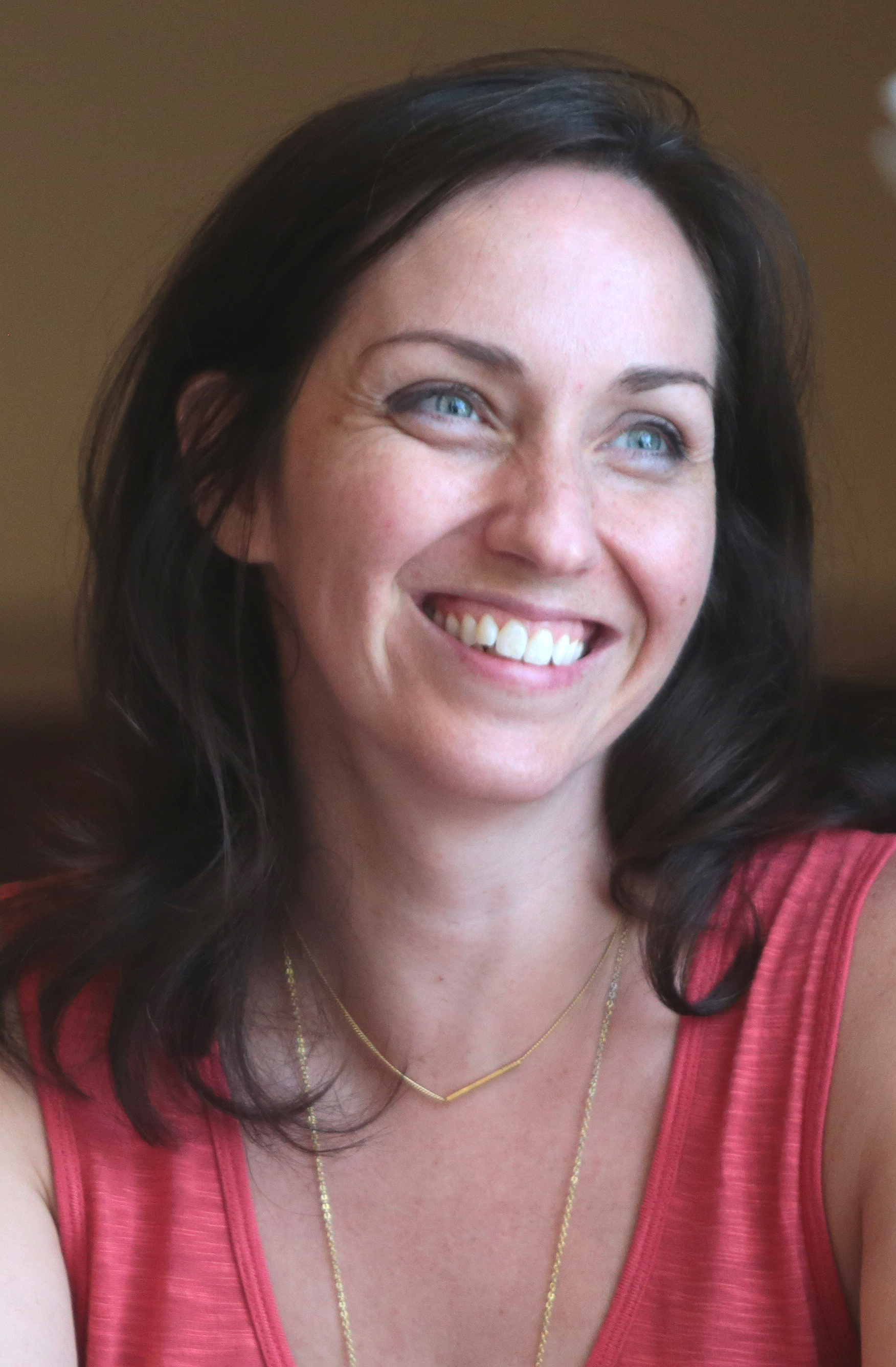
Carrie Keranen

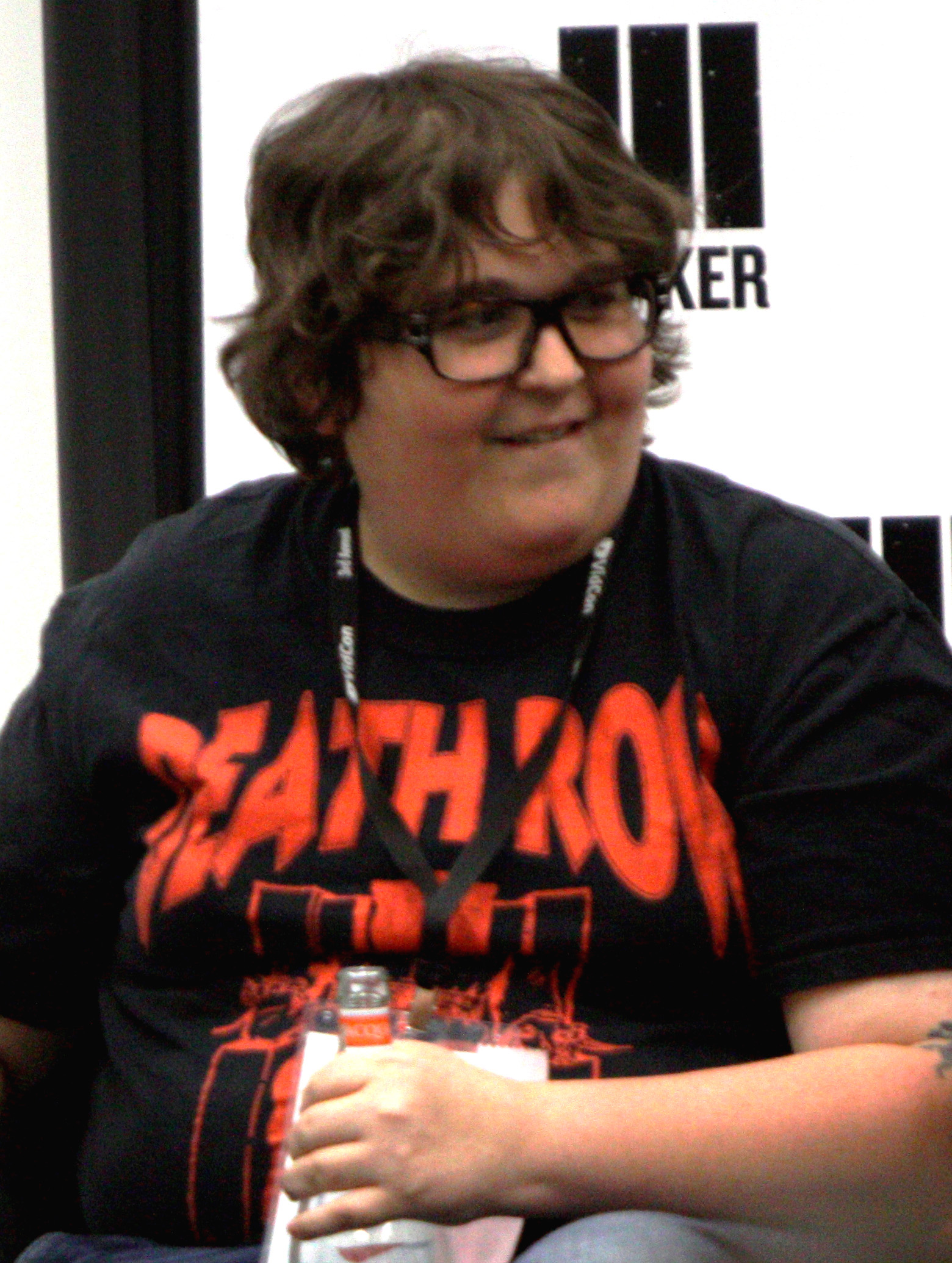
Andy Milonakis

- January 1
  - Latasha Harlins, African-American girl whose killing served as a catalyst for the 1992 Los Angeles riots (died 1991)
  - Tank, R&B musician
- January 2
  - Cletidus Hunt, football player
  - Phil Radford, environmental, clean energy and democracy leader
- January 3 – Angela Yee, radio personality
- January 4 – Ted Lilly, baseball player
- January 5
  - Alex Arcadia, artist
  - Jason Brookins, football player
  - Matt Wachter, bassist for 30 Seconds to Mars (2001-2007) and Angels & Airwaves (2007-2019)
- January 6
  - Roberto Bergersen, basketball player
  - Johnny Yong Bosch, actor, voice artist, martial artist and musician
  - Danny Pintauro, actor
- January 8
  - Jenny Lewis, actress and singer for Rilo Kiley
  - Josh Meyers, actor and comedian, brother of Seth Meyers
  - Carl Pavano, baseball player
  - Kevin Yoder, politician
- January 9 – Todd Grisham, sports broadcaster
- January 10
  - Adam Burke, comedian
  - Adam Kennedy, baseball player
- January 11
  - John Avery, football player
  - Alfonso Boone, football player
- January 13 – Michael Peña, actor and musician
- January 14 – Dan Scavino, political adviser
- January 15
  - Meredith Bishop, actress
  - Dorian Missick, actor
- January 16 – Carrie Keranen, voice actress
- January 18 – Derek Richardson, actor
- January 20
  - Wayne Bastrup, actor and musician
  - Elisabeth Bennington, politician
  - Michael Myers, football player
- January 21
  - Chad Barnhardt, football player
  - Mike Daisey, monologist, author, and actor
- January 22
  - Jimmy Anderson, baseball player
  - David Bazan, indie rock singer/songwriter and frontman for Pedro the Lion and Headphones
  - James Dearth, football player
- January 23 – Nan Whaley, politician, mayor of Dayton, Ohio (2014-2022)
- January 24 – Maria Gabriela Brito, Venezuelan-born curator, art advisor, and author
- January 25 – Stephanie Bellars, wrestling valet
- January 27
  - Clint Ford, voice actor
  - Fred Taylor, football player
- January 28 – Rick Ross, rapper
- January 29 – Chris Castle, singer/songwriter and guitarist
- January 30 – Andy Milonakis, internet and television personality
- January 31
  - Buddy Rice, race car driver
  - Paul Scheer, actor and comedian

=== February ===
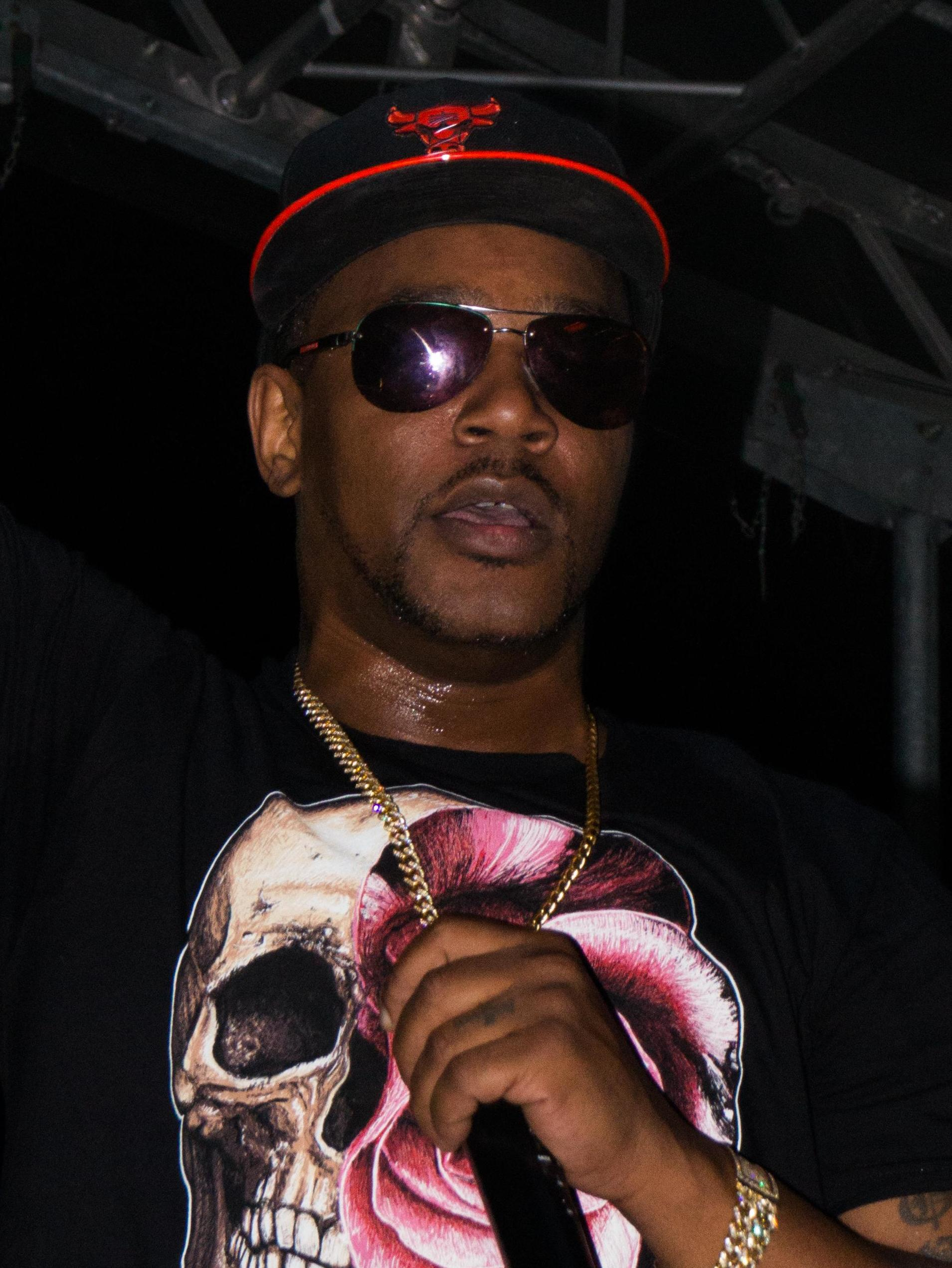
Cam'ron

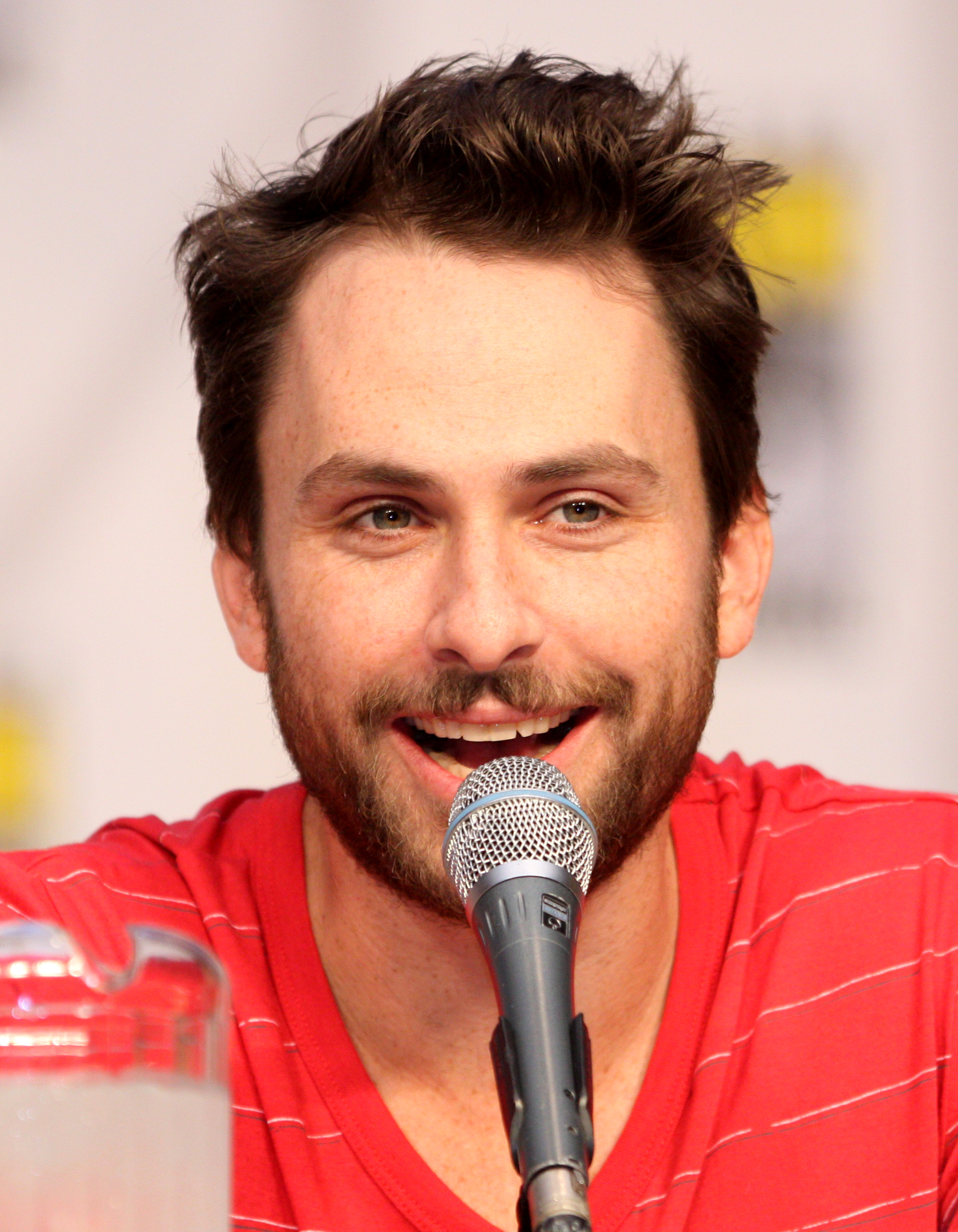
Charlie Day

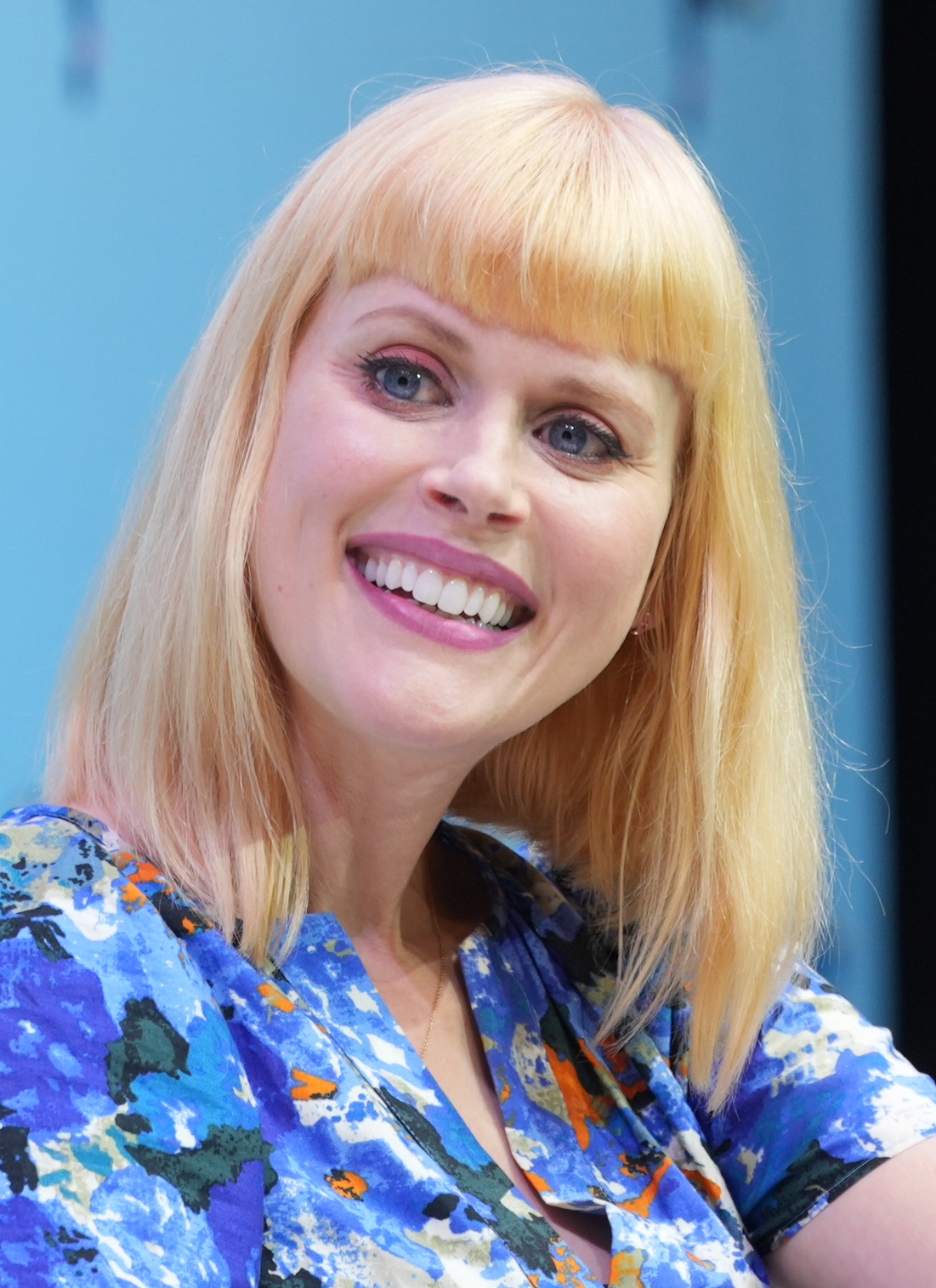
Janet Varney

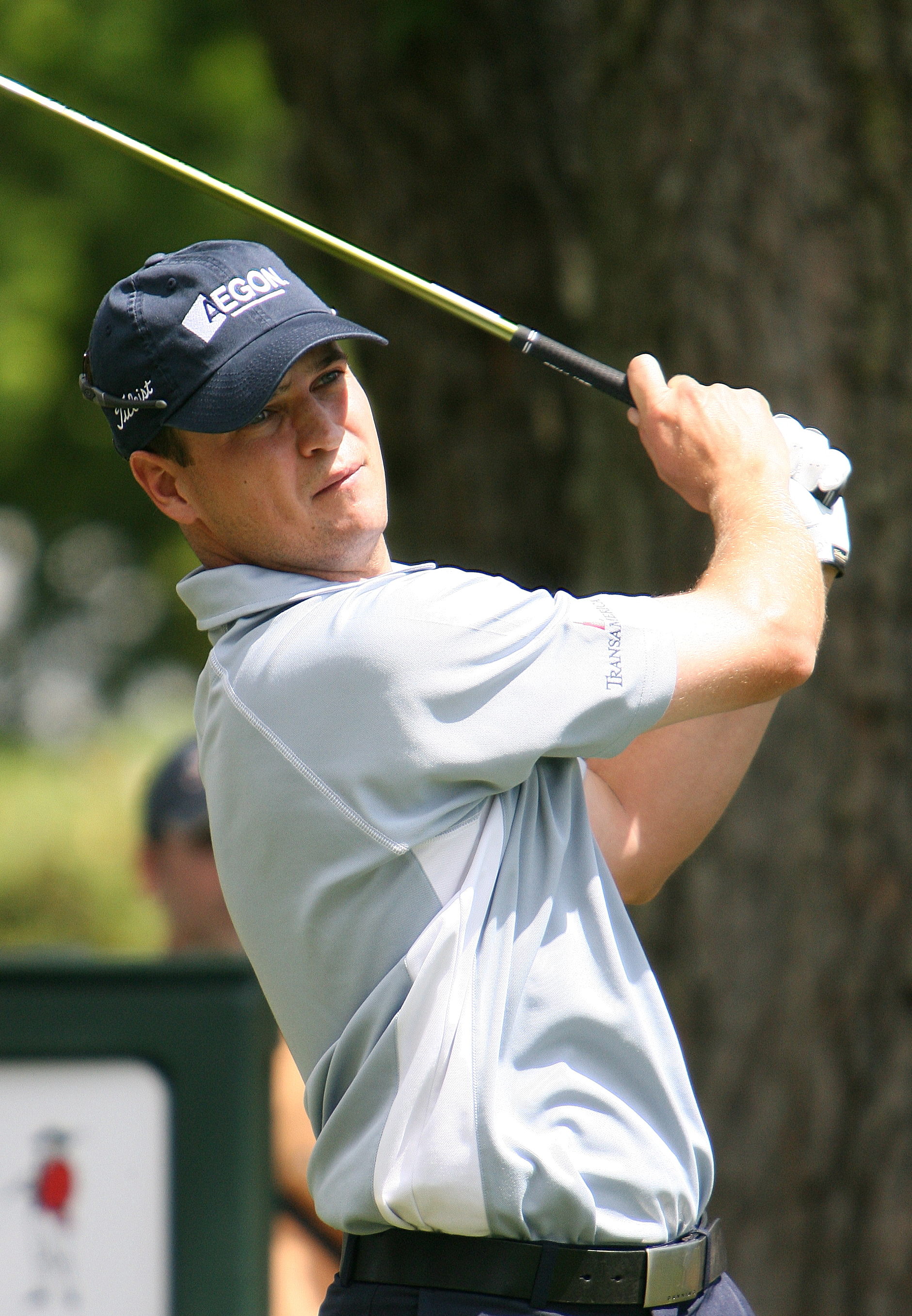
Zach Johnson

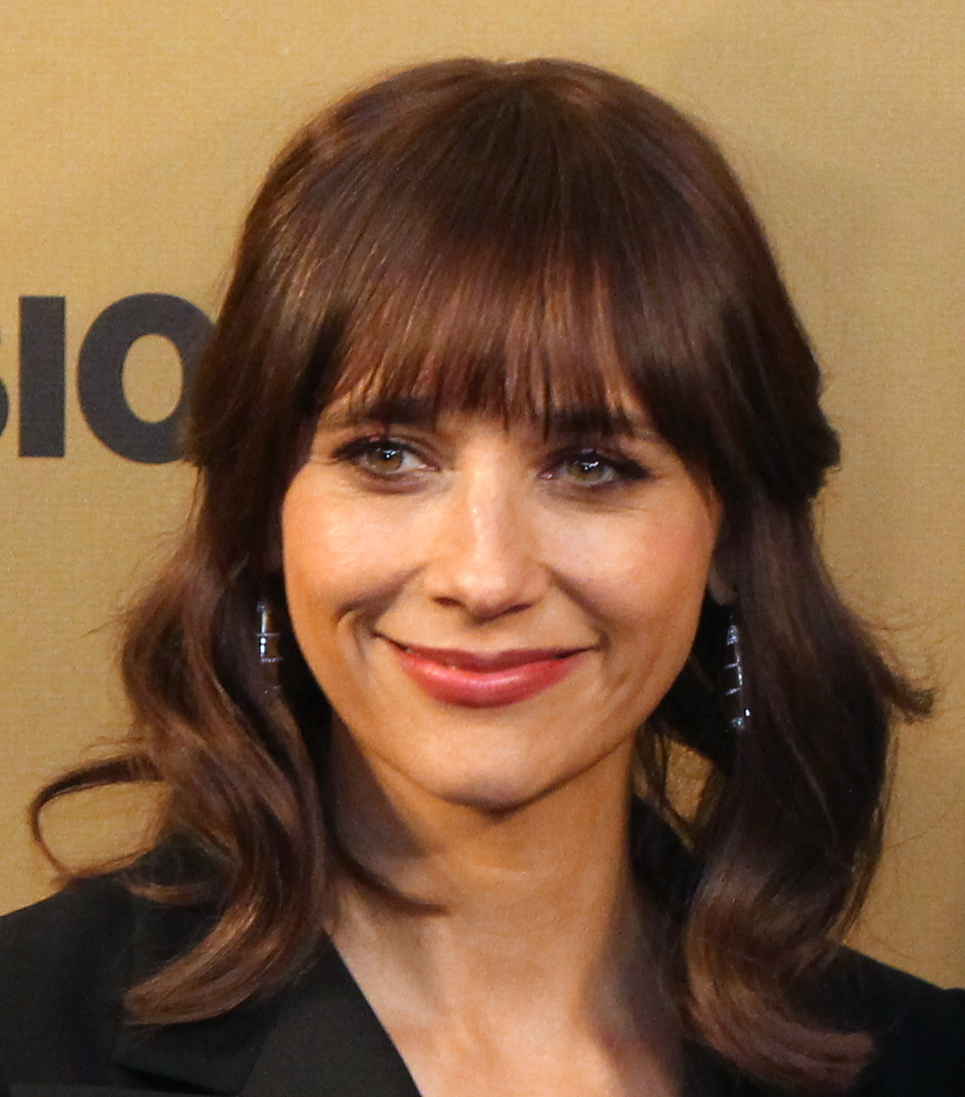
Rashida Jones

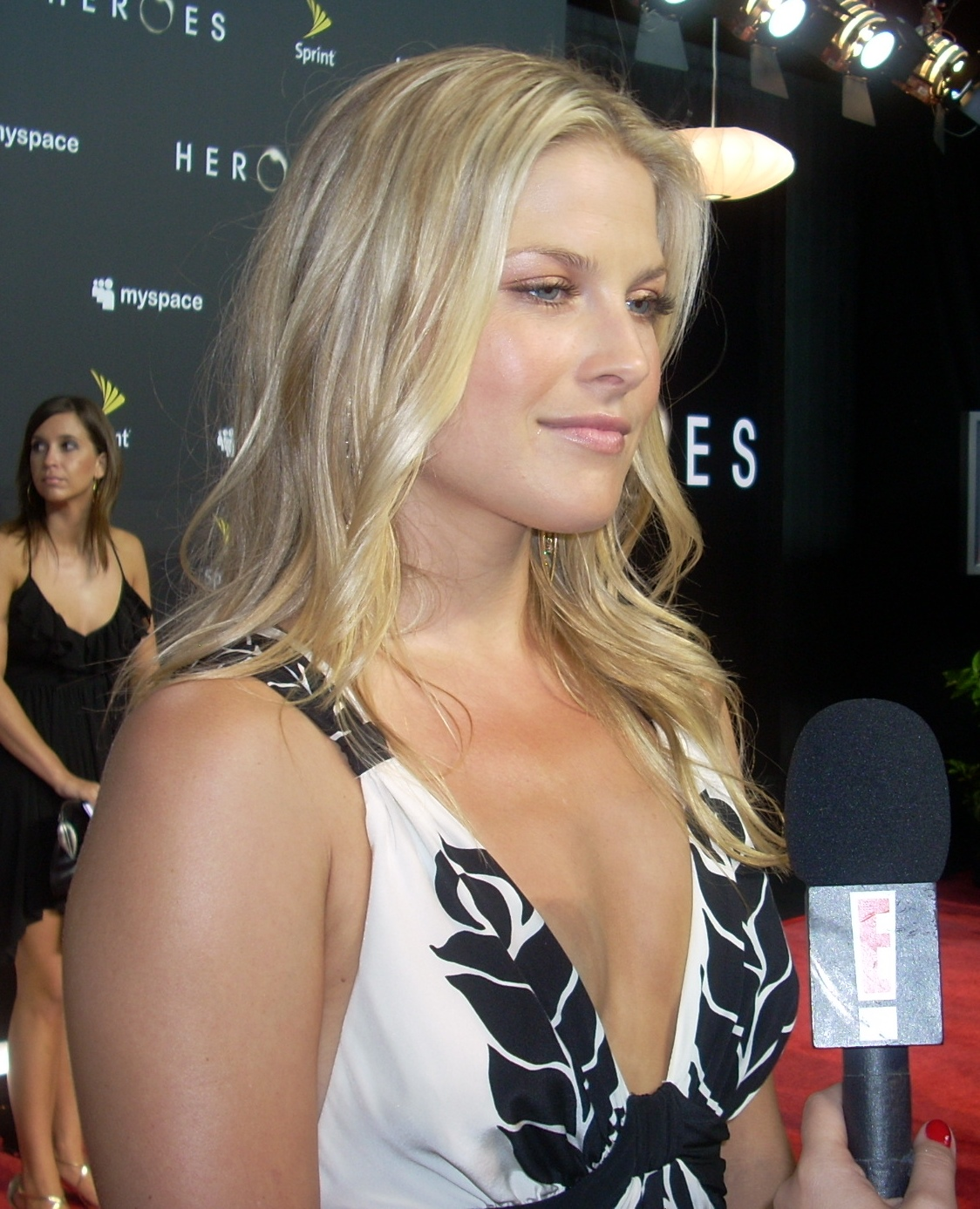
Ali Larter

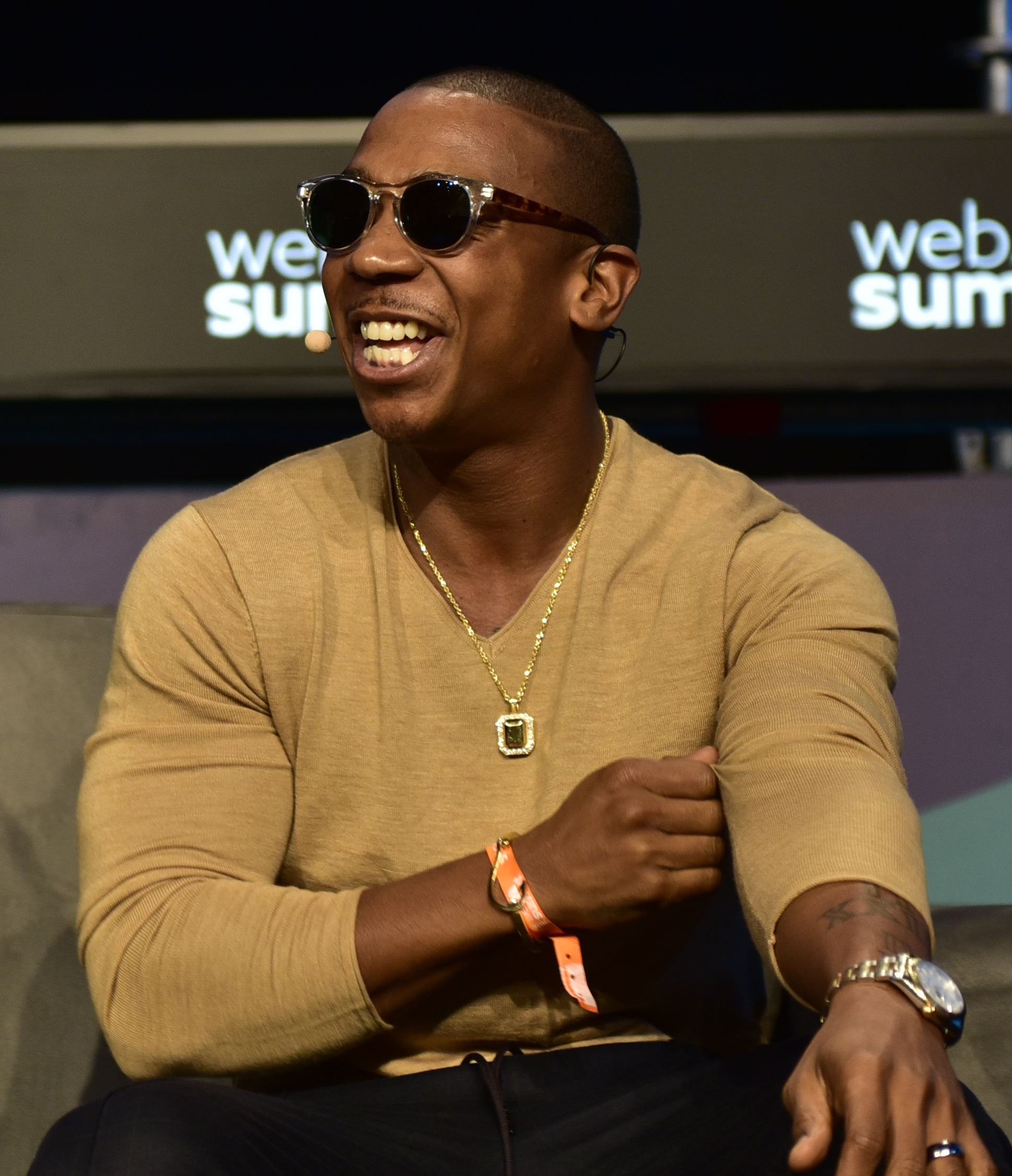
Ja Rule

- February 2
  - Ralph Biggs, American-born Belgian basketball player
  - Lori Beth Denberg, actress and comedian
- February 3
  - Mequitta Ahuja, painter
  - Tim Heidecker, comedian
- February 4 – Cam'ron, rapper
- February 5
  - Martin D. Burke, chemist
  - Jaime Harrison, attorney and politician
  - Brian Moorman, football player
- February 6
  - Ksenia Anske, Russian-born author and novelist
  - James Hiroyuki Liao, actor
  - Kim Zmeskal, Olympic gymnast
- February 9
  - Steve Burguiere, radio producer and personality
  - Charlie Day, actor
- February 10
  - Lance Berkman, baseball player and coach
  - Gonzalo Lopez, fugitive, mass murderer, and prison escapee (d. 2022)
- February 11
  - Tony Battie, basketball player
  - Brice Beckham, actor
  - Jason Miyares, politician
- February 12
  - Anna Benson, model
  - Jeff Brandes, politician
- February 14
  - Big Smo, country rapper
  - Erica Leerhsen, actress
- February 15
  - Barbara Birley, American-born British archaeologist and curator
  - Brandon Boyd, singer/songwriter and frontman for Incubus
- February 16
  - Eric Byrnes, baseball player and analyst
  - Janet Varney, actress and comedian
- February 17 – Scott Williamson, baseball player and coach
- February 20
  - Steve Brown, yo-yo player
  - Chris Cillizza, journalist
- February 21 – Frayser Boy, rapper
- February 22 – Kurt Braunohler, comedian
- February 23 – Scott Elarton, baseball player and coach
- February 24
  - Crista Flanagan, actress and screenwriter
  - Zach Johnson, golfer
  - Matt Skiba, singer/songwriter, guitarist, and frontman for Alkaline Trio
- February 25
  - Adrian Ballinger, British-born mountain climber and guide
  - Rashida Jones, actress, writer, model, and musician
- February 26 – Dan Goldman, attorney and politician
- February 27
  - Ryan Armour, golfer
  - Tony Gonzalez, football player
- February 28
  - Ali Larter, actress and model
- February 29
  - Ja Rule, rapper
  - Shane Johnson, actor

=== March ===
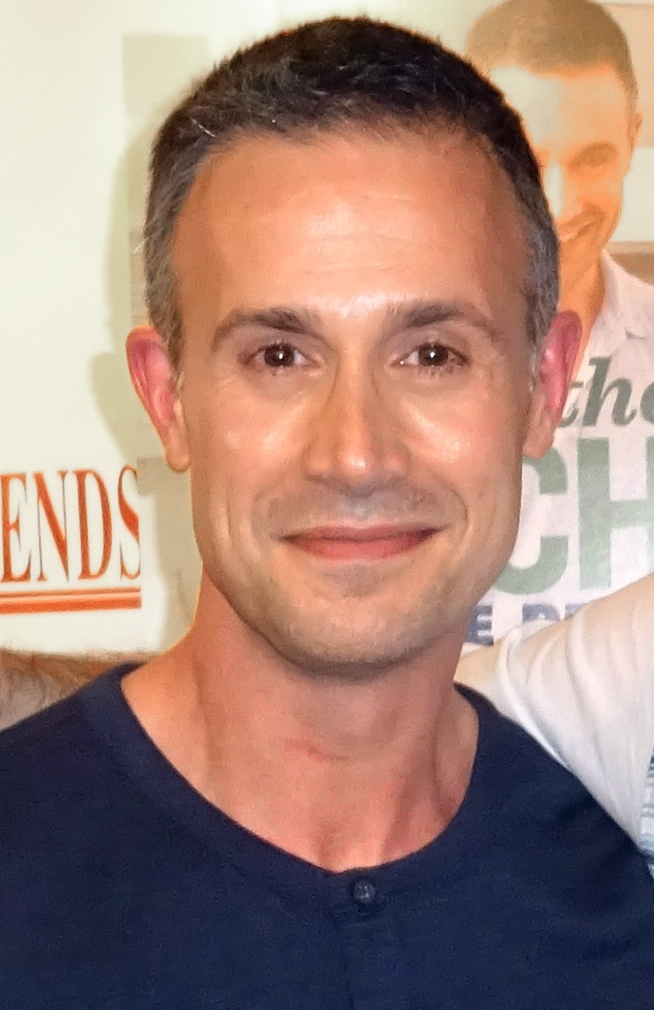
Freddie Prinze Jr.

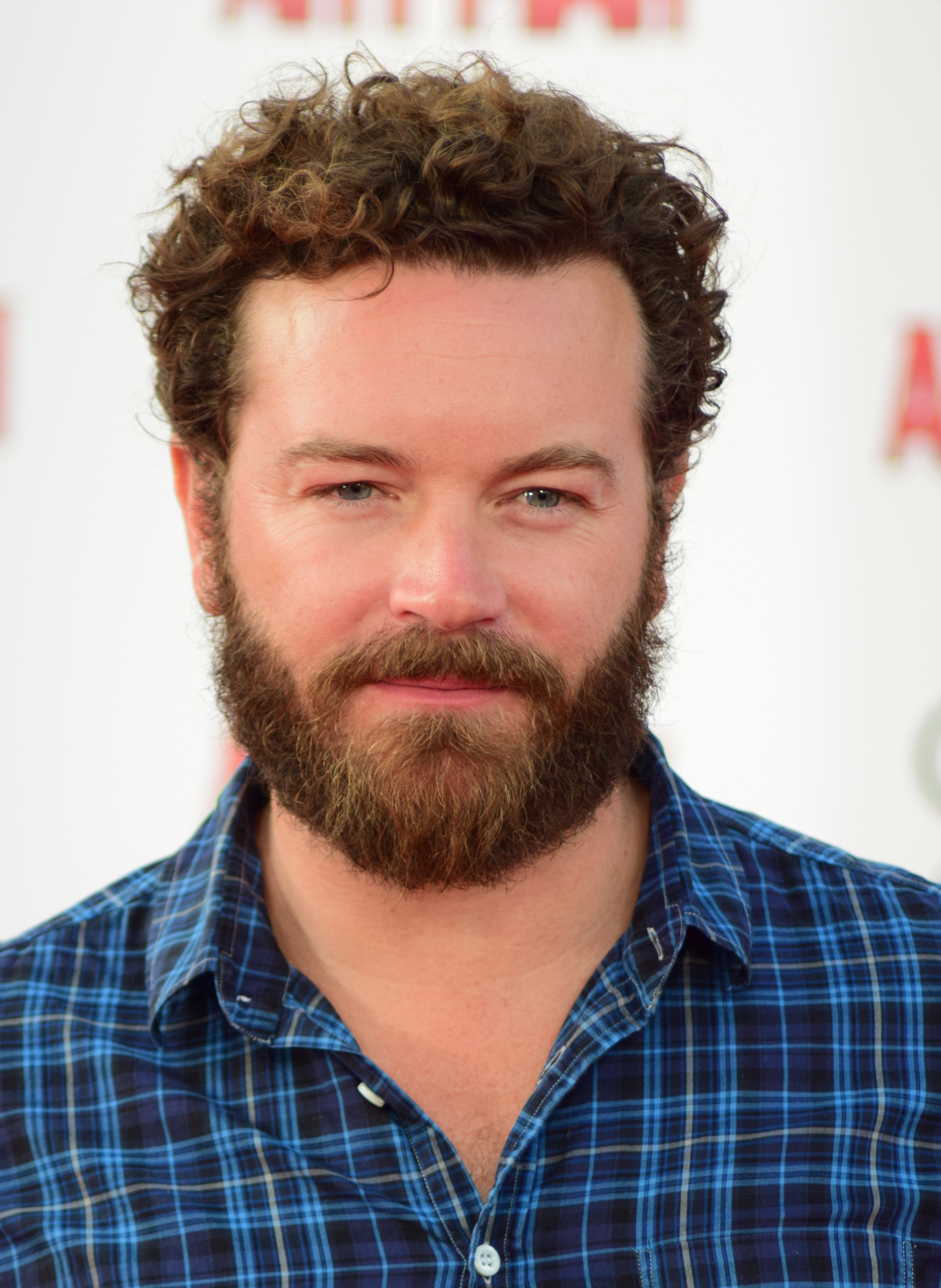
Danny Masterson

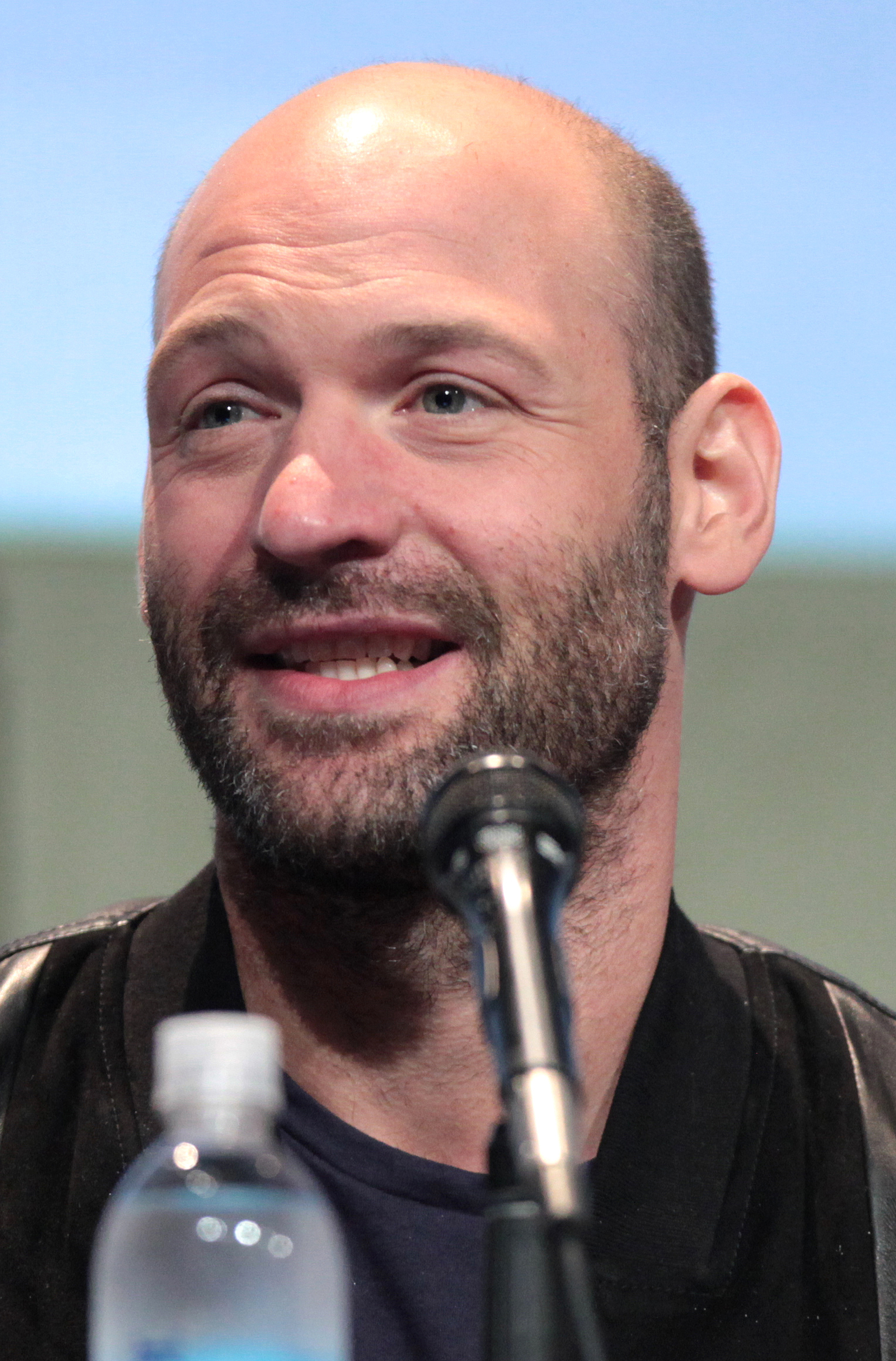
Corey Stoll

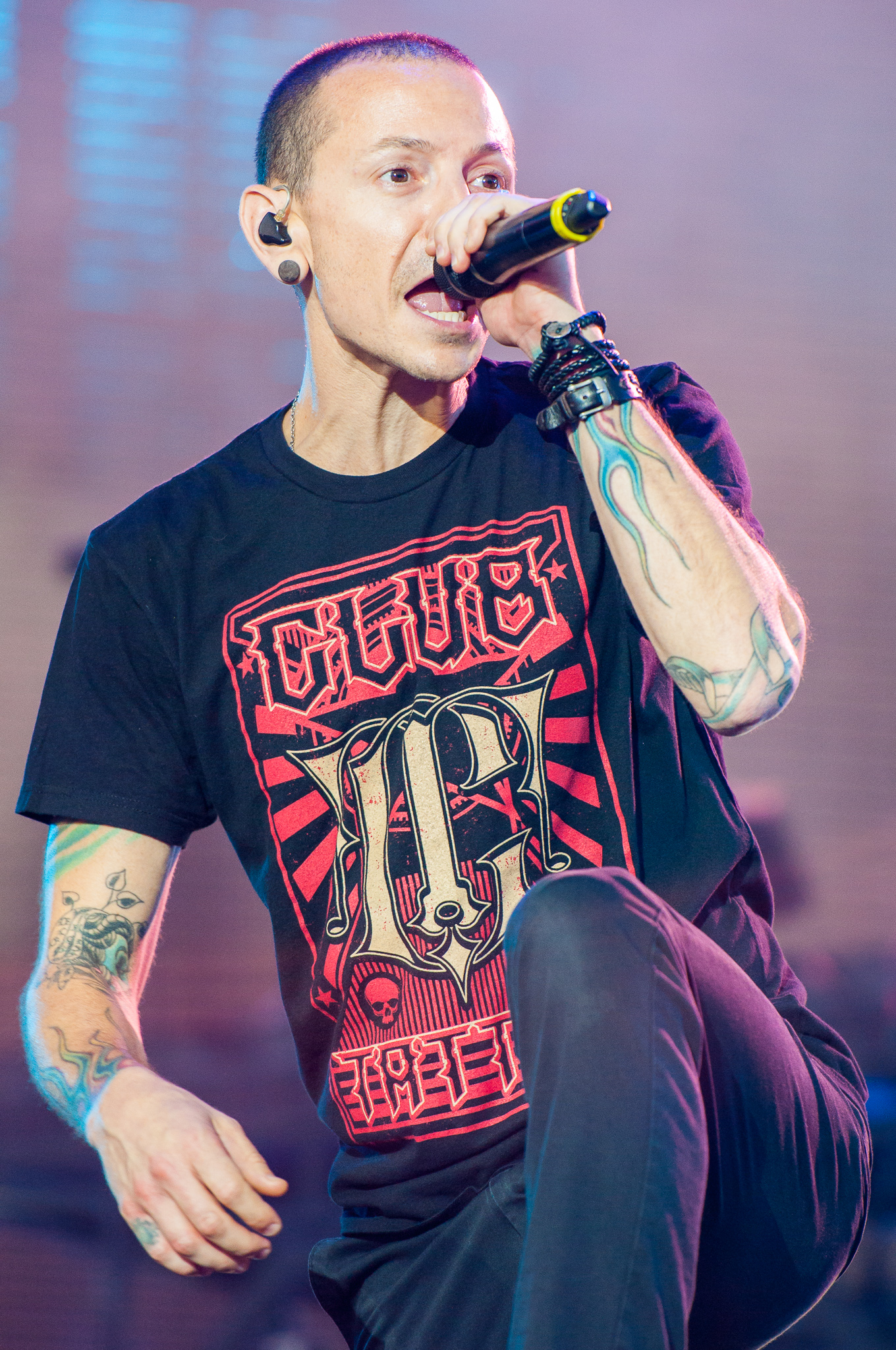
Chester Bennington

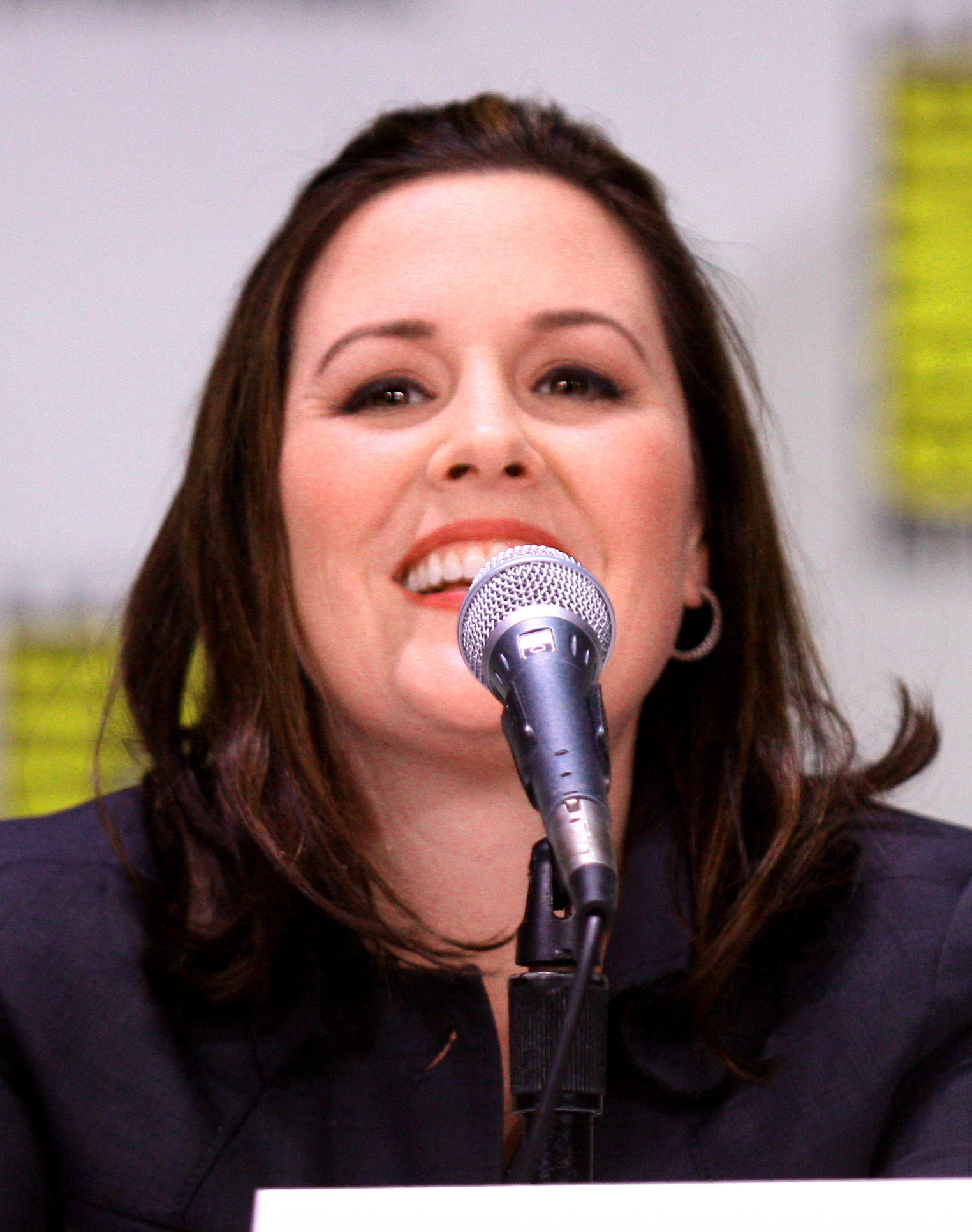
Rachael MacFarlane

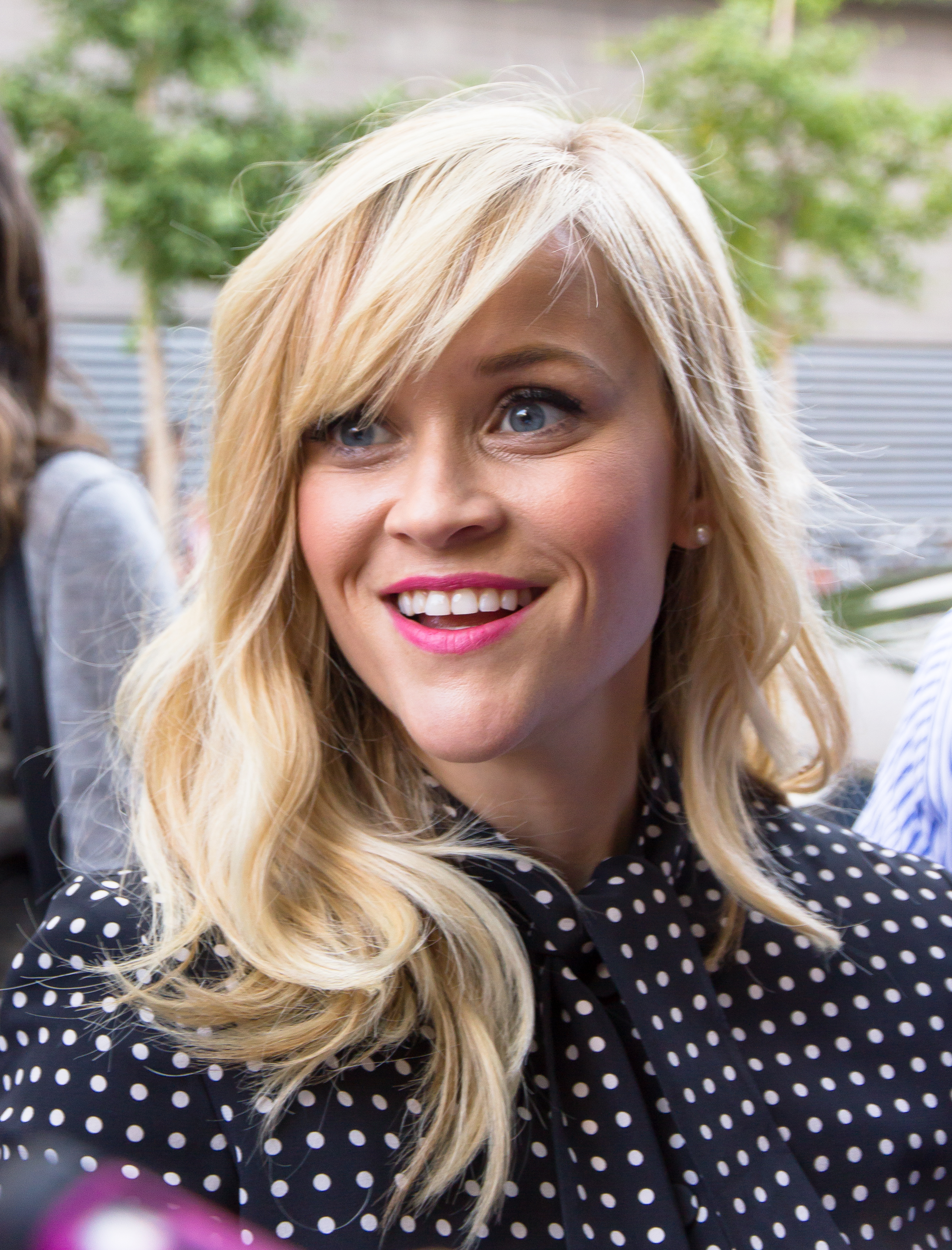
Reese Witherspoon

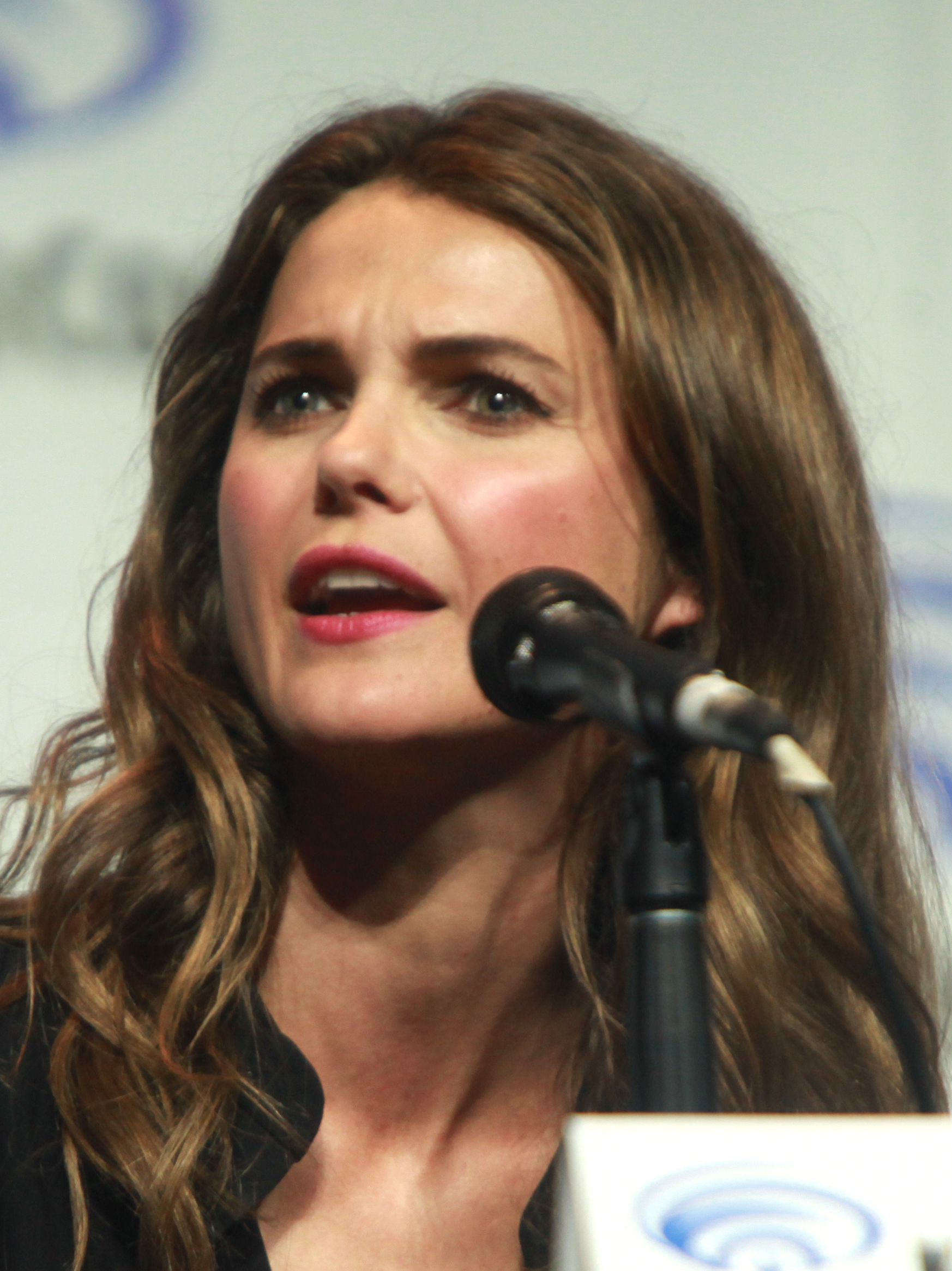
Keri Russell

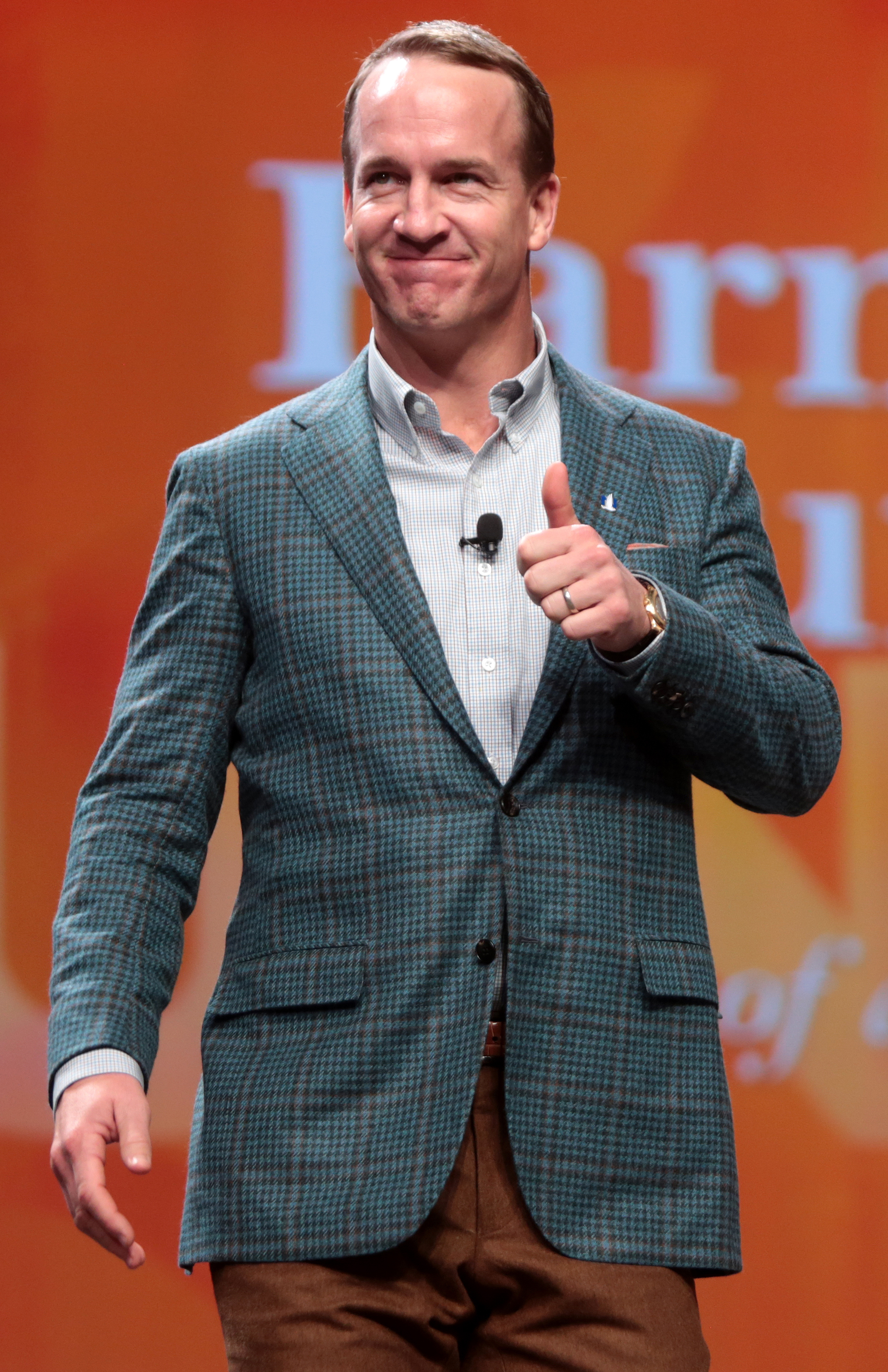
Peyton Manning

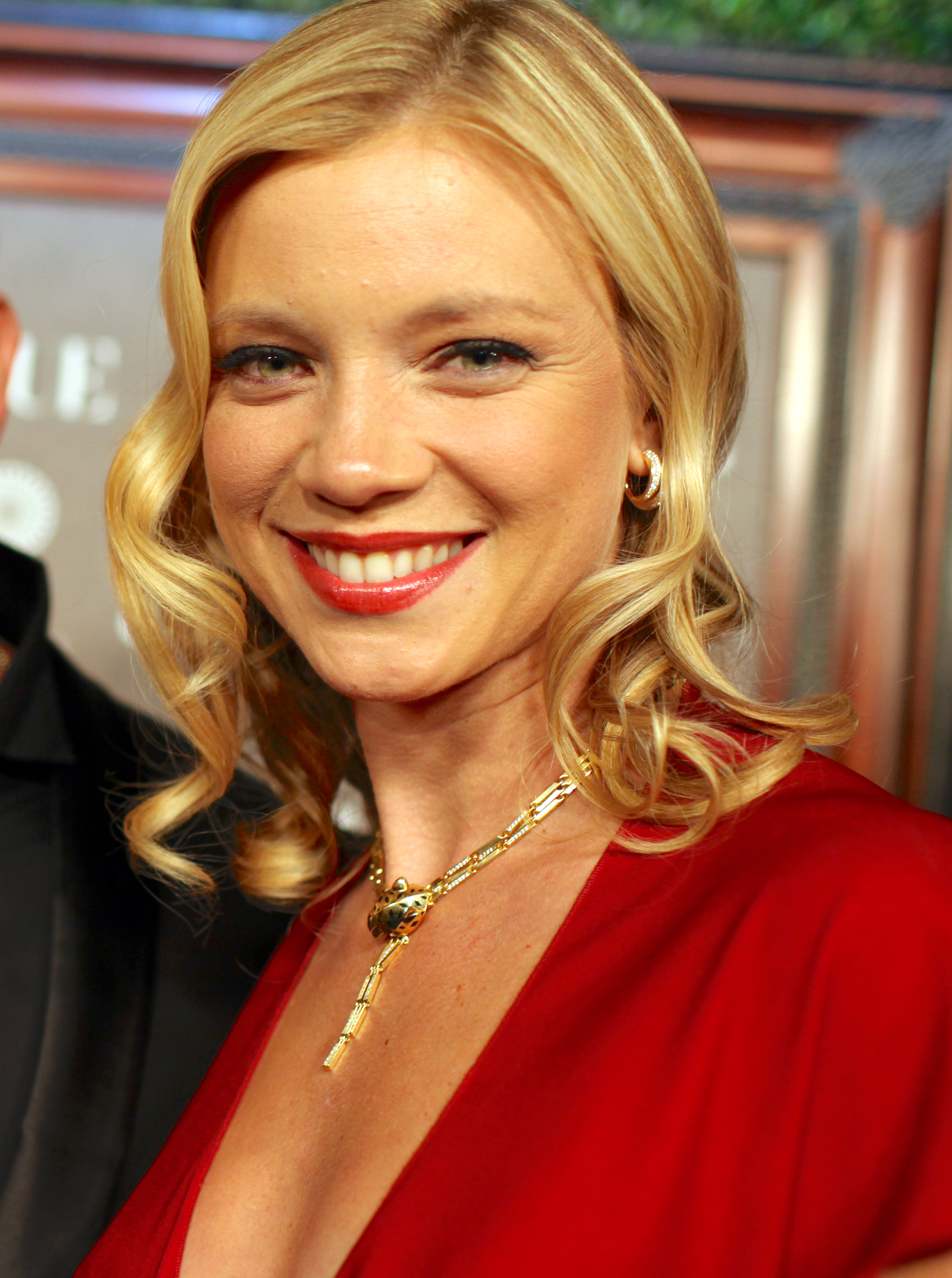
Amy Smart

- March 1
  - Marte Alexander, American-born Italian basketball player
  - Antron Brown, drag racer
  - Jason Santos, restauranteur, chef, author, and television personality
- March 3
  - Charlie Bethel, judge
  - Bobby Brooks, football player
  - Jill Tokuda, politician
- March 4
  - Mack Bernard, Haitian-born politician
  - Sean Covel, producer
- March 5
  - 88-Keys, record producer and rapper
  - Paul Konerko, baseball player
  - Dave Min, politician
- March 6 – Ken Anderson, wrestler
- March 8
  - Freddie Prinze Jr., actor
  - Doug Larsen, U.S. Army Lieutenant Colonel and politician (d. 2023)
- March 9 – Jeremiah Bishop, mountain bike racer
- March 10 – Christa Pike, convicted murderer and the youngest woman to be sentenced to death
- March 11 – Doug Brzezinski, football player
- March 12
  - Kulsoom Abdullah, American-born Pakistani weightlifter
  - Hisham Bharoocha, musician and visual artist
  - Francesco Biancamano, football player
- March 13
  - Marlon Barnes, football player
  - Josh Bidwell, football player
  - James Dewees, musician
  - Danny Masterson, actor
  - Jamie Pressnall, tap dancer and musician
- March 14
  - Robert Baker, football player
  - Brian Quinn, actor
  - Merlin Santana, actor (d. 2002)
  - Corey Stoll, actor
- March 15 – Katherine Brooks, writer and director
- March 16 – Blu Cantrell, R&B singer
- March 17 – Brittany and Cynthia Daniel, actresses and twin sisters
- March 18
  - Eugene Baker, football player
  - Justin Bolli, golfer
  - FanFan, American-born Taiwanese singer/songwriter
  - Eric Sorensen, meteorologist and politician
- March 19
  - Derek Chauvin, police officer who murdered George Floyd
  - Andre Miller, basketball player
  - De'aundre Bonds, actor
- March 20 – Chester Bennington, singer and frontman for Linkin Park (d. 2017)
- March 21
  - Gabrielle Bell, British-born cartoonist
  - Rachael MacFarlane, actress and singer, sister of Seth MacFarlane
- March 22
  - Rahim Abdullah, football player
  - Judson Laipply, comedian
  - Shawty Lo, rapper (d. 2016)
  - Kathryn Jean Lopez, journalist
  - Wayne Turner, basketball player
  - Kellie Shanygne Williams, actress
  - Reese Witherspoon, actress, producer and entrepreneur
- March 23
  - Jayson Blair, disgraced The New York Times reporter known for plagiarism and fabrication
  - Michelle Monaghan, actress
  - Jeremy Newberry, football player
  - Keri Russell, actress
- March 24
  - Aaron Brooks, football player
  - Peyton Manning, football player
- March 25
  - Somy Ali, Pakistani-born Bollywood actress, writer, filmmaker, model, and activist
  - Corey Arnold, photographer
  - Terry Babcock-Lumish, professor, entrepreneur, and policymaker
  - Jim Bianco, musician, singer/songwriter, and producer
  - Matt Burke, football coach
  - Domenick Lombardozzi, actor
- March 26
  - Blaise Alexander, automobile racing driver (d. 2001)
  - Amy Smart, actress and fashion model
  - Russel Vought, deputy director of the Office of Management and Budget (2018-2020)
- March 27
  - Michael Adams, politician
  - Jeff Bates, businessman and co-founder of Slashdot
  - Matt Bertani, ice hockey coach
  - Brandon Johnson, politician, mayor of Chicago, Illinois (2023-present)
- March 29
  - Scott Atchison, baseball player
  - Benjamin Bellas, artist
  - Jennifer Capriati, tennis player
- March 30
  - Jessica Cauffiel, actress and singer
  - Ty Conklin, ice hockey player
- March 31
  - Gabe Alberro, artist, writer, songwriter, and filmmaker
  - Josh Saviano, actor and lawyer

=== April ===
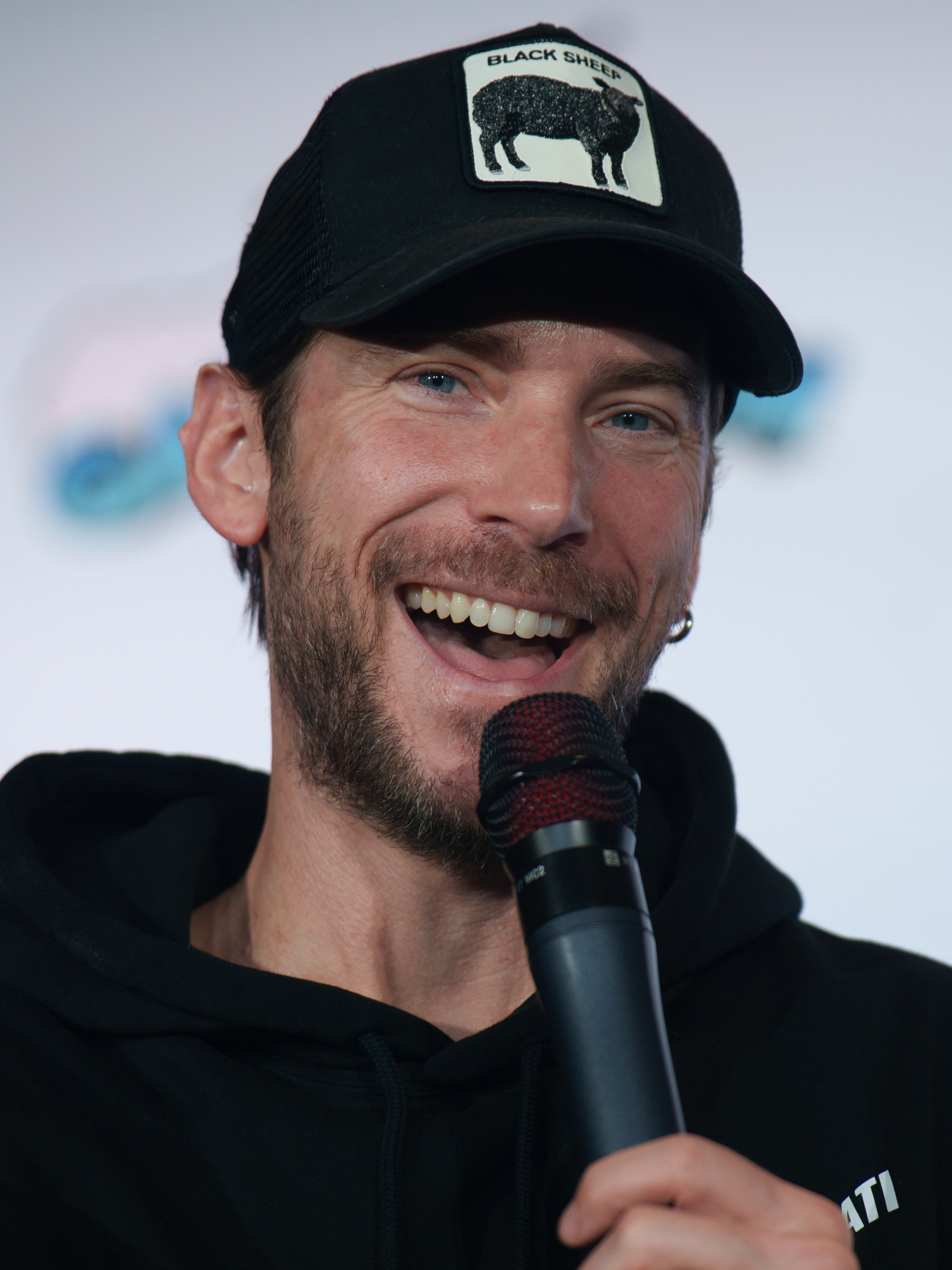
Troy Baker

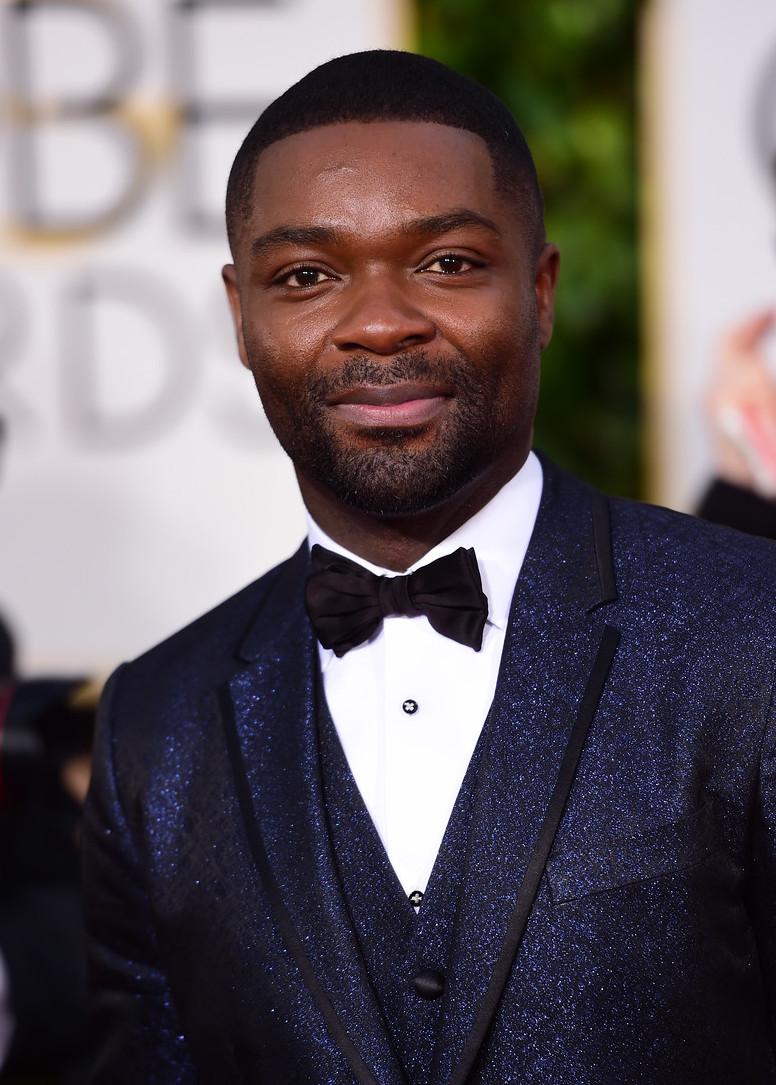
David Oyelowo

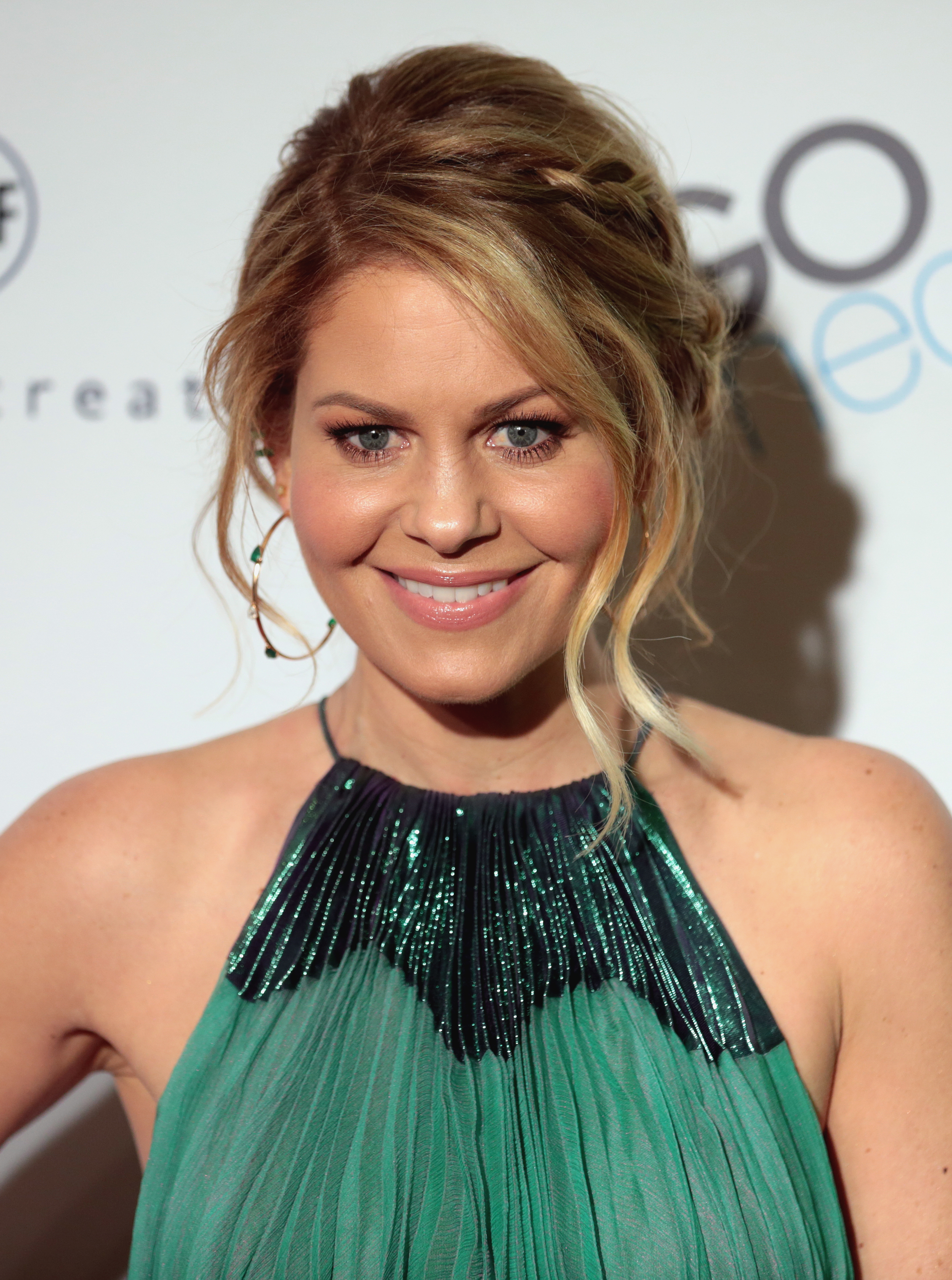
Candace Cameron Bure

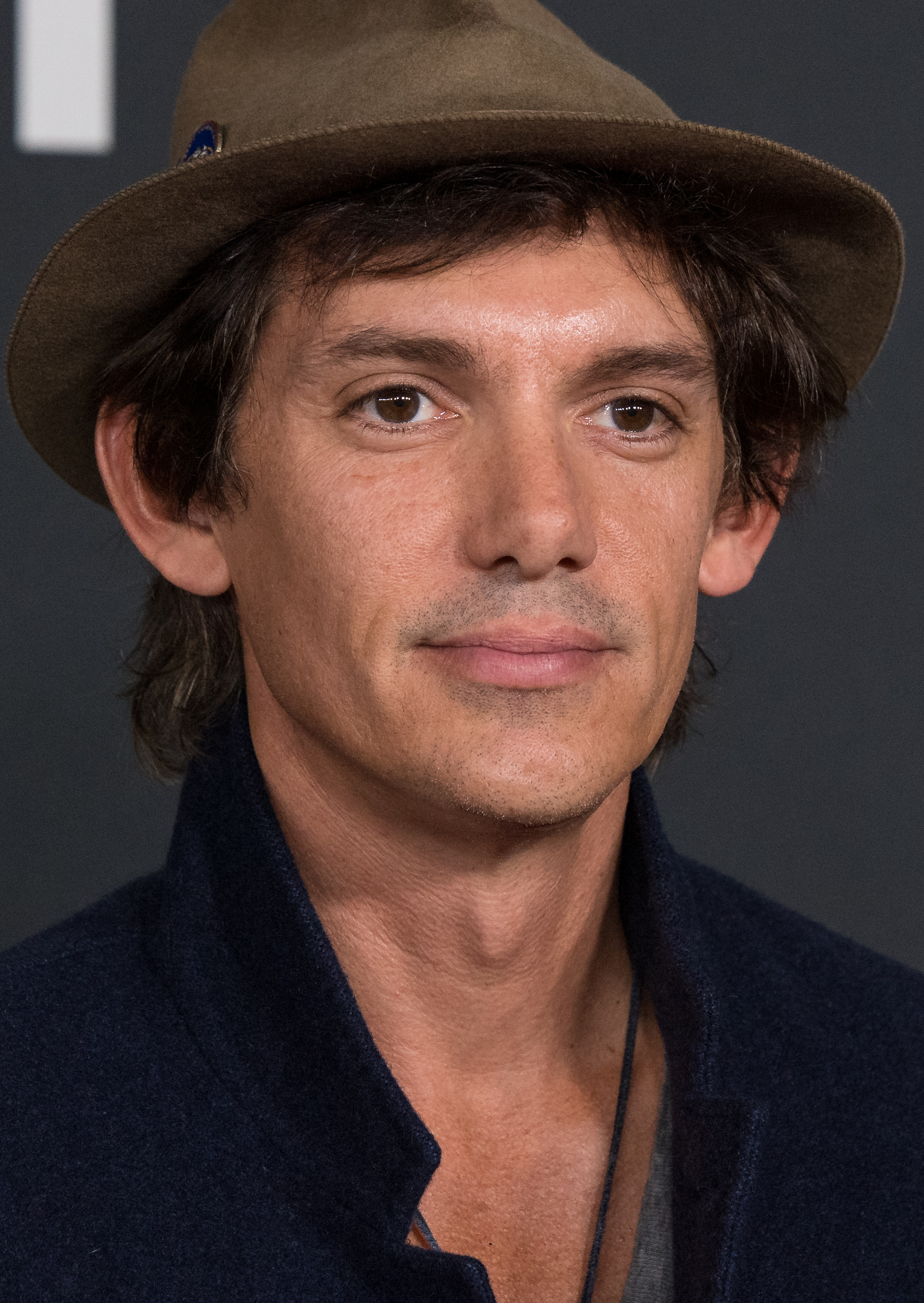
Lukas Haas

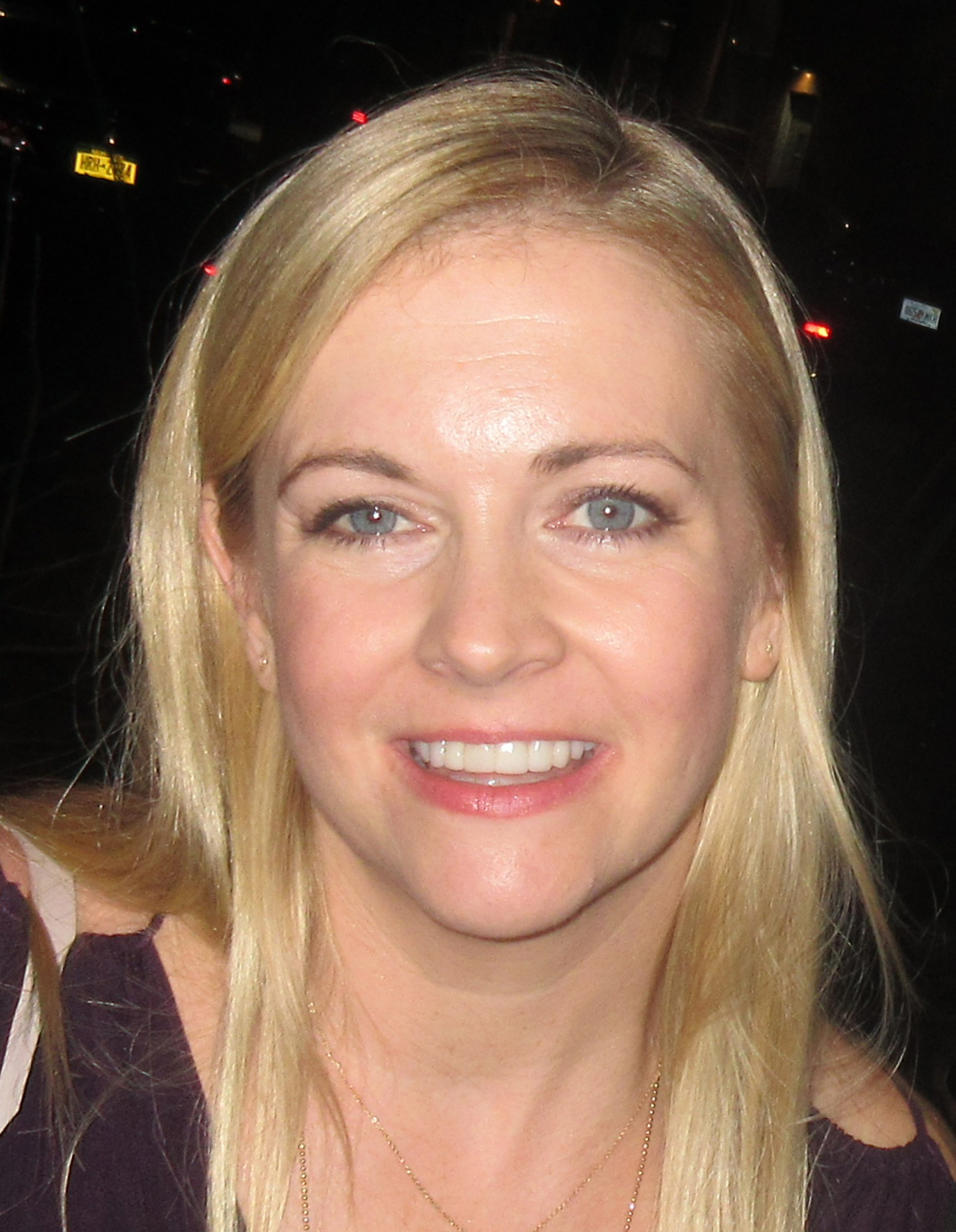
Melissa Joan Hart

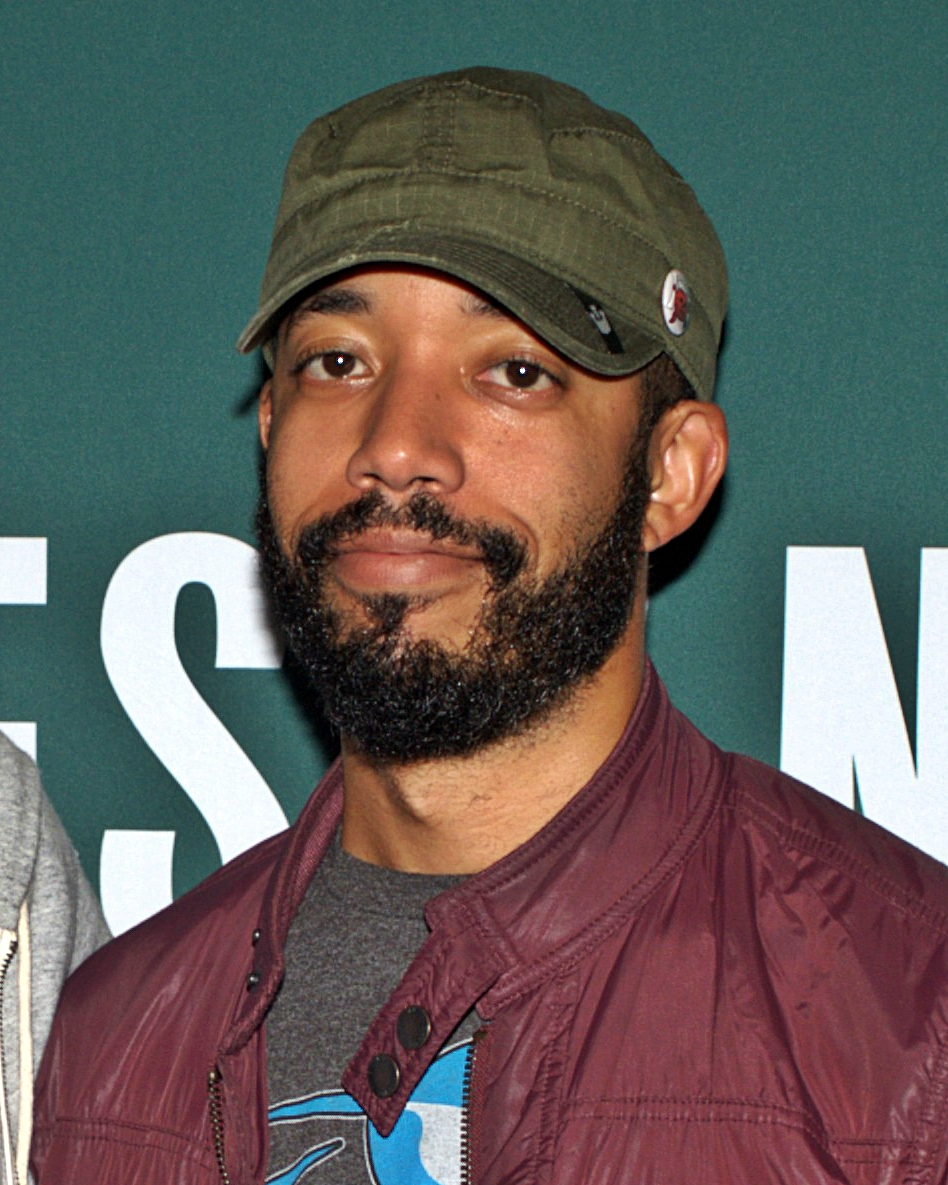
Wyatt Cenac

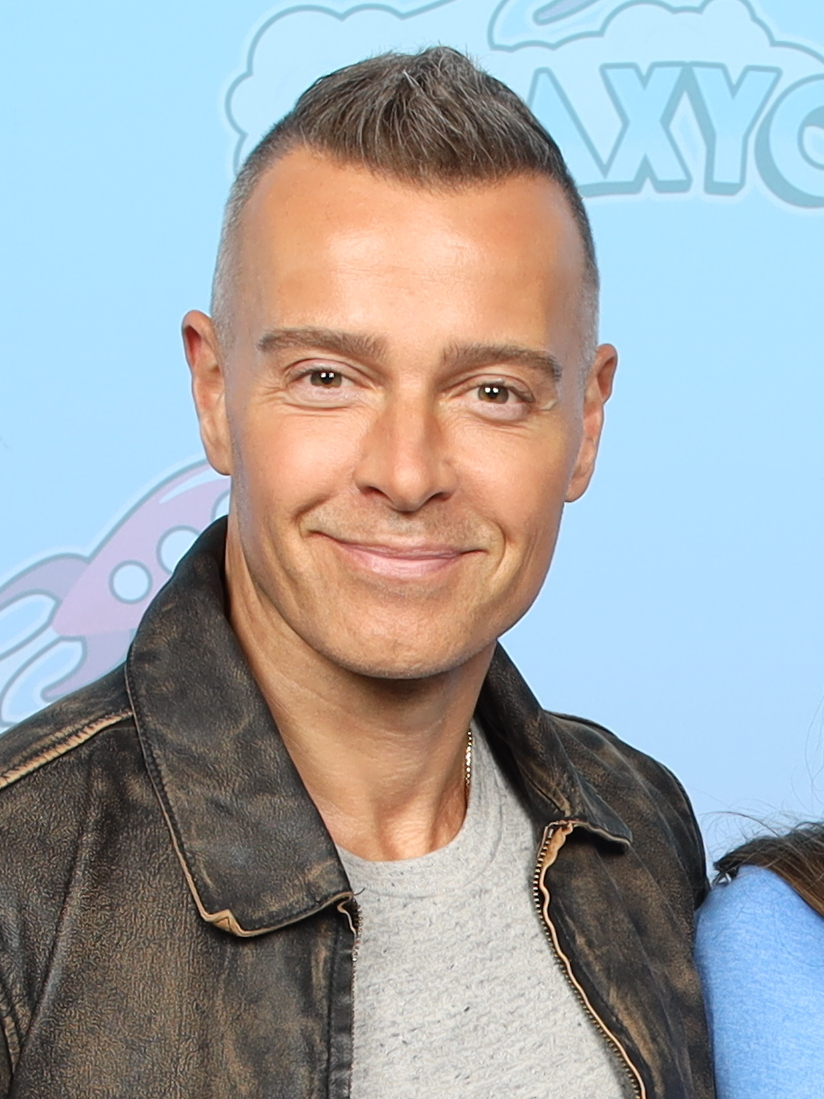
Joey Lawrence

- April 1
  - Troy Baker, actor and musician
  - Jamaal Bowman, politician
  - Evan Jones, actor
  - David Oyelowo, English-born actor
- April 2
  - Adam F. Goldberg, writer and producer
  - Aaron Lohr, actor
  - Evan McMullin, CIA operations officer and political candidate
- April 4 – James Roday Rodriguez, actor, director, and screenwriter
- April 5
  - Alias, hip-hop producer and founder of Anticon (d. 2018)
  - Matt Blank, baseball player
  - Sterling K. Brown, actor
- April 6
  - Sean Berens, ice hockey player and coach
  - Joseph Brent, musician
  - Candace Cameron Bure, actress
- April 7
  - Kevin Alejandro, director
  - Eric Wareheim, comedian
- April 9
  - Algebra, R&B singer
  - Serena Auñón-Chancellor, astronaut
  - Blayne Weaver, actor and filmmaker
- April 10
  - Dann Battistone, tennis player
  - Robert J. O'Neill, Navy SEAL, news contributor, author, and the individual who killed Osama bin Laden
- April 11 – Cory Brandan, singer and frontman for Norma Jean
- April 13
  - John D. Anthony, politician
  - Jonathan Brandis, actor (d. 2003)
  - Dan Campbell, football player and coach
  - Glenn Howerton, actor
- April 14
  - Mark Born, politician
  - Jericho Brown, poet and writer
  - Anna DeForge, basketball player
- April 15
  - Jason Bonsignore, ice hockey player
  - Brock Huard, football player
- April 16
  - Phil Baroni, mixed martial artist and wrestler
  - Lukas Haas, actor and musician
  - Kelli O'Hara, actress and singer
- April 17 – Monet Mazur, actress
- April 18
  - Octavia Blue, basketball player
  - Gavin Creel, actor and singer/songwriter (d. 2024)
  - Melissa Joan Hart, actress, producer and director
  - Kevin Rankin, actor
- April 19
  - Lionel Barnes, football player
  - Wyatt Cenac, actor, writer, and director
- April 20 – Joey Lawrence, actor, musician, and game show host
- April 21
  - Cecilia Ballí, journalist and anthropologist
  - Darrius Blevins, football player
- April 22 – Mark Byington, basketball player and coach
- April 23 – Cesar Blanco, politician
- April 24
  - John Barnes, baseball player
  - George P. Bush, attorney and politician
  - Mike Garcia, politician
- April 25 – Tim Duncan, basketball player
- April 27
  - Chad Alban, ice hockey player
  - Blaze Ya Dead Homie, rapper
- April 28 – Michael Carbonaro, actor, magician, and improv artist
- April 29 – Max Abramson, politician
- April 30
  - Amanda Palmer, singer/songwriter
  - Scott Savol, singer

=== May ===
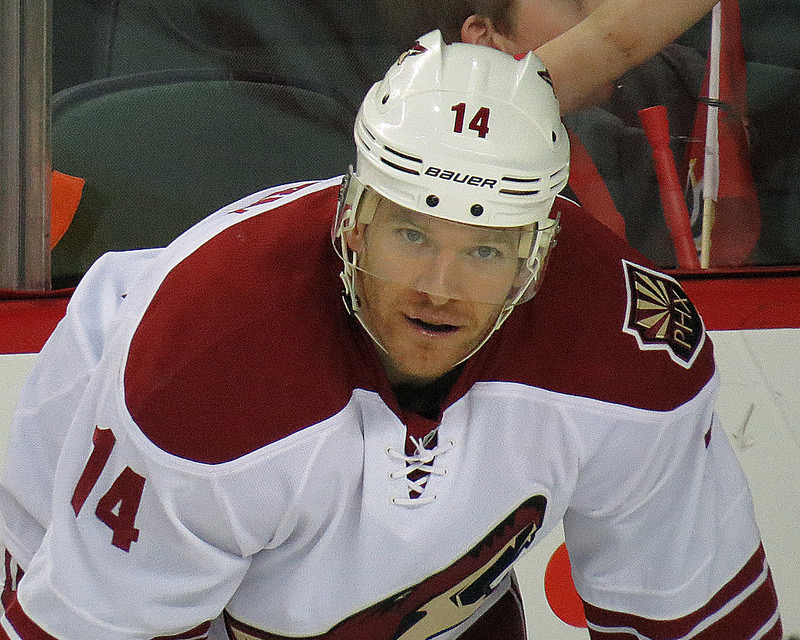
Jeff Halpern

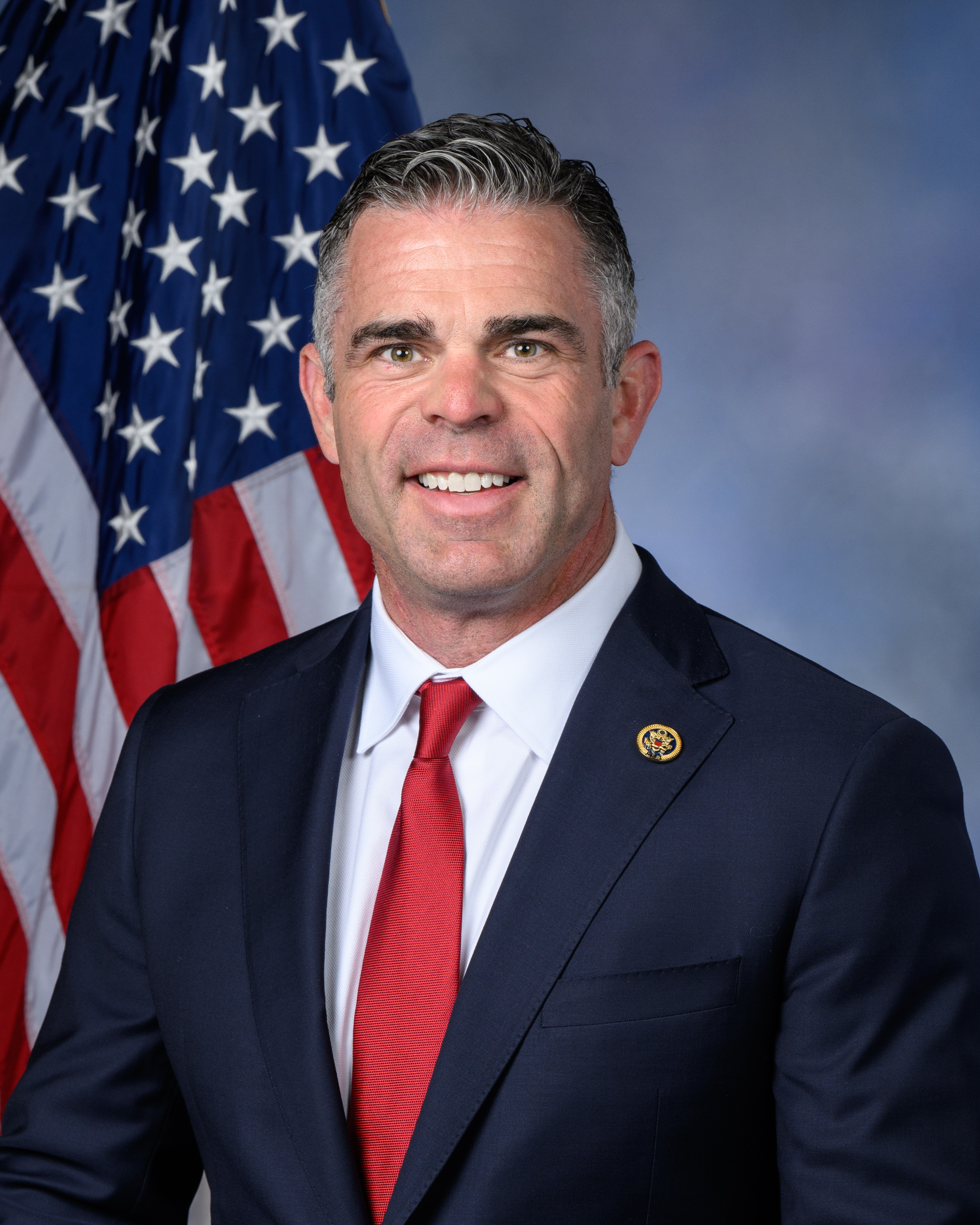
Tony Wied

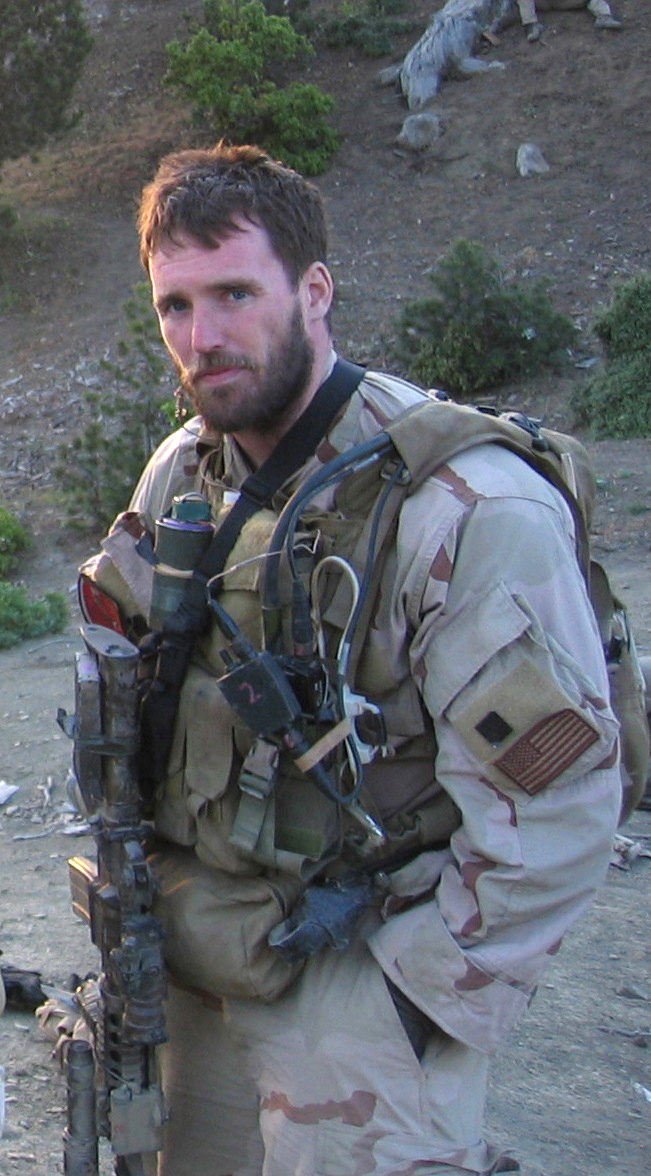
Michael P. Murphy

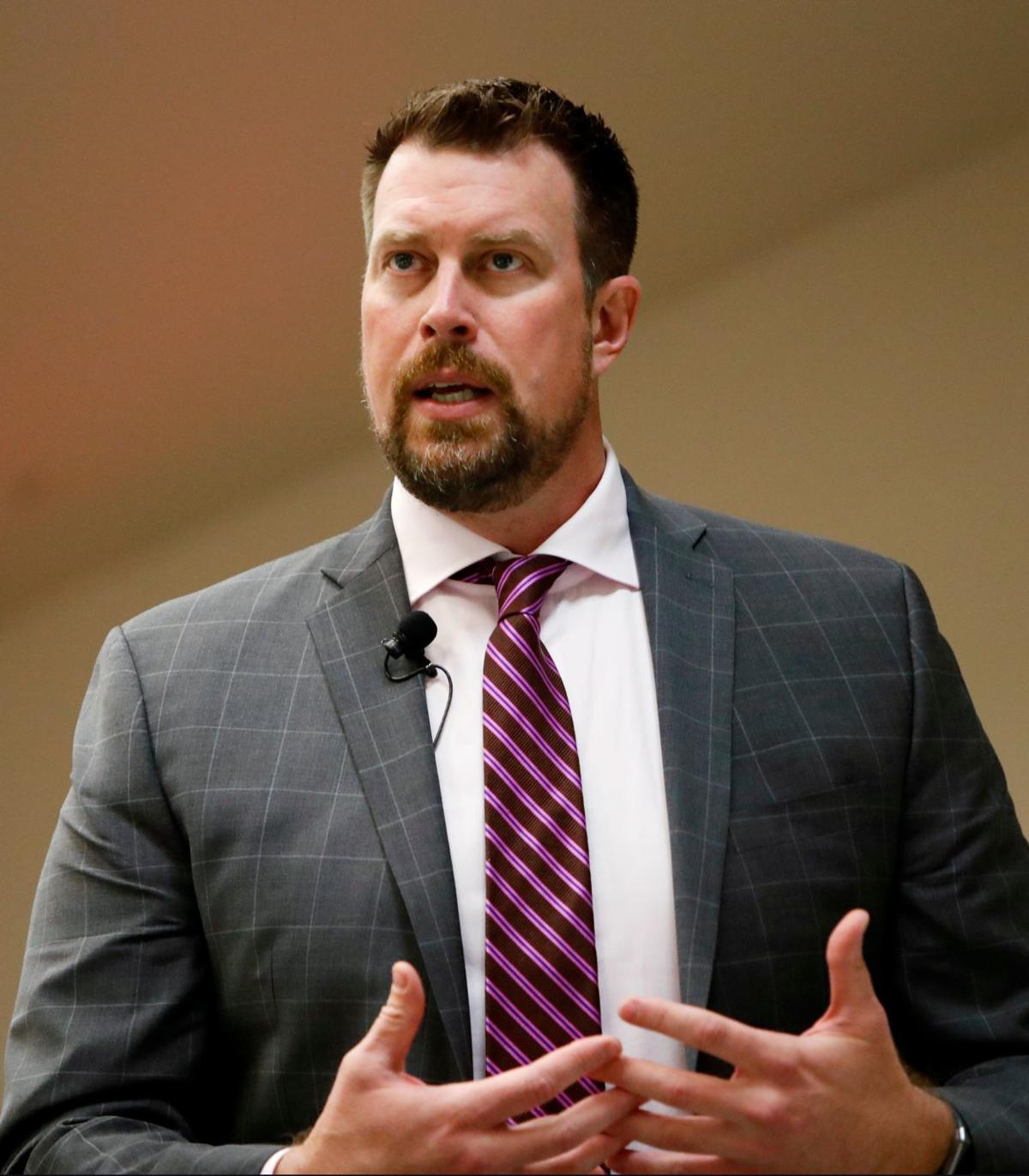
Ryan Leaf

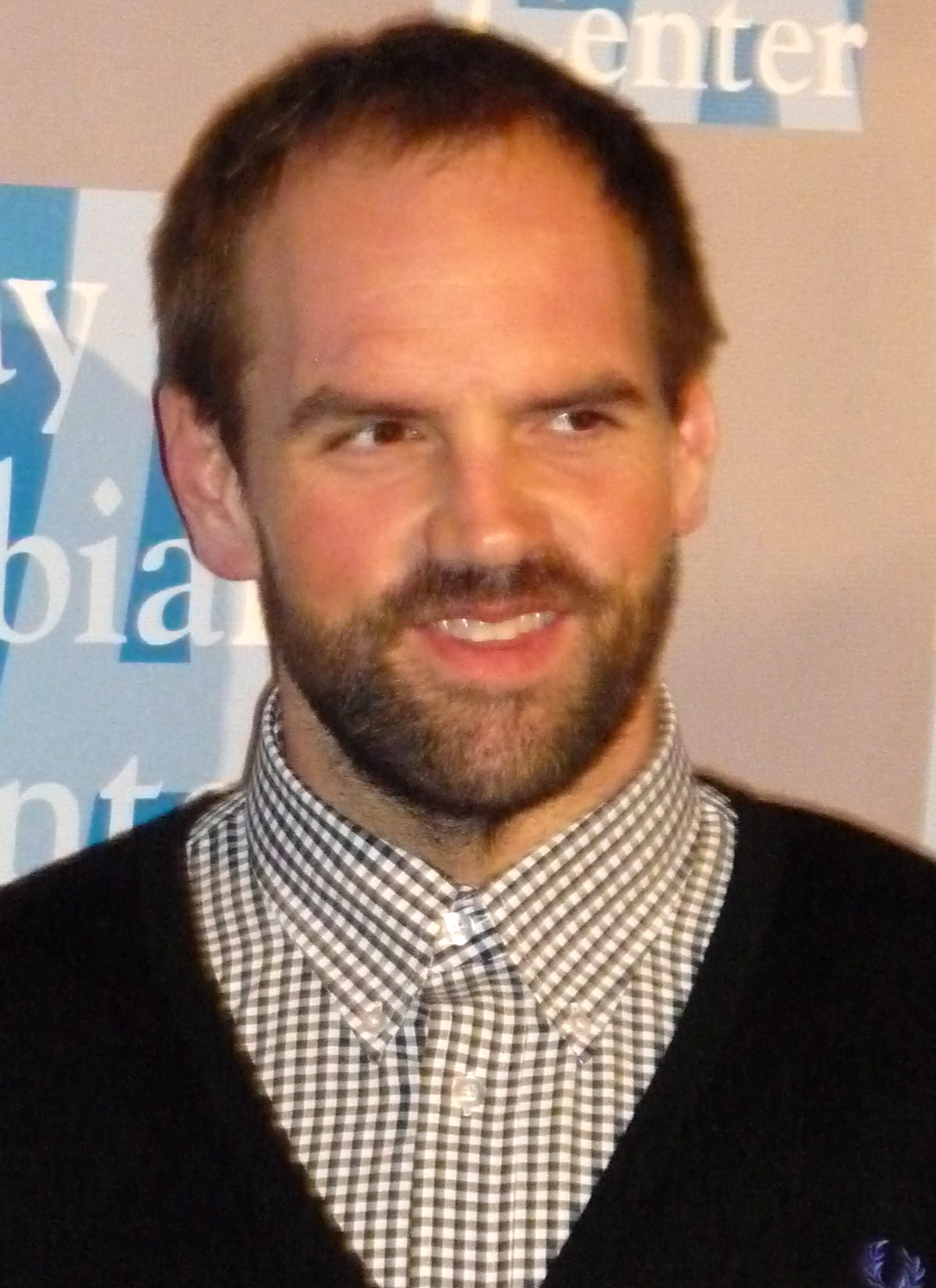
Ethan Suplee

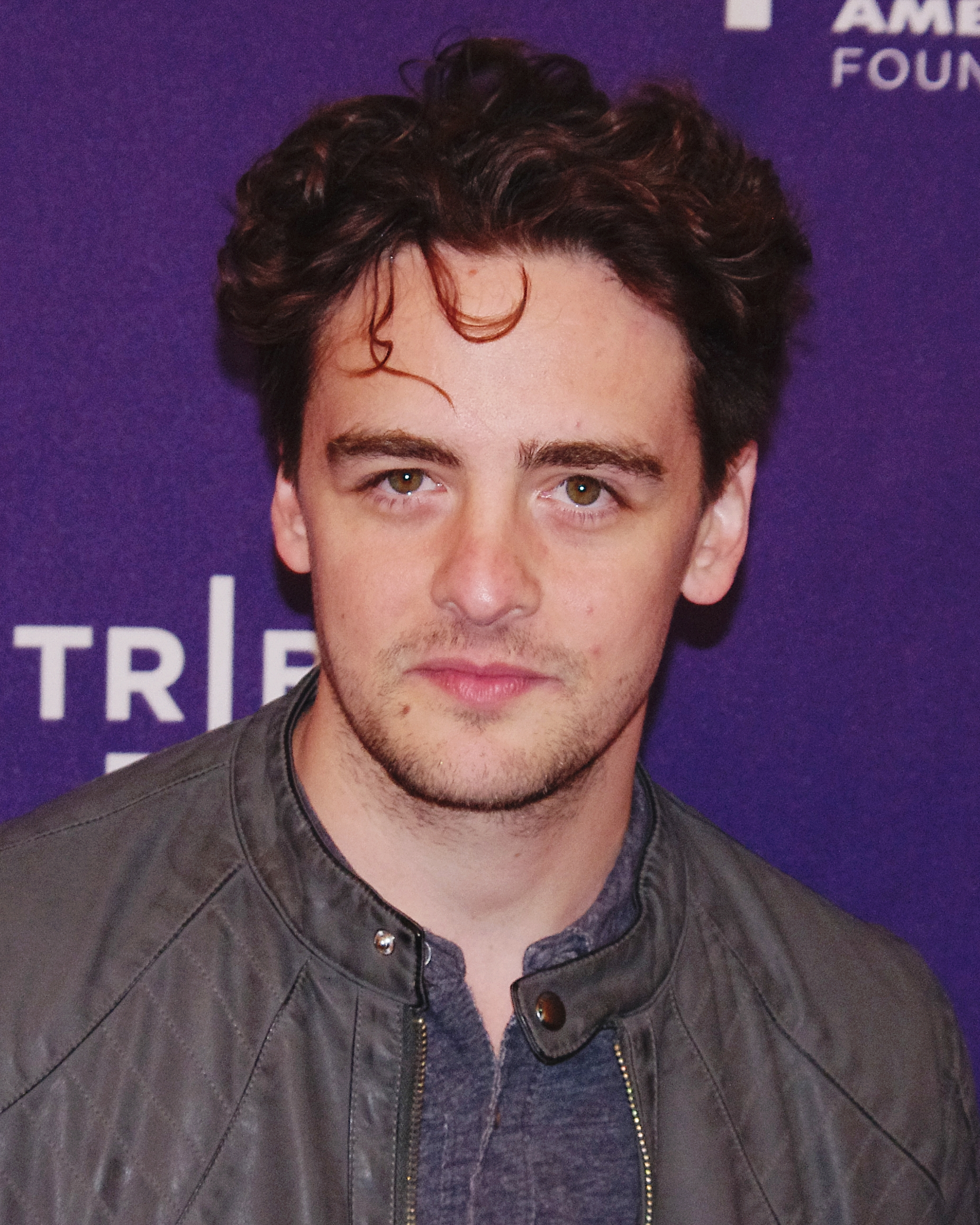
Vincent Piazza

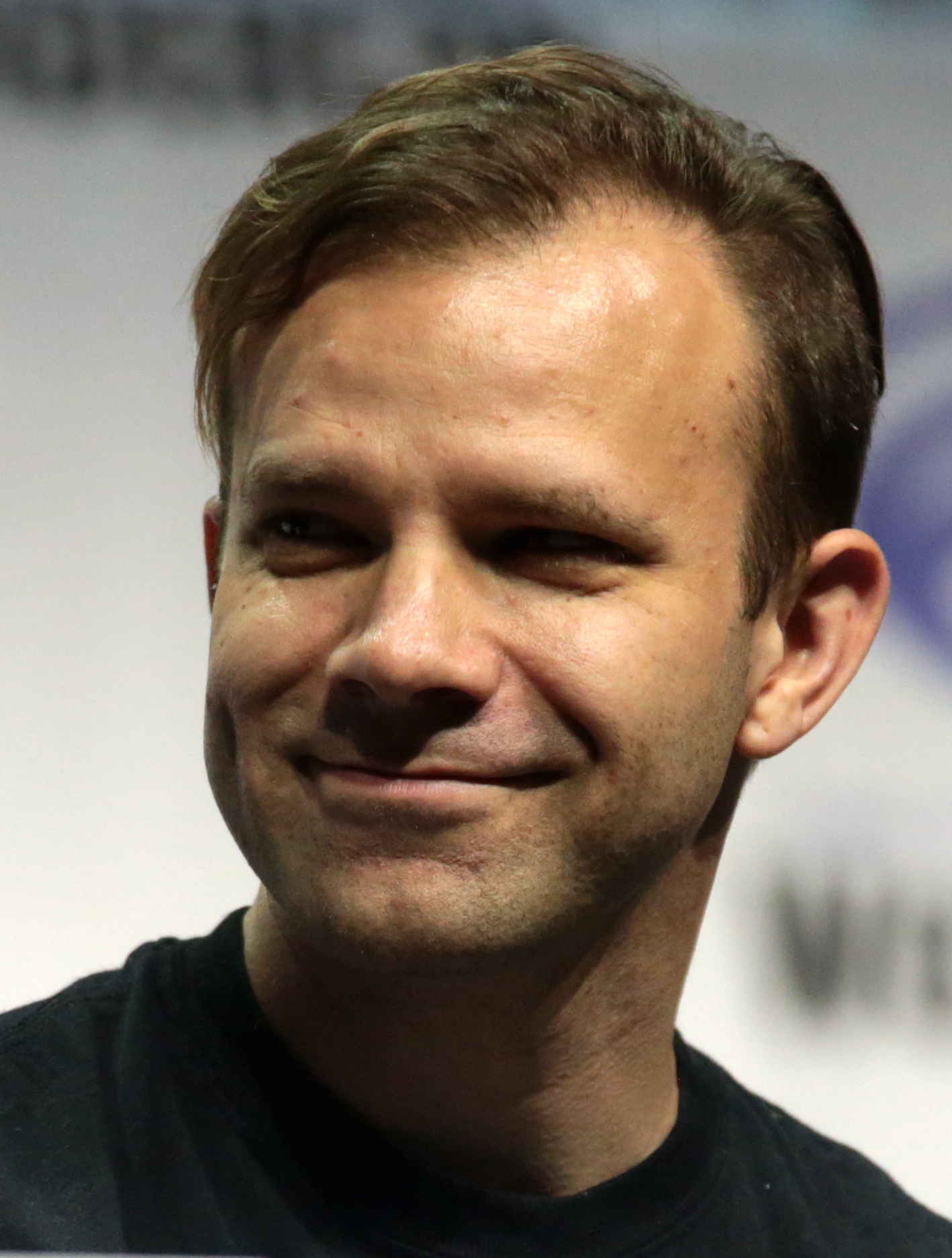
Liam O'Brien

- May 1
  - Darius McCrary, actor
  - James Murray, actor
- May 2 – Jeff Gutt, singer/songwriter and frontman for Stone Temple Pilots (2017-present)
- May 3
  - D. J. Brigman, golfer
  - Guillermo E. Brown, multi-disciplinary performer
  - Jeff Halpern, ice hockey player
  - Tony Wied, businessman and politician
- May 4
  - Michael Aronov, actor
  - Jason Michaels, baseball player
- May 5 – Sage Stallone, actor, film director, producer, and distributor (d. 2012)
- May 6
  - Alicka Ampry-Samuel, politician
  - Marshall Burt, railroader and politician
- May 7
  - Calvin Booth, basketball player
  - Nick Butcher, field hockey player
  - Michael P. Murphy, U.S. Navy SEAL, First recipient of the Medal of Honor in the Afghanistan War (d. 2005)
- May 8
  - Gonçalo Abecasis, Portuguese-born biomedical researcher
  - Luke Burbank, radio host and podcaster
  - Martha Wainwright, Canadian-born folk-pop singer
- May 9 – Vanessa Alfano, journalist
- May 10 – Rhona Bennett, actress, singer, and model
- May 14
  - Cortney Lance Bledsoe, writer, poet, and book reviewer
  - Hunter Burgan, bassist for AFI
- May 15
  - Michael Bishop, football player
  - Torraye Braggs, basketball player
  - Sashi Brown, football executive
  - Ryan Leaf, football player
  - Tyler Walker, baseball player
- May 16 – Pat Bradley, basketball player
- May 17 – Kandi Burruss, producer, television personality, singer/songwriter, and actress
- May 18 – Lisa Byington, announcer, studio host, producer, and reporter
- May 19
  - Carrie Barton, Olympic synchronized swimmer
  - Kevin Garnett, basketball player
- May 20 – Louis Bullock, basketball player
- May 21
  - Rocky Biddle, baseball player
  - Ryan Bittle, actor
  - Deron Miller, singer/songwriter, guitarist, and frontman for CKY (1998-2012)
- May 22 – Chris Brazzell, football player
- May 24 – Chris Bergson, guitarist and singer/songwriter
- May 25
  - J. Michael Tatum, voice actor
  - Erinn Hayes, actress
  - Ethan Suplee, actor
  - Vincent Piazza, actor
- May 28 – Liam O'Brien, actor
- May 29
  - Maceo Baston, basketball player
  - Dawn Buth, tennis player
- May 30 – Brad Finstad, politician
- May 31 – Spencer Albee, singer/songwriter

=== June ===
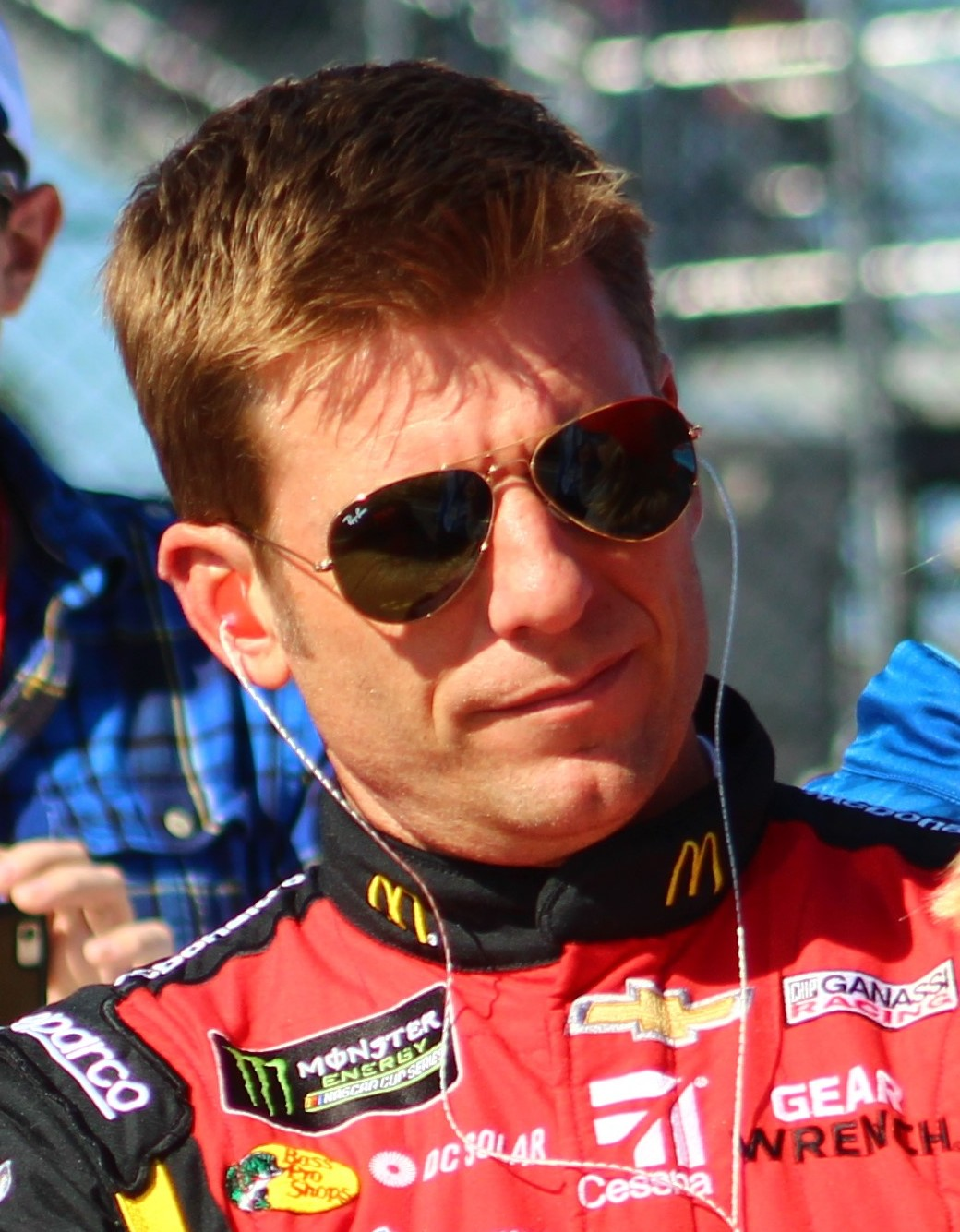
Jamie McMurray

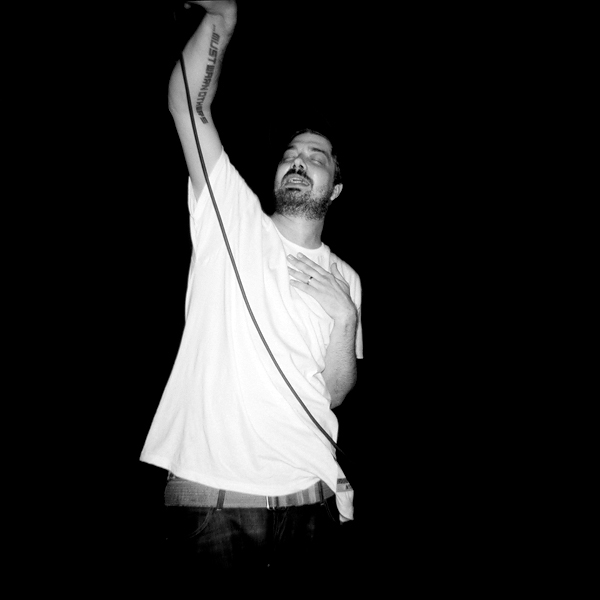
Aesop Rock

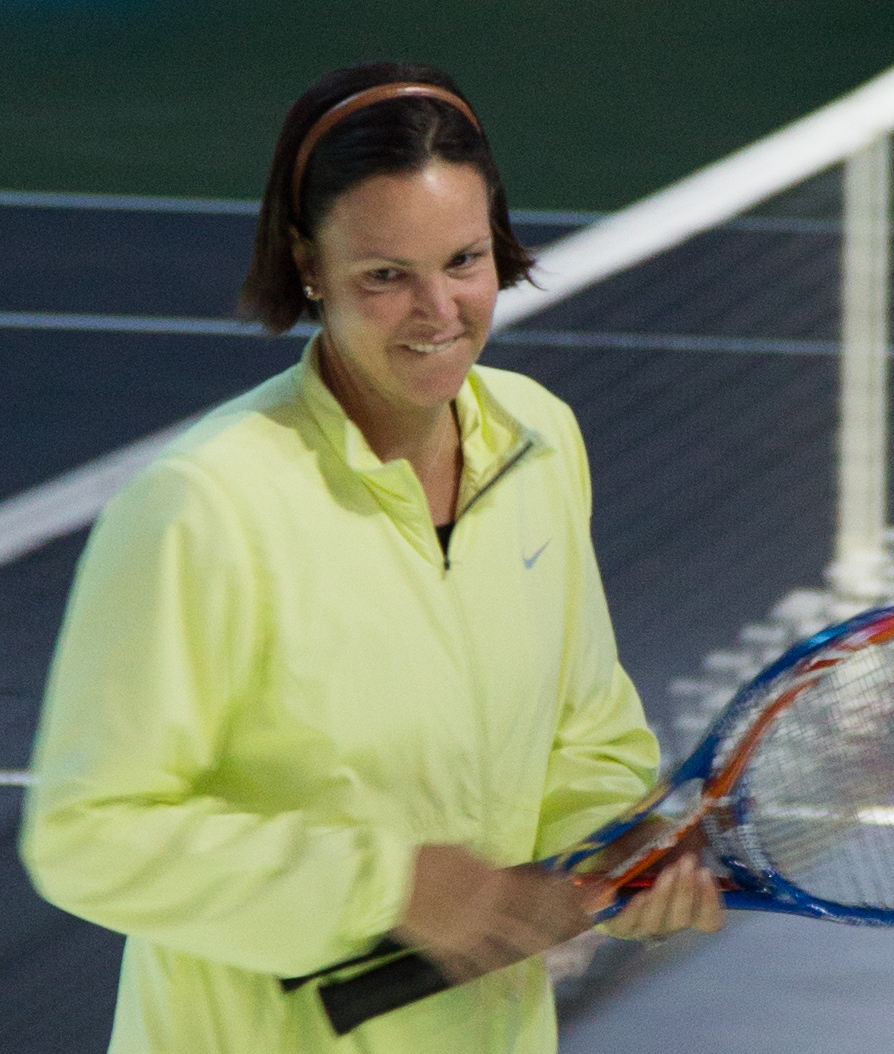
Lindsay Davenport

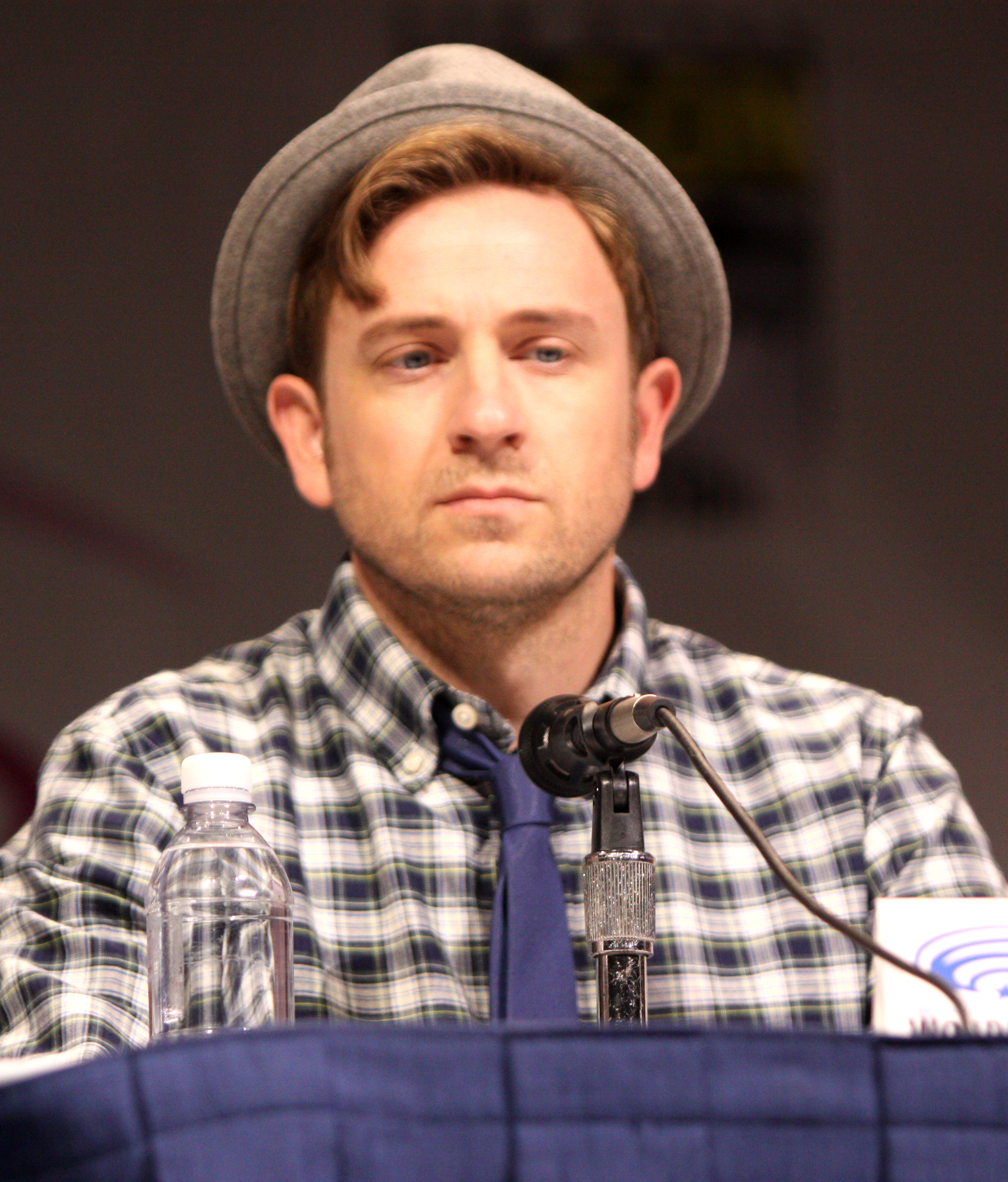
Tom Lenk

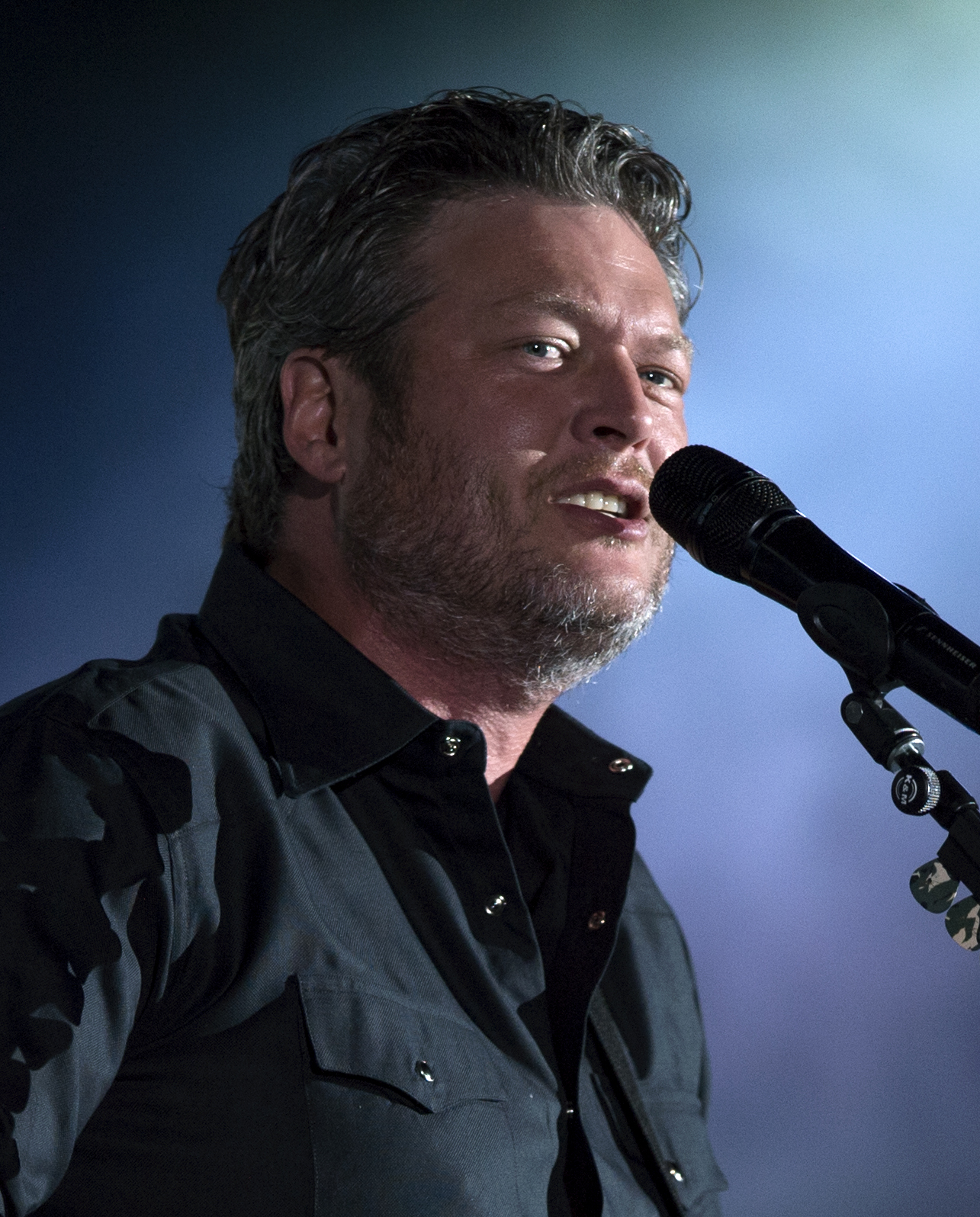
Blake Shelton

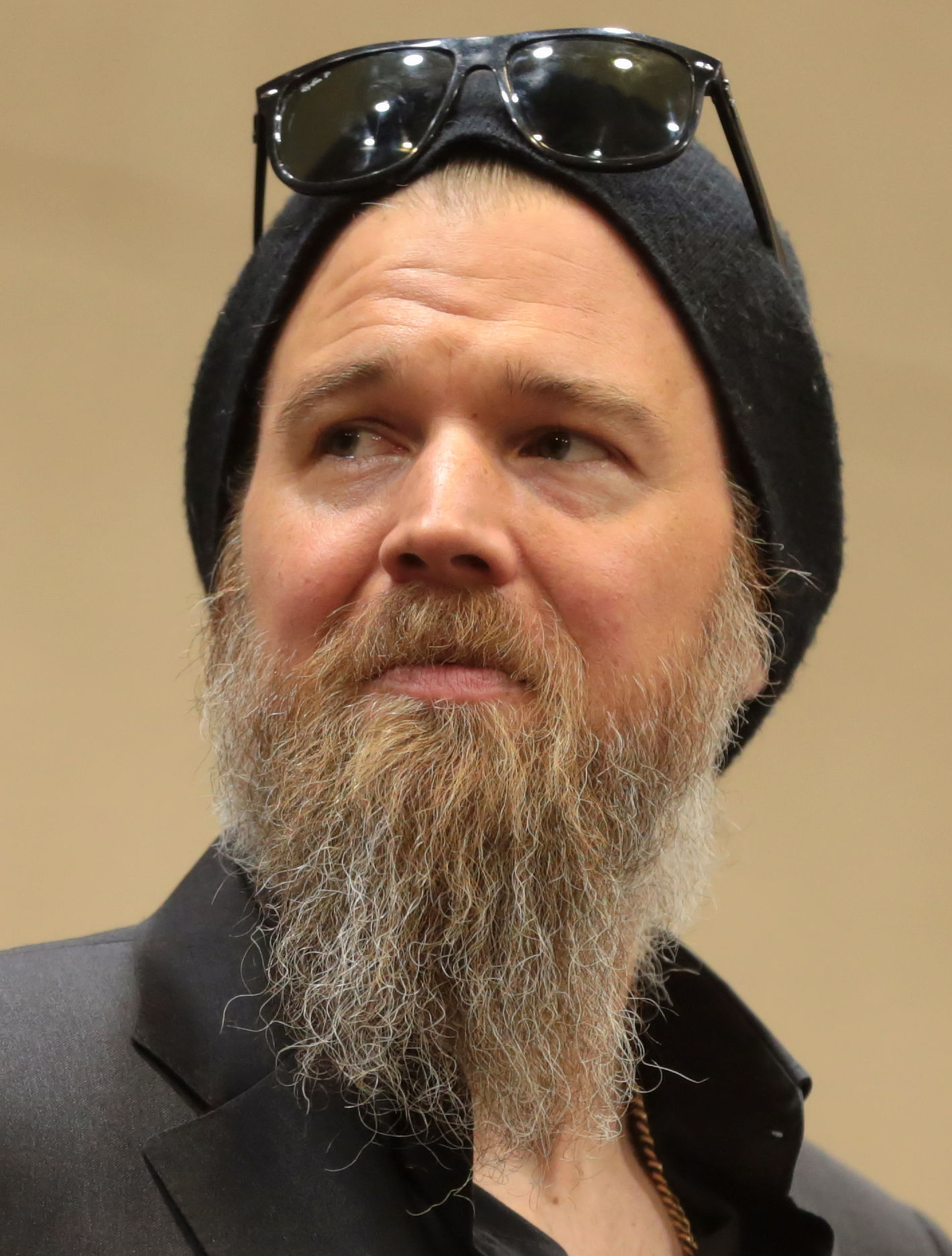
Ryan Hurst

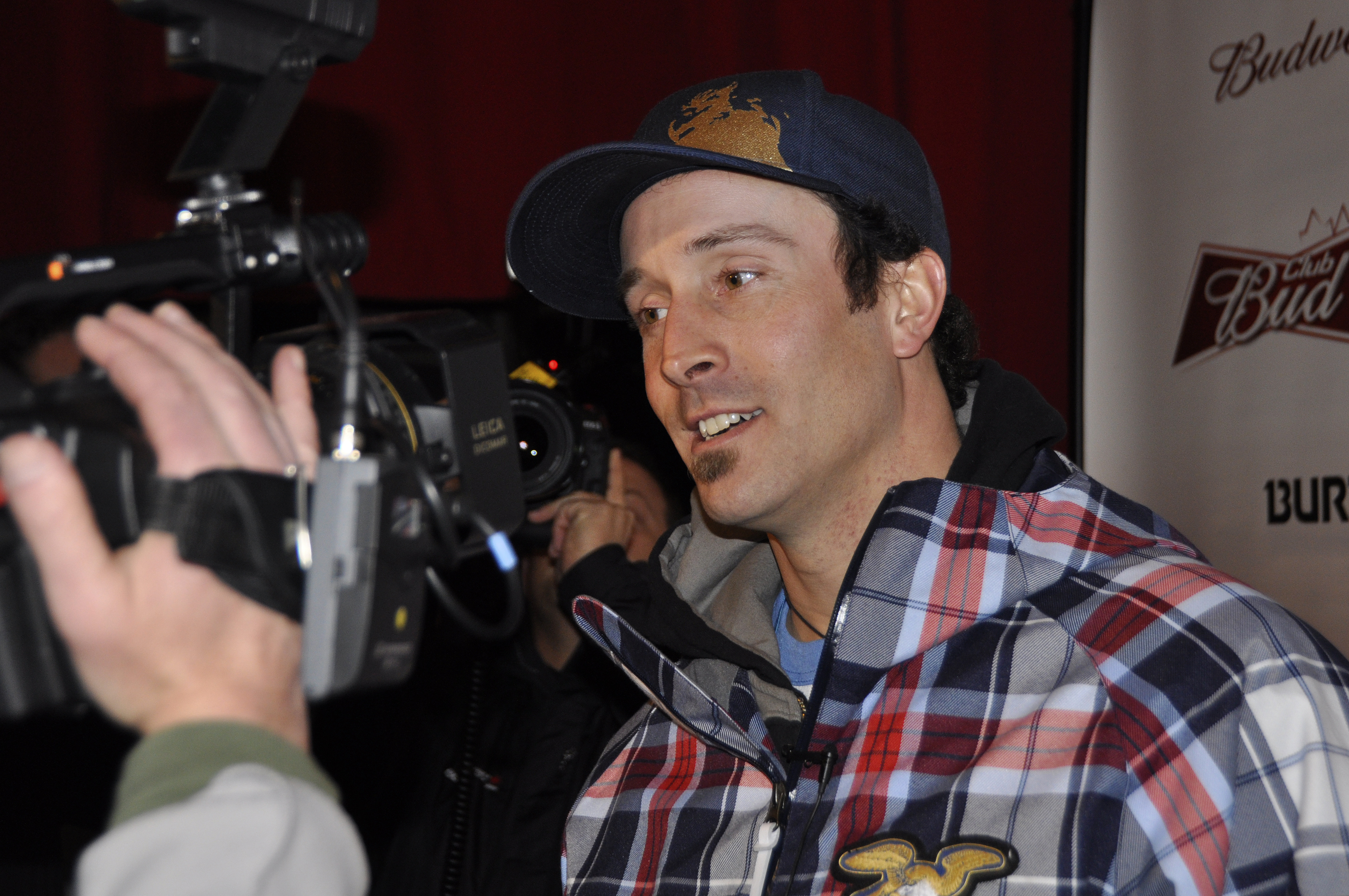
Seth Wescott

- June 1
  - Angela Perez Baraquio, Miss America 2001
  - Peter Cornell, basketball player
  - Björn Leví Gunnarsson, Icelandic politician
- June 2
  - Syl Apps III, ice hockey player
  - Andre Barnett, entrepreneur, politician, and model
  - Earl Boykins, basketball player
- June 3 – Jamie McMurray, race car driver
- June 5
  - Aesop Rock, hip-hop artist
  - Torry Holt, football player and sportscaster
  - Joe Gatto, comedian
- June 6
  - Paul Broome, soccer player
  - Jonathan Nolan, British-born screenwriter and producer
- June 7
  - Sean Aaberg, comic artist
  - Samantha Baggett, soccer player and coach
  - Necro, rapper
- June 8
  - Eion Bailey, actor
  - Lindsay Davenport, tennis player
- June 9
  - Kendra Horn, politician
  - Leslie Rutledge, politician, 21st Lieutenant Governor of Arkansas
- June 10 – Charles White, chef
- June 12 – Brian Anderson, skateboarder
- June 14
  - Anthony Boone, basketball player
  - Carmen Bricillo, football coach
  - Ryan Brownlee, baseball player and coach
- June 16 – Tom Lenk, actor
- June 18
  - Busbee, songwriter, record producer, publisher, record label executive, and multi-instrumentalist (d. 2019)
  - Alana De La Garza, actress
  - Christina Pazsitzky, Canadian-born comedian, podcaster, writer, host, and television personality
  - Blake Shelton, country singer
- June 19
  - Darnell Autry, football player
  - Scott Avett, singer/songwriter, banjo player, guitarist and pianist
  - Ryan Hurst, actor
- June 20
  - Rob Mackowiak, baseball player and coach
  - Roy Nelson, mixed martial artist
- June 21
  - Roxanne Avent, producer
  - Mark Blasdel, politician
  - Antonio Cochran, football player
- June 22 – Mike O'Brien, actor, writer, and comedian
- June 23
  - Wade Barrett, soccer player
  - Joe Becker, musician
  - Aaron Ruell, director, photographer, and actor
  - Brandon Stokley, football player
- June 24
  - Rasheed Brokenborough, basketball player
  - Jay Kristopher Huddy, artist, filmmaker and video game designer
- June 25
  - Matthew Axelson, U.S. Navy SEAL and Navy Cross recipient (d. 2005)
  - Neil Walker, Olympic swimmer
- June 26 – Dave Rubin, political commentator
- June 27
  - Leigh Nash, Christian singer/songwriter and vocalist for Sixpence None the Richer
  - Joseph Sikora, actor
- June 28
  - Tony Ray Amati, convicted serial killer
  - Jason J. Lewis, voice actor
  - Seth Wescott, Olympic snowboarder
- June 29
  - Shaun Butler, BMX rider
  - Omar Doom, actor, musician, and artist
- June 30
  - Angie Akers, volleyball player
  - Jason Bostic, football player

=== July ===
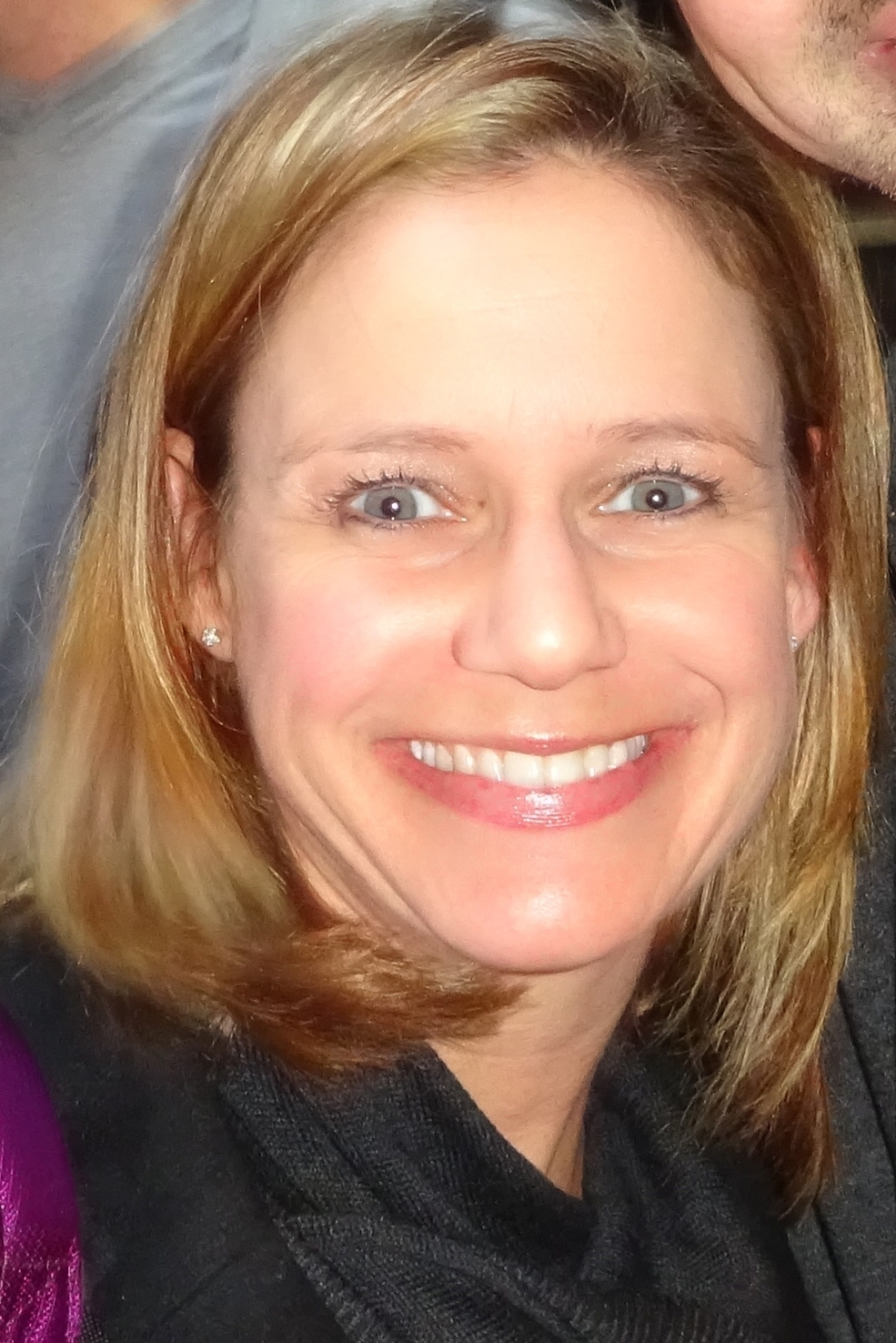
Andrea Barber

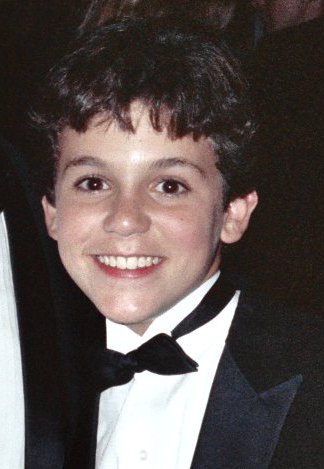
Fred Savage

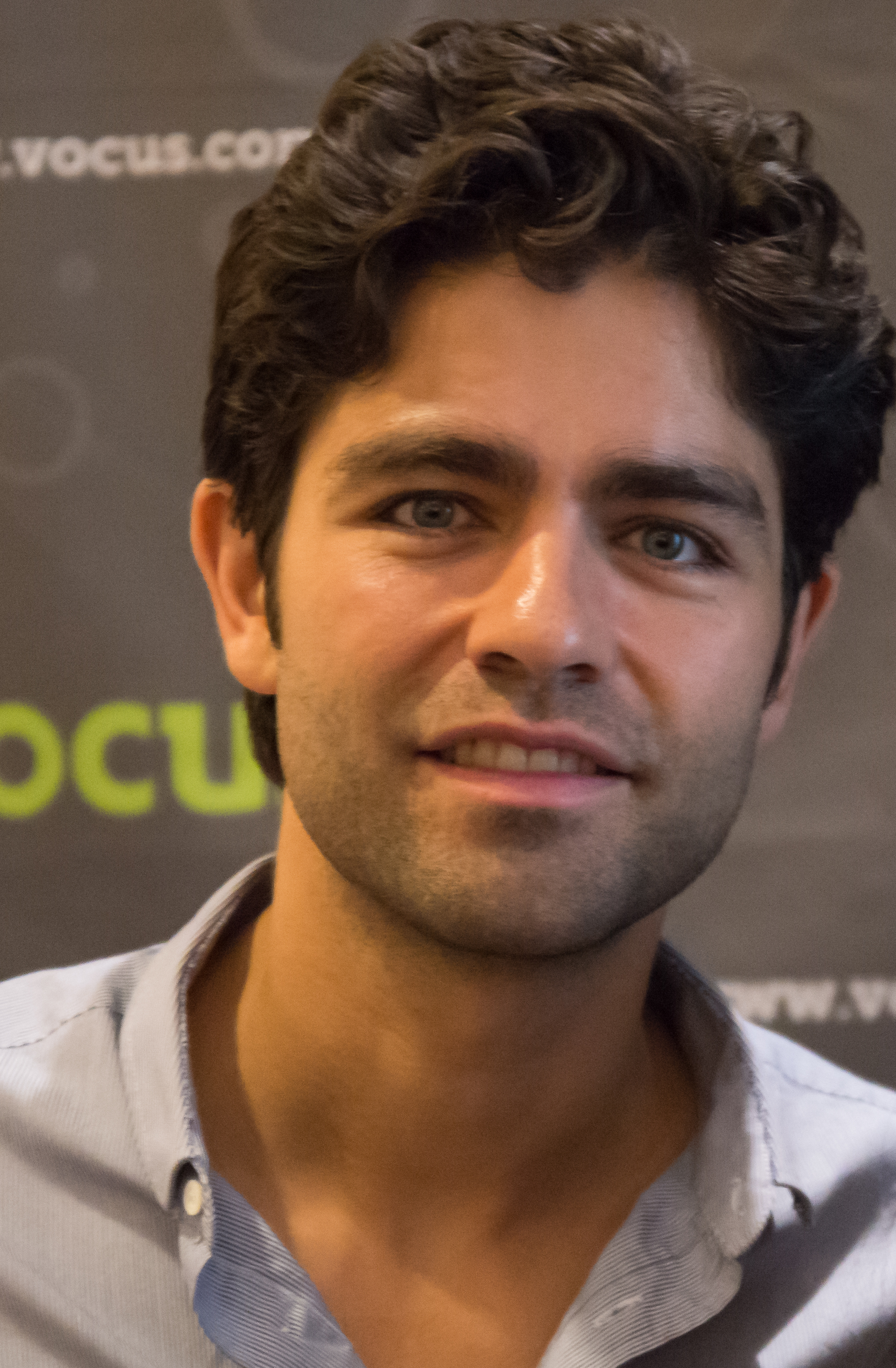
Adrian Grenier

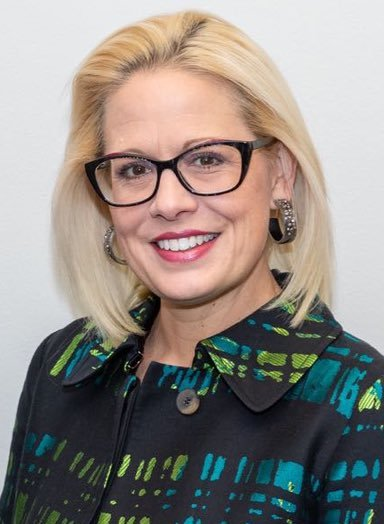
Kyrsten Sinema

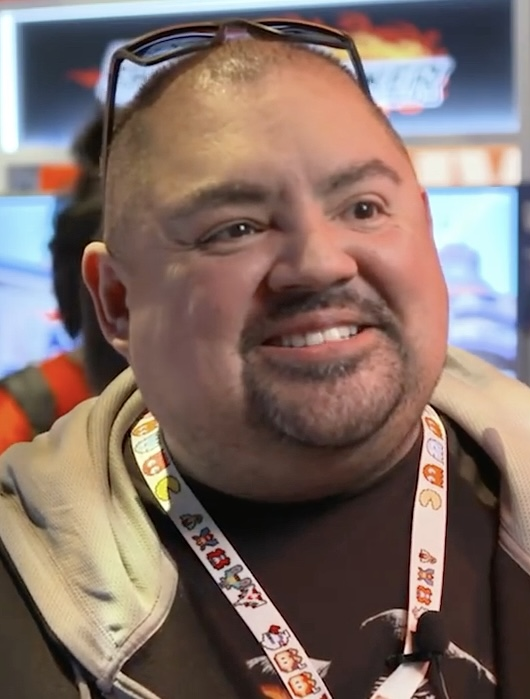
Gabriel Iglesias

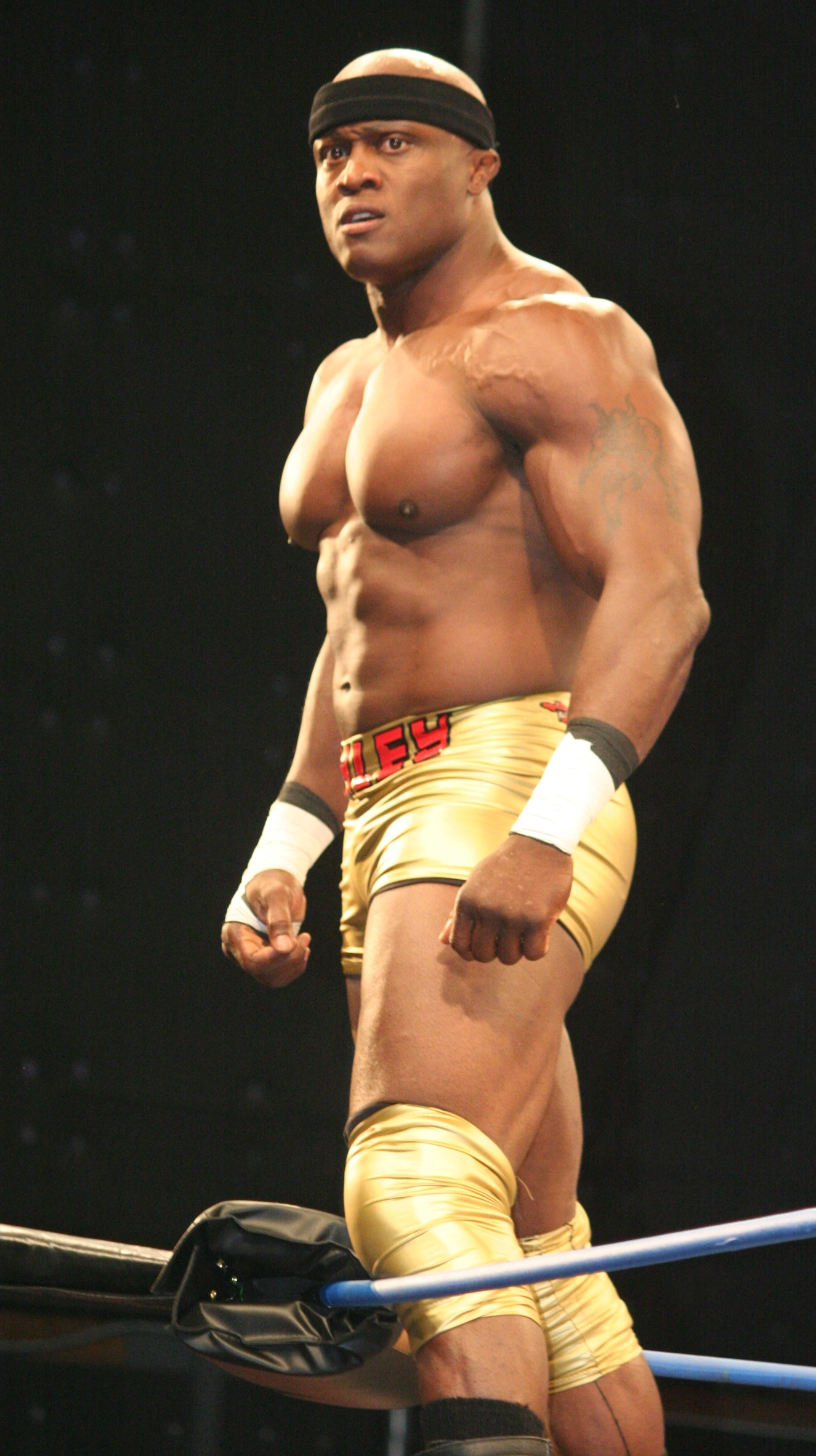
Bobby Lashley

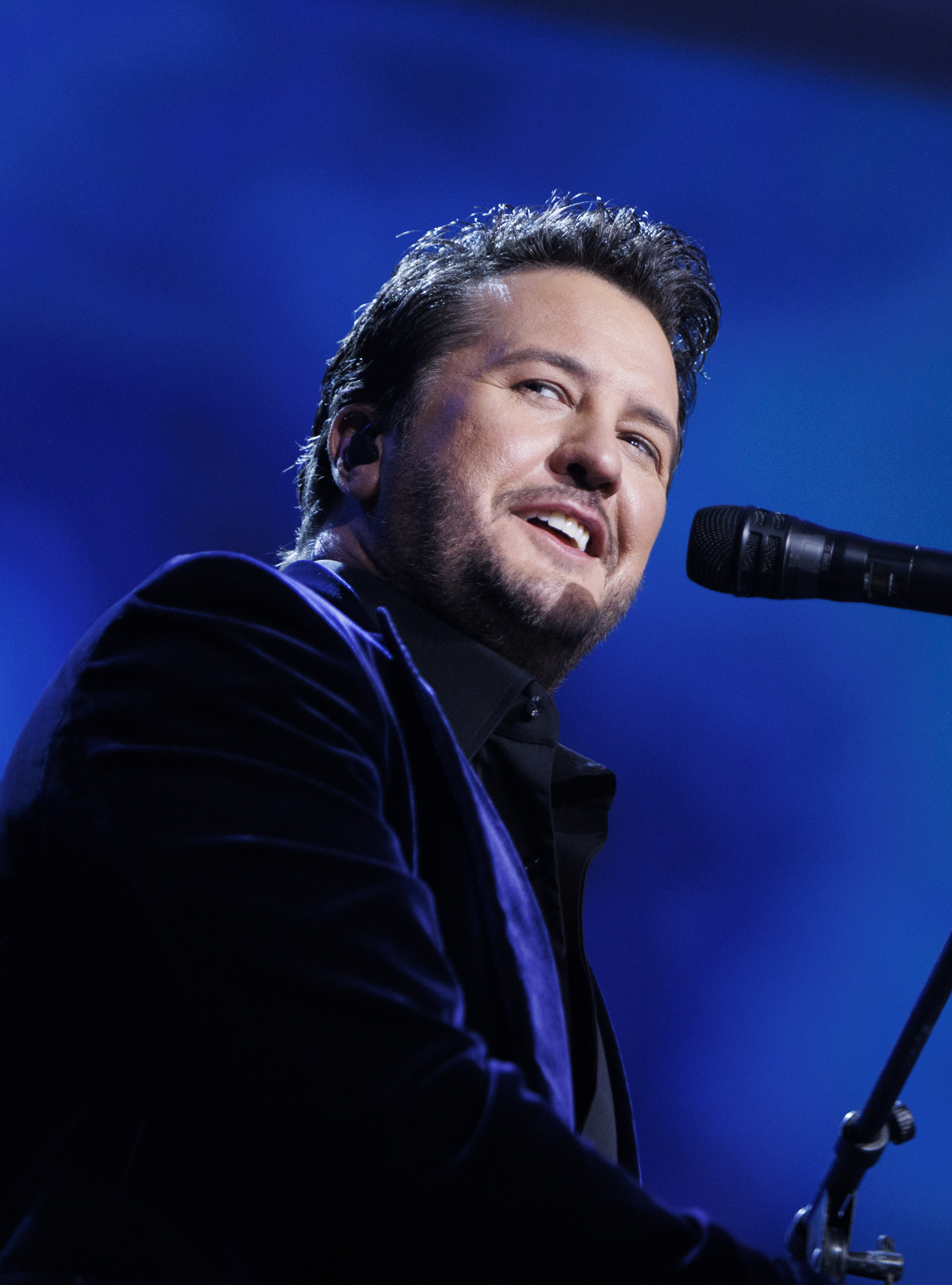
Luke Bryan

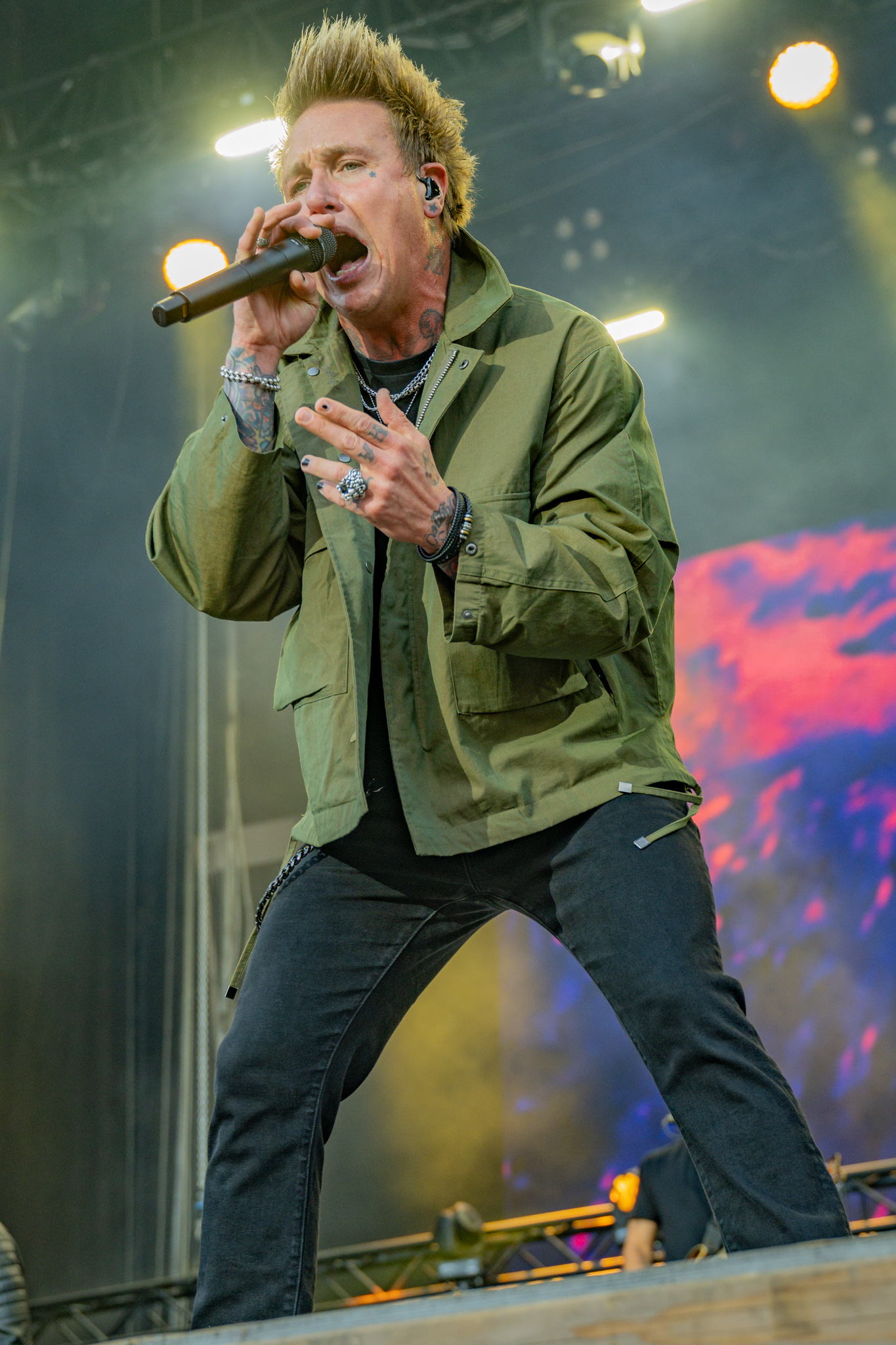
Jacoby Shaddix

- July 1
  - Thomas Sadoski, actor
  - Haaz Sleiman, Lebanese-born actor
  - Kristen Welker, journalist
- July 2
  - Erin Burnett, news anchor
  - Tommy Pistol, actor and director
- July 3 – Andrea Barber, actress
- July 4
  - Layne Beaubien, Olympic water polo player
  - Jo Chen, Taiwanese-born comic book artist and writer
  - Michael W. Ford, occultist, writer, and musician
- July 5
  - Bizarre, rapper
  - Jamie Elman, Canadian-born actor
  - Rufus Johnson, rapper
- July 7
  - Cyndi Buchheit-Courtway, politician
  - Hamish Linklater, actor and playwright
- July 8 – Iyari Limon, Mexican-born actress
- July 9
  - Krondon, rapper and actor
  - Fred Savage, actor and director
- July 10
  - Elijah Blue Allman, singer, guitarist, and frontman for Deadsy
  - JoJuan Armour, football player
  - Bisa Grant, athlete
  - Adrian Grenier, actor, musician, and director
  - Elissa Slotkin, politician
- July 12
  - Kris Bergstrom, taiko player
  - Gwenda Bond, author
  - Kyrsten Sinema, politician
  - Tracie Spencer, R&B singer
- July 15
  - Gabriel Iglesias, comedian, actor and producer
  - Jim Jones, rapper, member of hip hop group The Diplomats
- July 16
  - Bobby Lashley, wrestler
  - Zak Smith, artist and adult film performer
- July 17
  - Luke Bryan, country singer/songwriter
  - Colby Buzzell, author, blogger, and U.S. Army soldier
  - Dagmara Domińczyk, Polish-born actress and author
  - Miraj Grbić, Bosnian-born actor
  - Eric Winter, actor and fashion model
- July 18 – Sebastian Blanck, musician and figurative painter
- July 19 – Vinessa Shaw, actress and model
- July 21 – Cori Bush, politician and Black Lives Matter activist
- July 22 – Nino Alejandro, Philippine-born singer/songwriter
- July 23
  - Charla Baklayan Faddoul, Syrian-born television personality
  - Tony Bevilacqua, guitarist for The Distillers
  - Matt Birk, football player
  - Anthony Blevins, football player
  - Stephanie Grisham, White House Press Secretary (2019-2020)
- July 24
  - Chris Ahrens, Olympic rower
  - Rafer Alston, basketball player
  - Nate Bump, baseball player
  - Rashida Tlaib, politician
- July 26 – Martha Roby, politician
- July 27
  - Ryan Michelle Bathe, actress
  - Brandon Beane, football executive
- July 28 – Jacoby Shaddix, singer, television personality, and frontman for Papa Roach
- July 29
  - Abiola Abrams, author, podcaster, motivational speaker, and spiritual life coach
  - Peter Alexander, journalist
- July 30 – Nigel Burton, football player, coach, and commentator
- July 31
  - John Joseph Adams, science fiction and fantasy editor, critic, and publisher
  - Marty Booker, football player
  - Rod Monroe, football player (d. 2017)

=== August ===
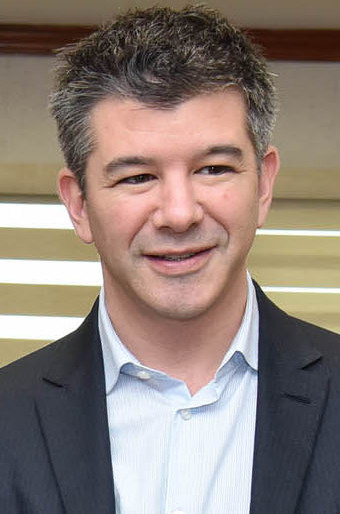
Travis Kalanick

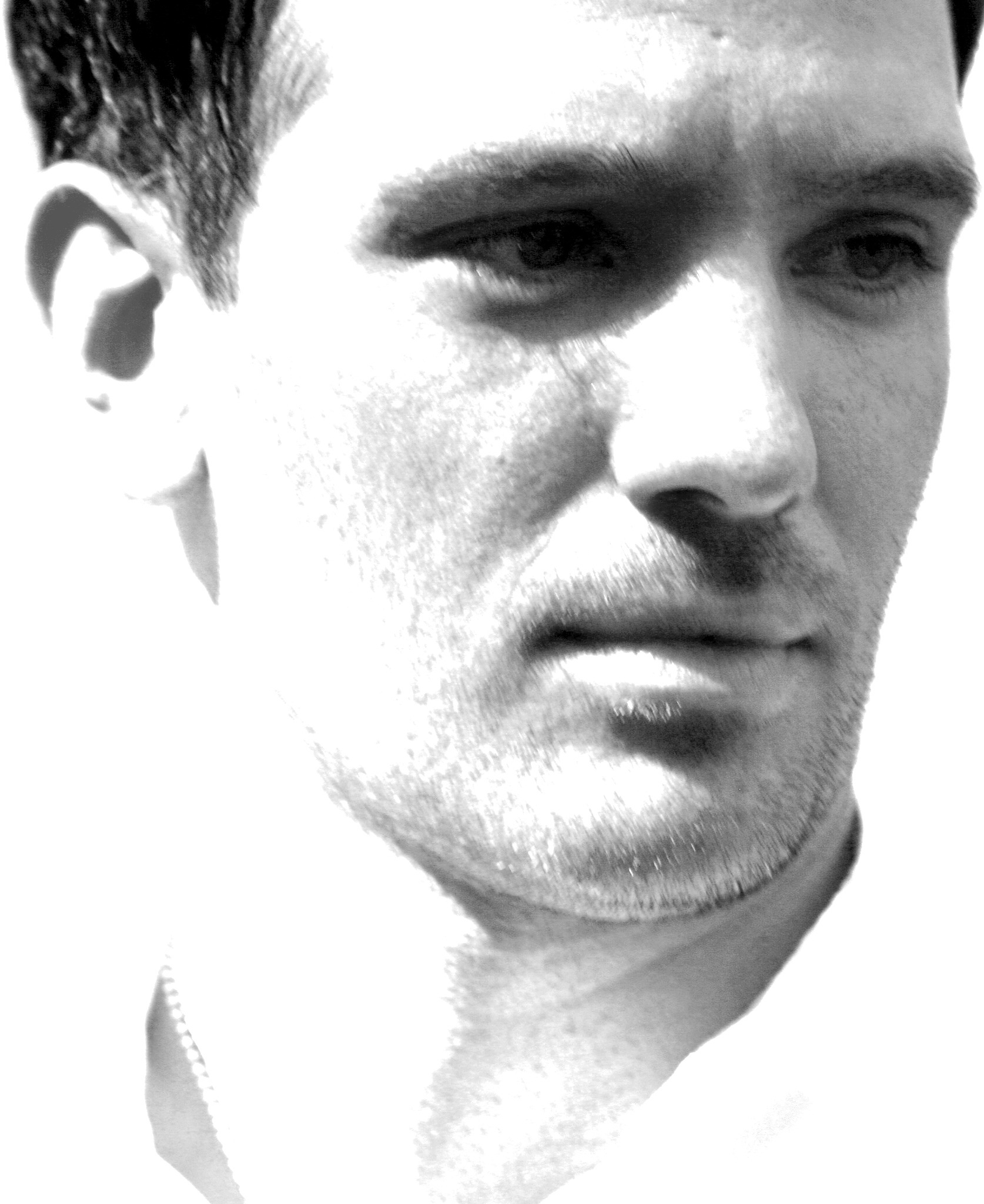
JC Chasez

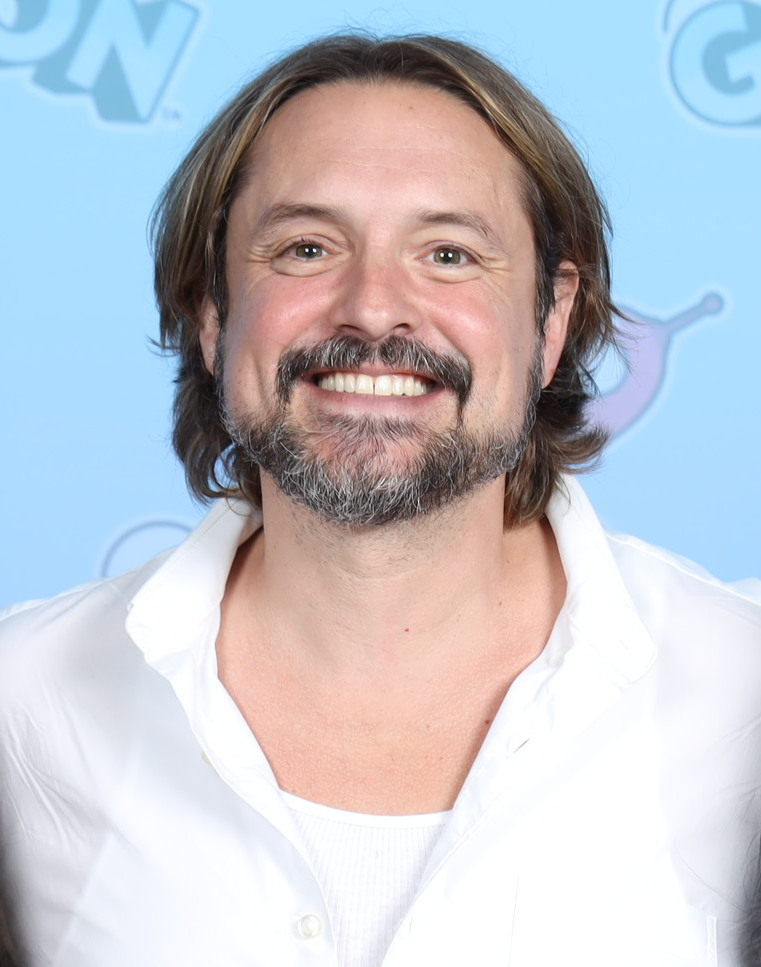
Will Friedle

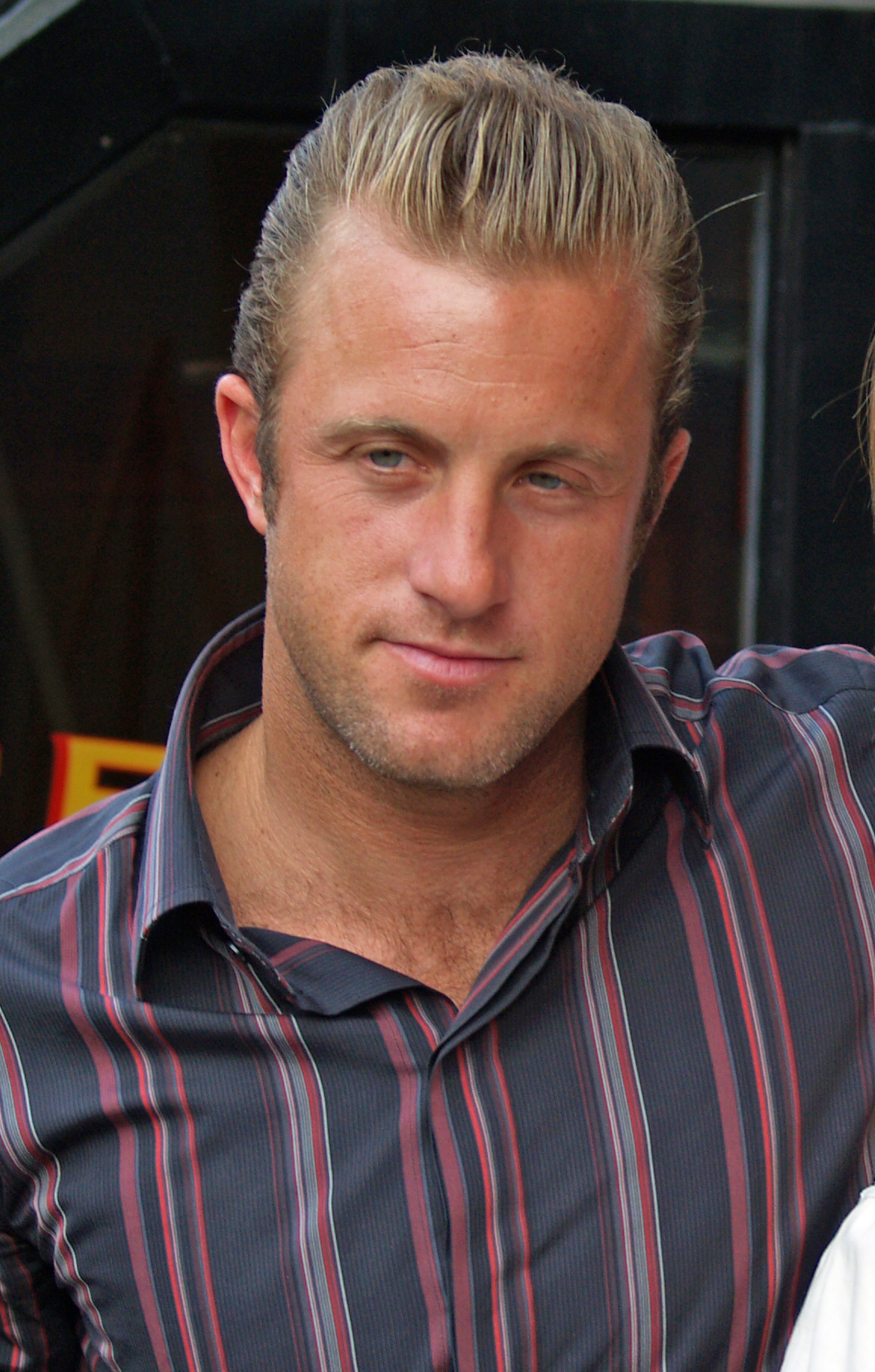
Scott Caan

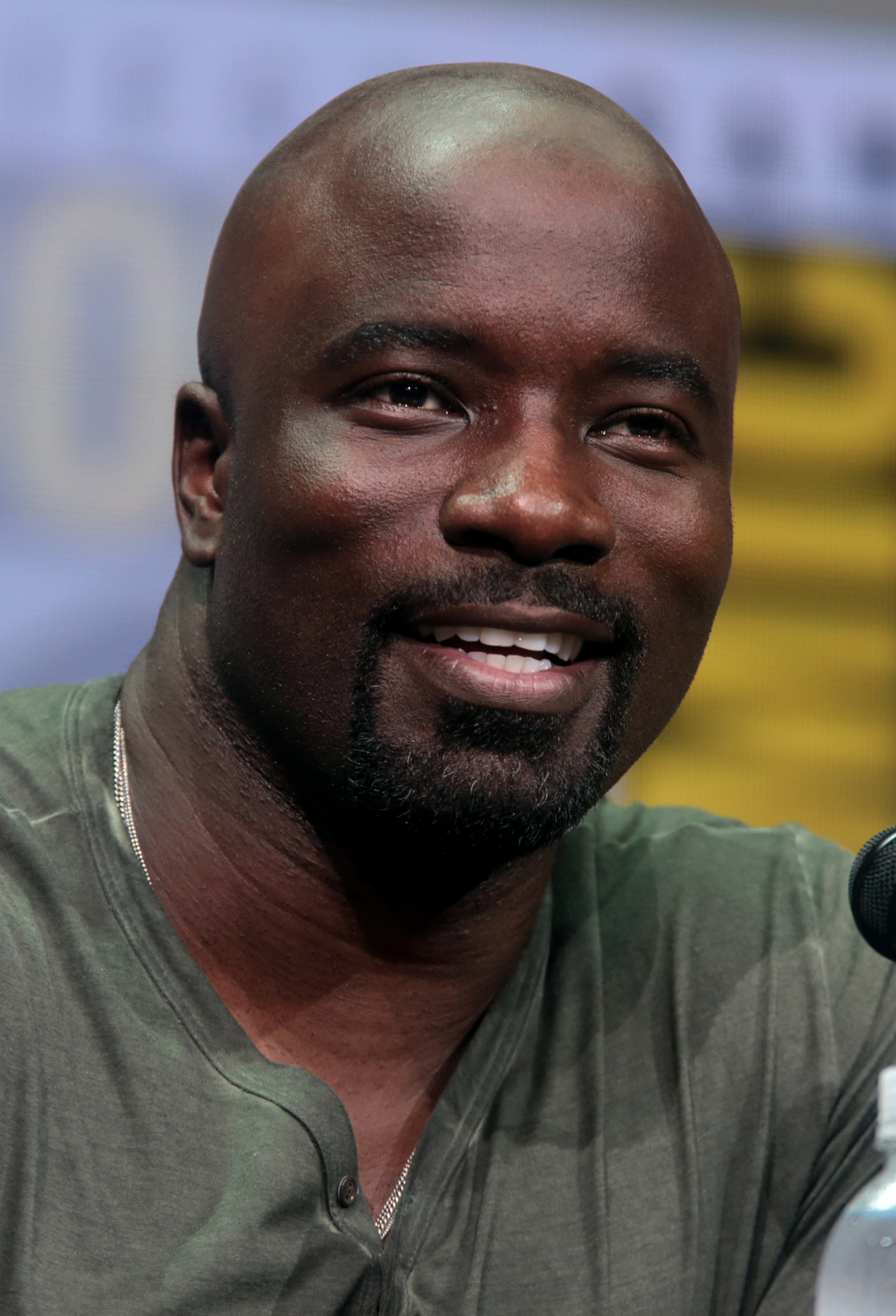
Mike Colter

- August 1
  - Robin Belcher, politician
  - Don Hertzfeldt, animator
- August 3
  - Scott Barry, MLB umpire
  - Troy Glaus, baseball player
- August 4 – Paul Goldstein, tennis player
- August 5 – Napoleon Beazley, convicted murderer (d. 2002)
- August 6
  - Roderick Blakney, American-born Bulgarian basketball player
  - Soleil Moon Frye, actress and producer
  - Travis Kalanick, businessman and computer programmer; co-founder of Uber
- August 7
  - Nargiz Birk-Petersen, Azerbaijani-born lawyer, presenter, and model
  - Regina T. Boyce, politician
- August 8
  - JC Chasez, singer and member of 'N Sync
  - Drew Lachey, singer and member of 98 Degrees
  - Nigél Thatch, actor
- August 9 – Jessica Capshaw, actress
- August 10 – Zach Azzanni, football coach
- August 11
  - Jermaine Alfred, football player
  - Brendan Bayliss, singer, guitarist, and frontman for Umphrey's McGee
  - Will Friedle, actor, voice actor, writer, and comedian
- August 12
  - Antoine Walker, basketball player
  - Wednesday 13, rock musician
- August 14 – Alex Albrecht, television personality
- August 16 – Terence Crutcher, African-American killed by police (d. 2016)
- August 17
  - Matt Anderson, baseball player
  - Scott Halberstadt, actor
- August 18
  - Teri Anulewicz, politician
  - Brian Bowles, baseball player
  - Jon Busch, soccer player and coach
  - Bryan Volpenhein, Olympic rower
- August 19 – Michael M. Wartella, underground cartoonist
- August 21
  - Sam Beall, chef and restaurateur (d. 2016)
  - Charles Berkeley, Olympic bobsledder
  - Alex Brooks, ice hockey player
  - Omen, music producer (d. 2025)
- August 23
  - Michael Bhatia, researcher on conflict resolution in war-torn countries (d. 2008)
  - Scott Caan, actor
- August 25
  - Jensen Atwood, actor
  - Damon Jones, basketball player and coach
- August 26 – Mike Colter, actor
- August 27 – Jeremy Bates, football player
- August 30 – Lillo Brancato Jr., actor
- August 31
  - Shar Jackson, actress and singer
  - Marlin Stutzman, politician

=== September ===
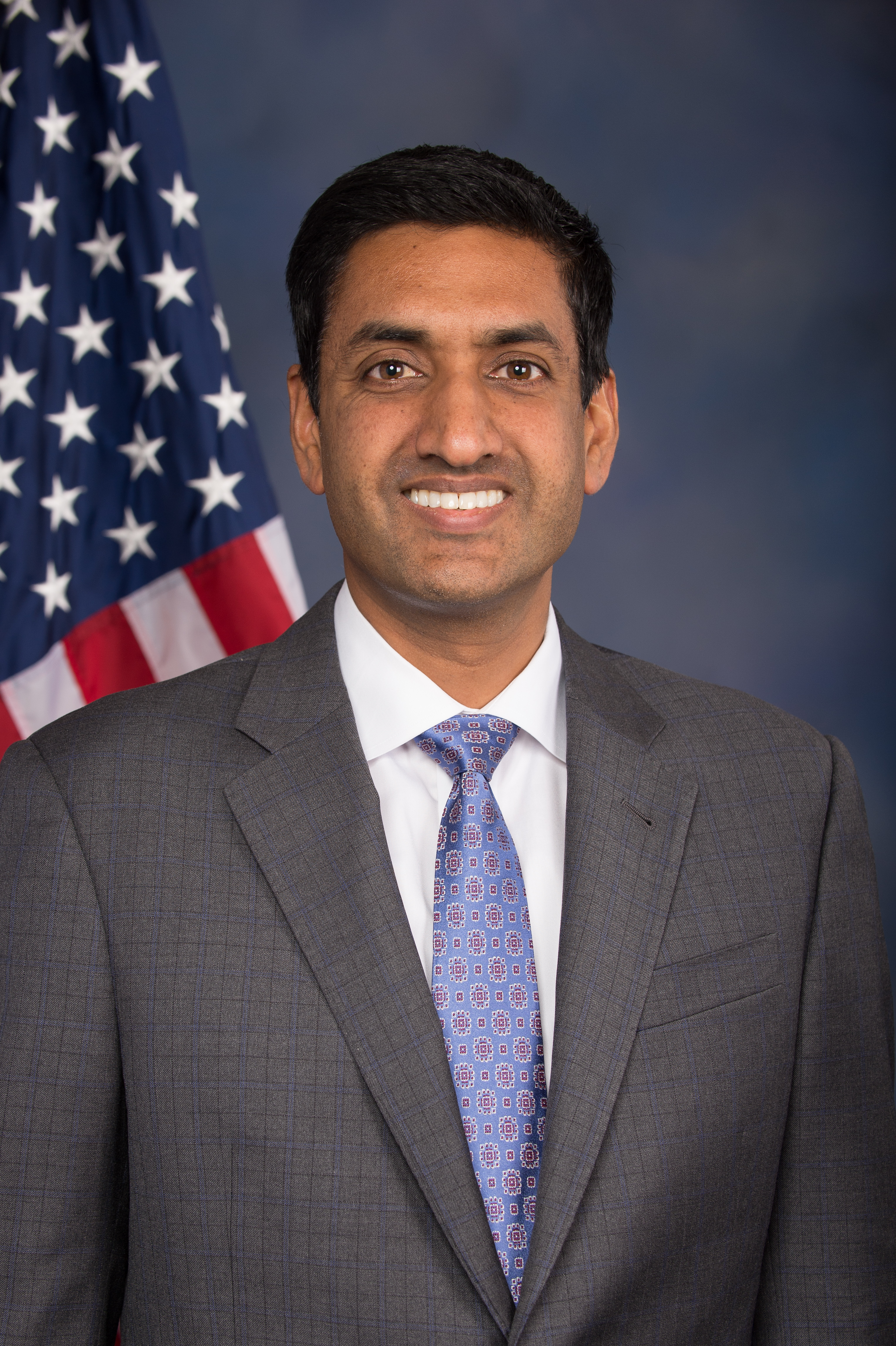
Ro Khanna

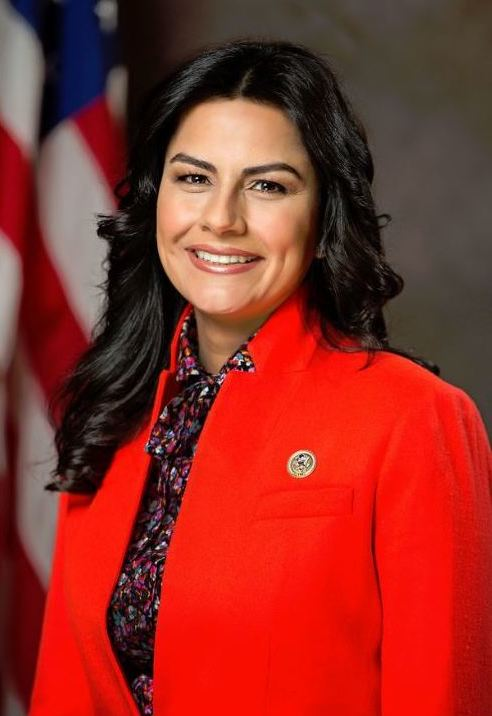
Nanette Barragán

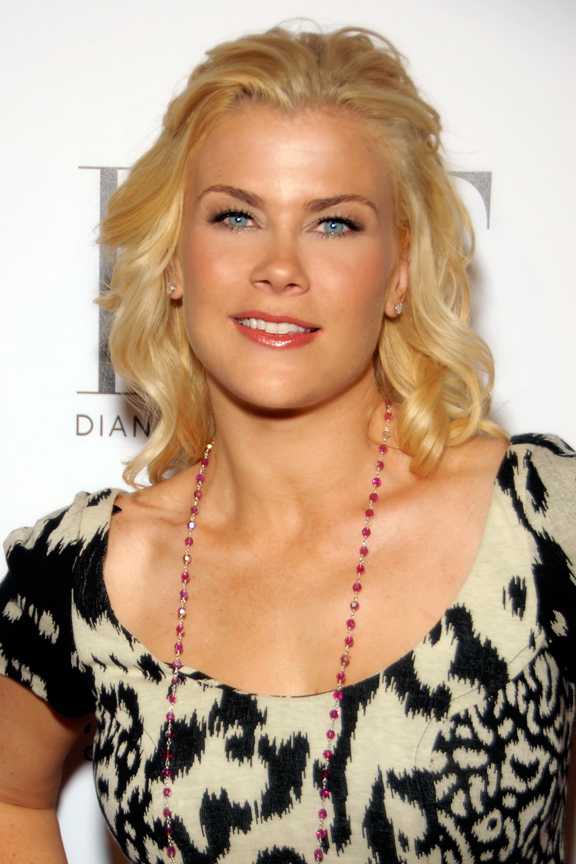
Alison Sweeney

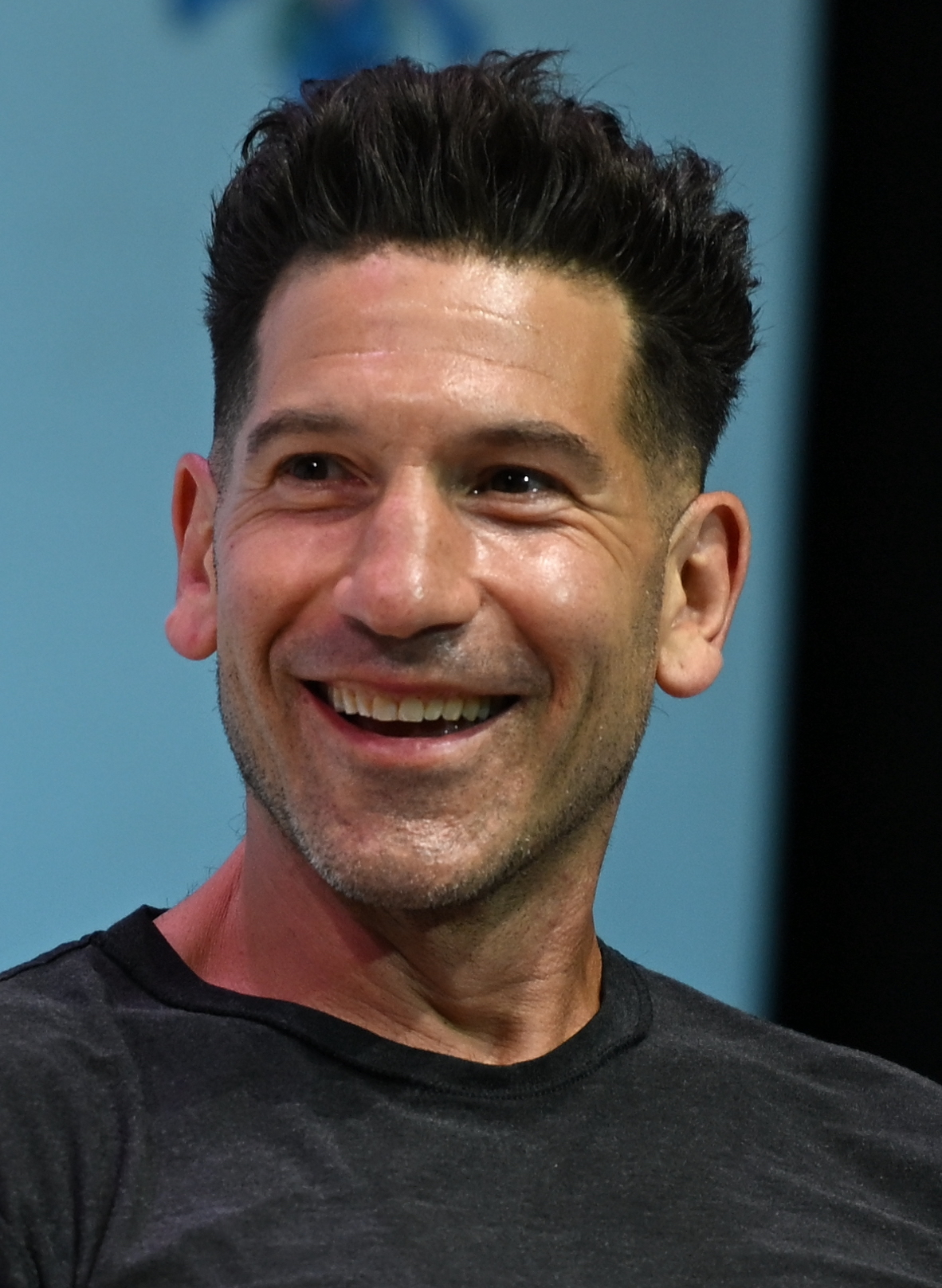
Jon Bernthal

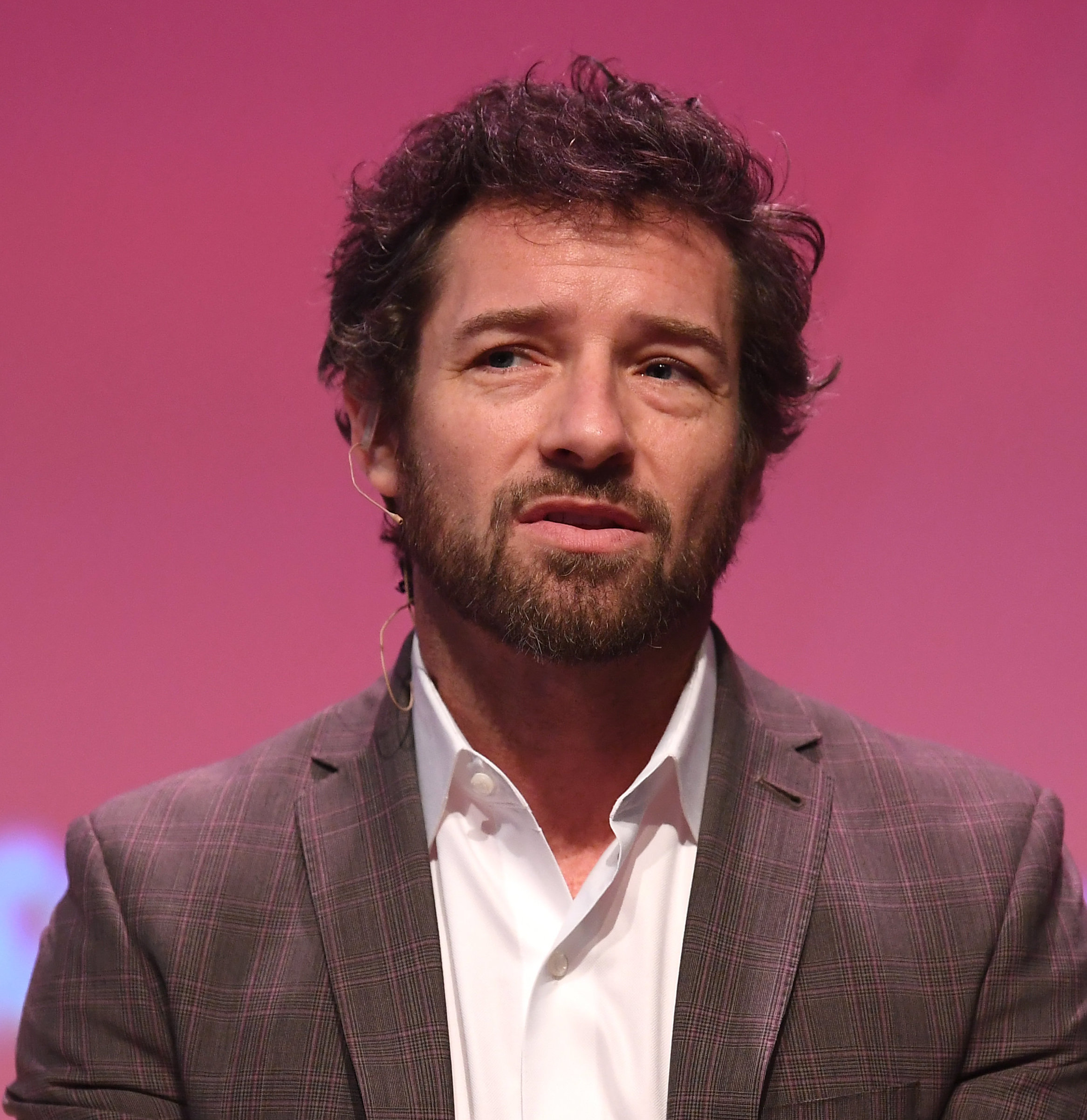
Ian Bohen

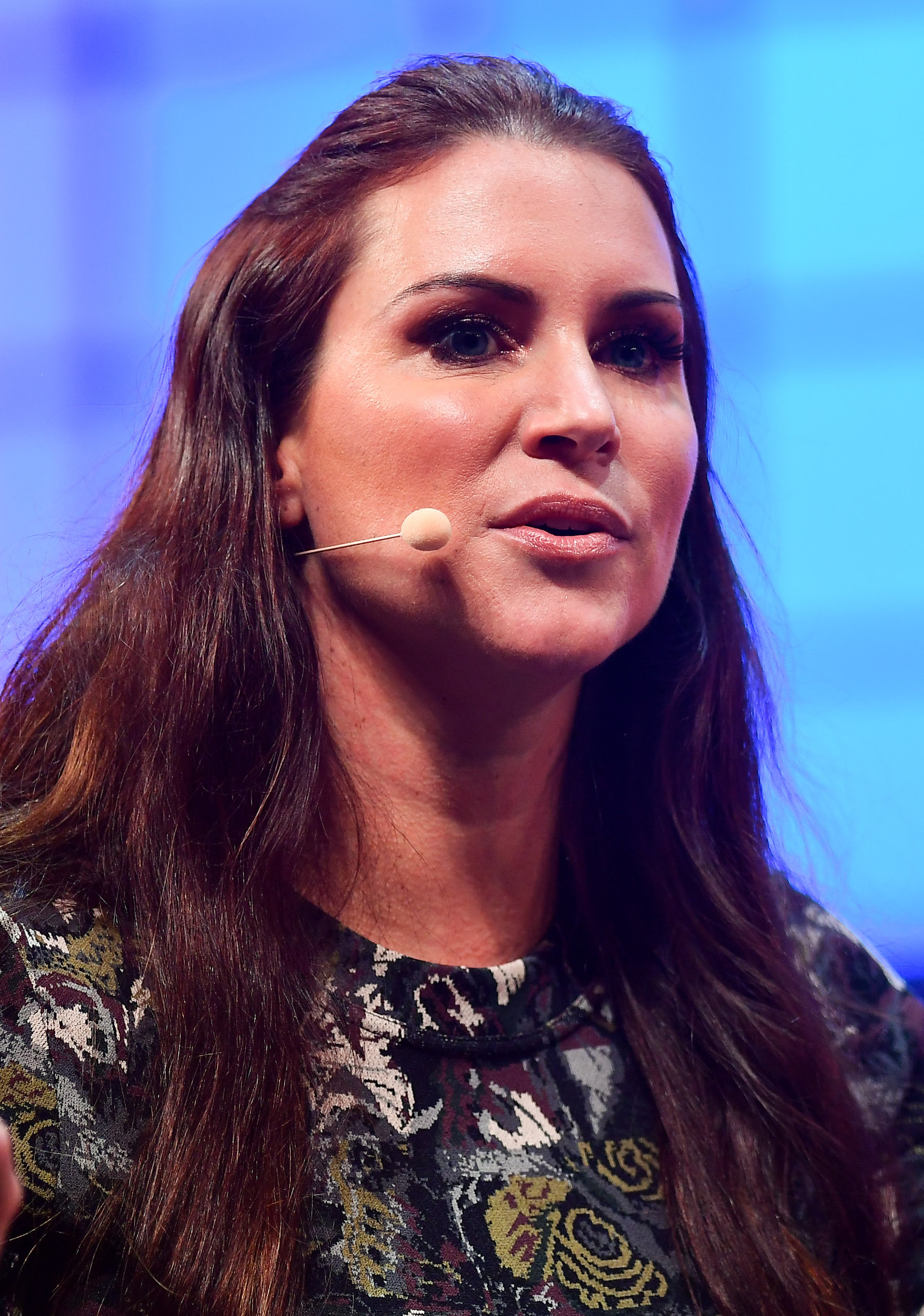
Stephanie McMahon

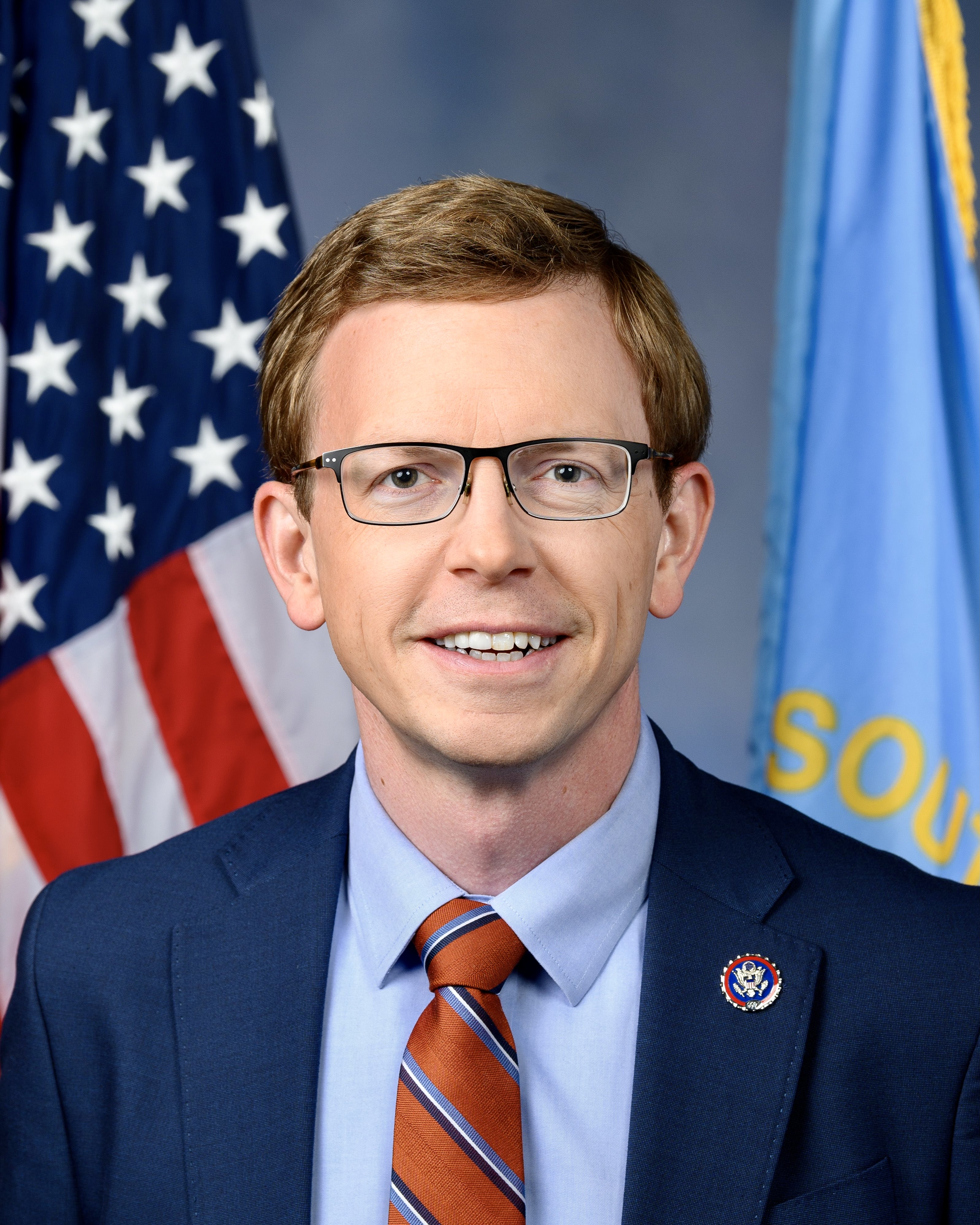
Dusty Johnson

- September 1
  - Babydaddy, bassist, vocalist, and guitarist for Scissor Sisters
  - Cornelius Bonner, football player
  - Larry Brown, football player
- September 3
  - Tony Bryant, football player
  - Ashley Jones, actress
  - Jevon Kearse, football player
  - Raheem Morris, football coach
  - Chamath Palihapitiya, Sri Lankan-born Canadian-American venture capitalist, engineer, SPAC sponsor, and founder and CEO of Social Capital
- September 4 – Brian Myrow, baseball player
- September 5 – Chris Broach, guitarists/vocalists for Braid
- September 6
  - Mike Amiri, fashion designer
  - Annet Artani, singer/songwriter
  - Brendon Ayanbadejo, football player
  - Mark Wilkerson, musician
- September 7
  - Stevie Case, video game celebrity
  - Ryan Costello, politician
  - Oliver Hudson, actor
- September 9 – Jack Brasington, tennis player
- September 10 – Matt Morgan, wrestler and politician
- September 11
  - Masih Alinejad, Iranian-born journalist and women's rights activist
  - Leilani Bishop, model
- September 12
  - Amanda Adams, author, archaeologist, and fashion model
  - Bizzy Bone, rapper
  - LaVell Boyd, football player
- September 13 – Ro Khanna, politician
- September 14
  - Vlatko Andonovski, Yugoslavian-born soccer player and coach
  - Austin Basis, actor
- September 15
  - Bacari Alexander, basketball player and coach
  - Nanette Barragán, politician
  - Rob Wiethoff, actor
- September 16
  - Erik Aadahl, sound editor
  - Greg Buckner, basketball player
- September 17
  - Samuel Aroutiounian, producer and entrepreneur
  - Nicole Reinhart, cyclist (d. 2000)
- September 18
  - Jeremy Barnes, musician
  - Reggie Berg, ice hockey player
  - Angie Braziel, basketball player
  - Sophina Brown, actress
  - Steve Watkins, politician
- September 19
  - Raja Bell, basketball player
  - Jay Electronica, rapper and producer
  - Alison Sweeney, actress and television host
- September 20
  - Jaymi Bailey, soccer player
  - Jon Bernthal, actor
  - Brandon Burlsworth, football player (d. 1999)
- September 22 – David Berkeley, singer/songwriter
- September 23 – Faune A. Chambers, actress and dancer
- September 24
  - Phil Bartlett, politician
  - Radha Blank, actress, filmmaker, playwright, rapper, and comedian
  - Ian Bohen, actor
  - Ben Broussard, baseball player
  - Erin Houchin, politician
  - Stephanie McMahon-Levesque, wrestling promoter, daughter of Vince McMahon
- September 25
  - Charlotte Ayanna, actress and beauty pageant titleholder
  - Chauncey Billups, basketball player
  - Doug Bohaboy, tennis player
  - Santigold, singer/songwriter
- September 28
  - Bonzi Wells, basketball player and coach
  - Farah Alvin, actress
- September 29 – Dave Aranda, football coach
- September 30 – Dusty Johnson, politician

=== October ===
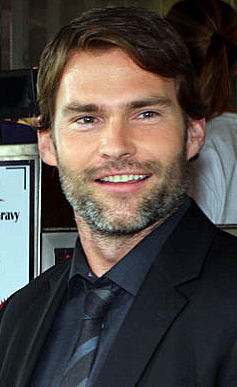
Seann William Scott

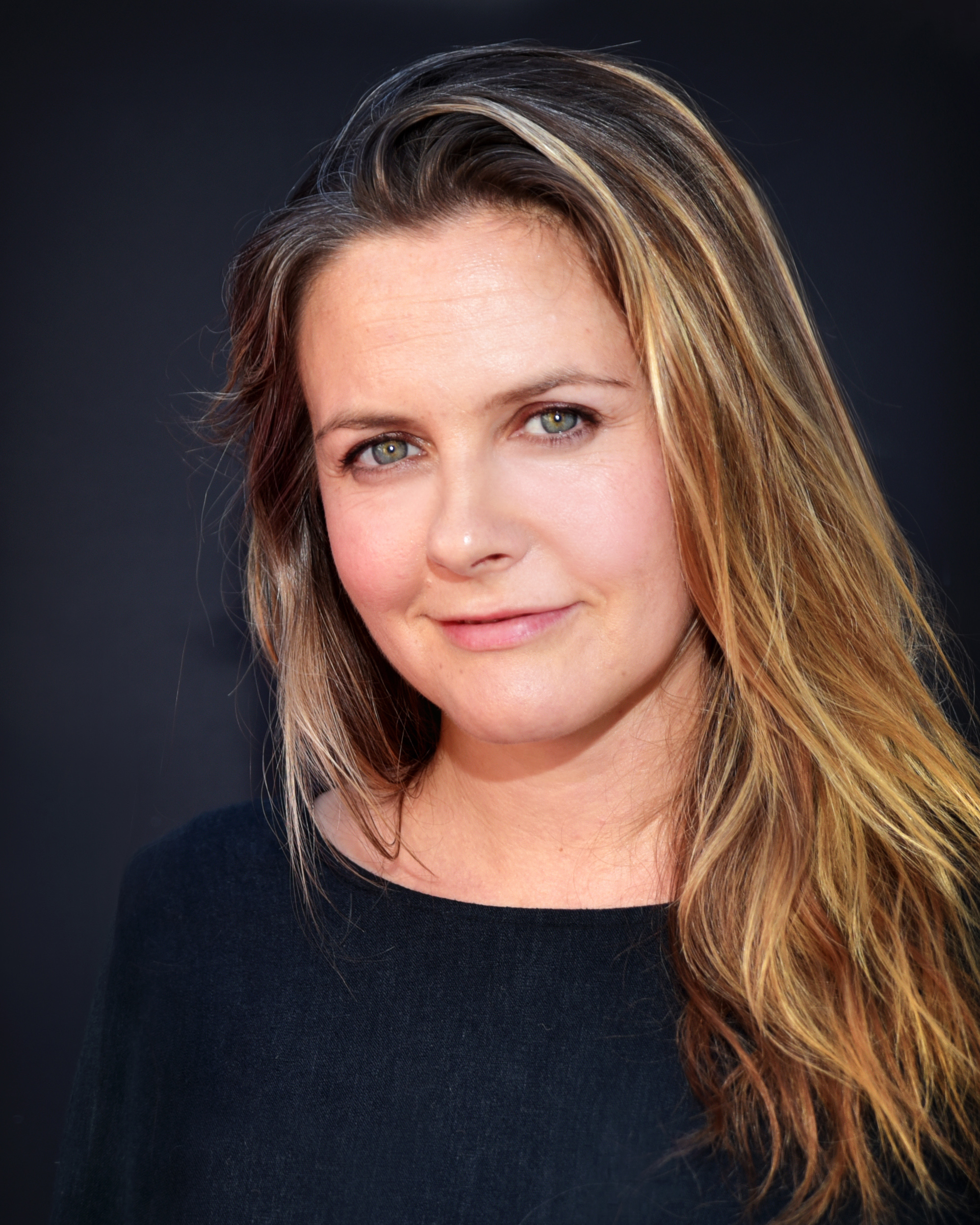
Alicia Silverstone

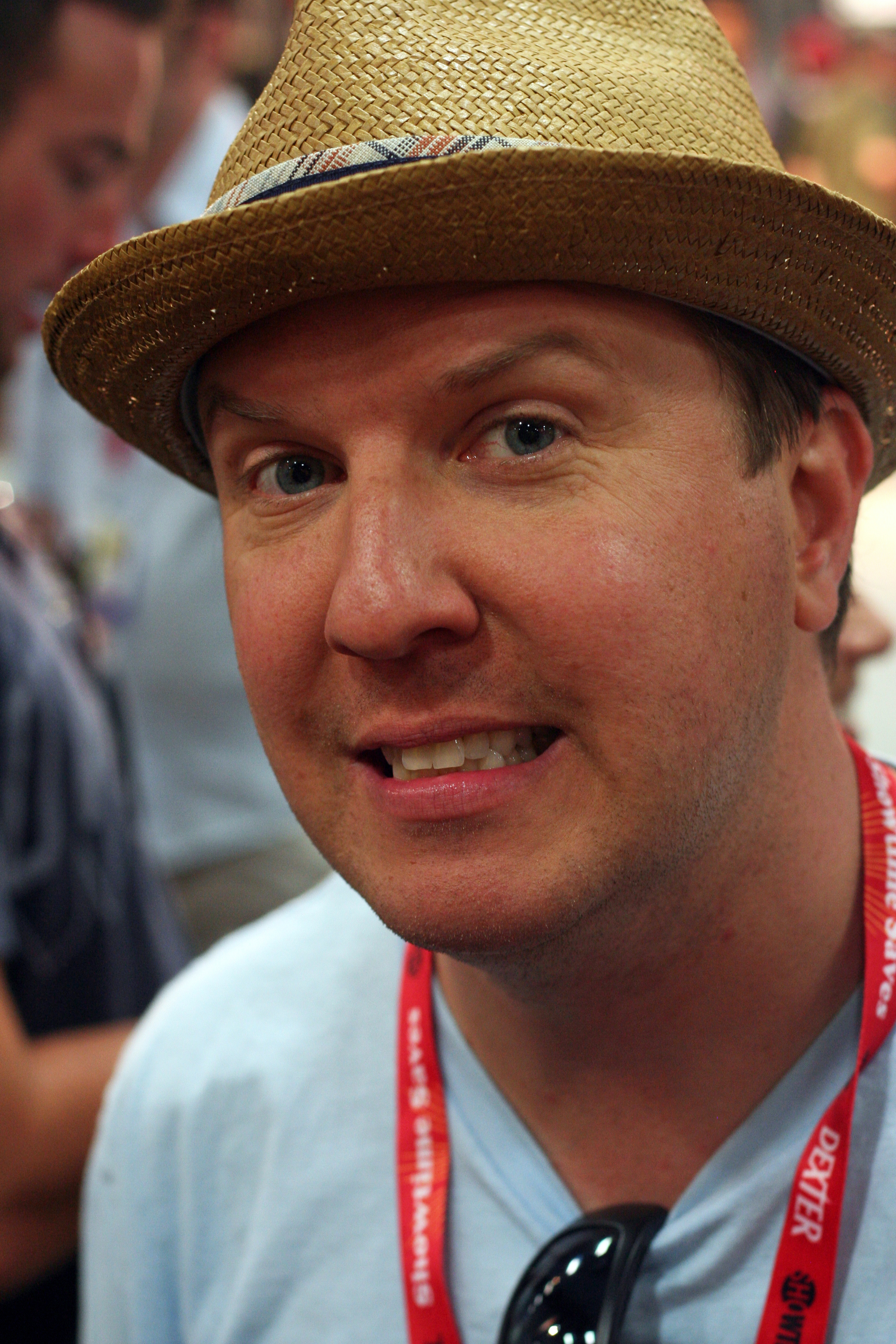
Nick Swardson

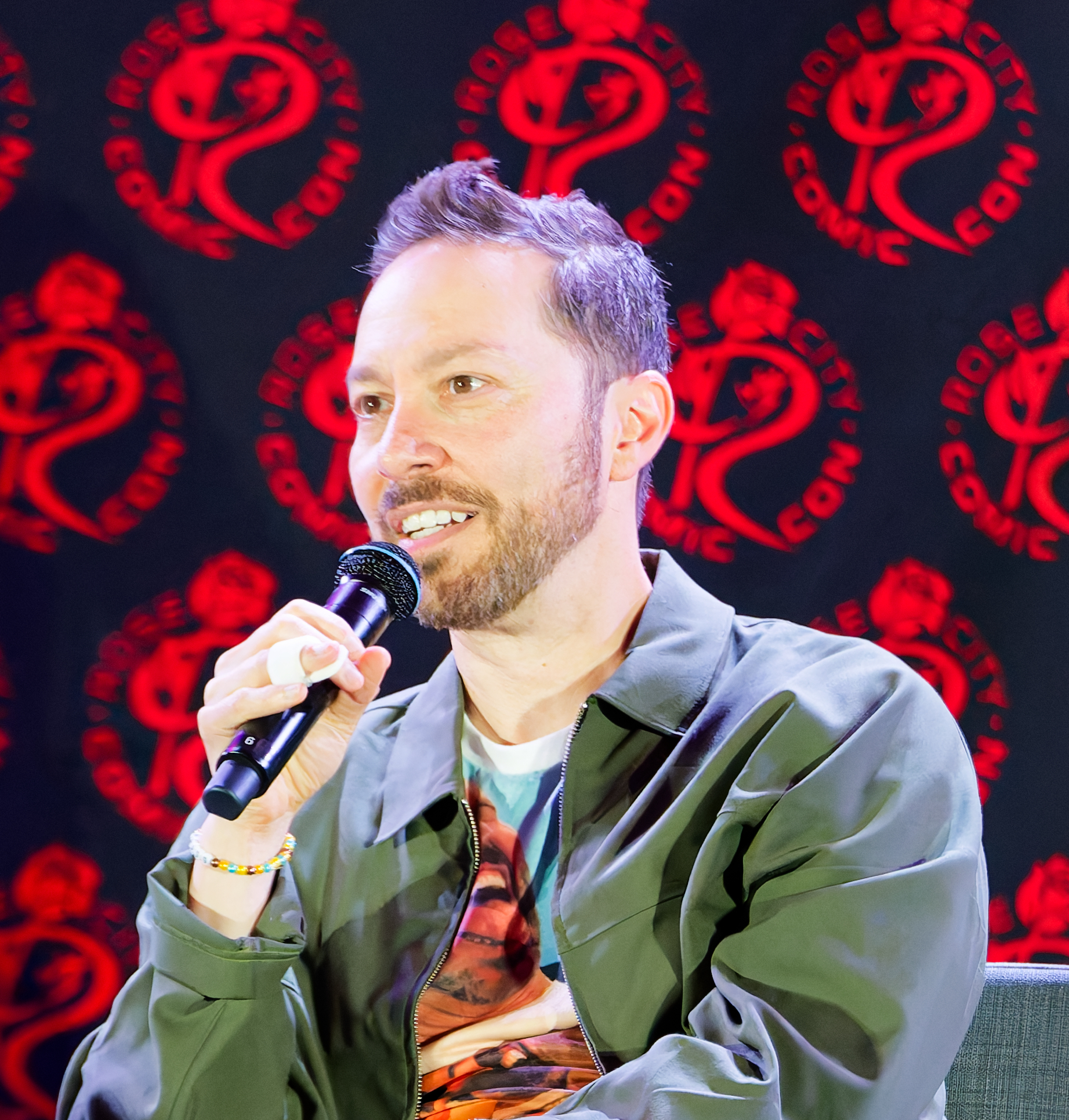
Sam Riegel

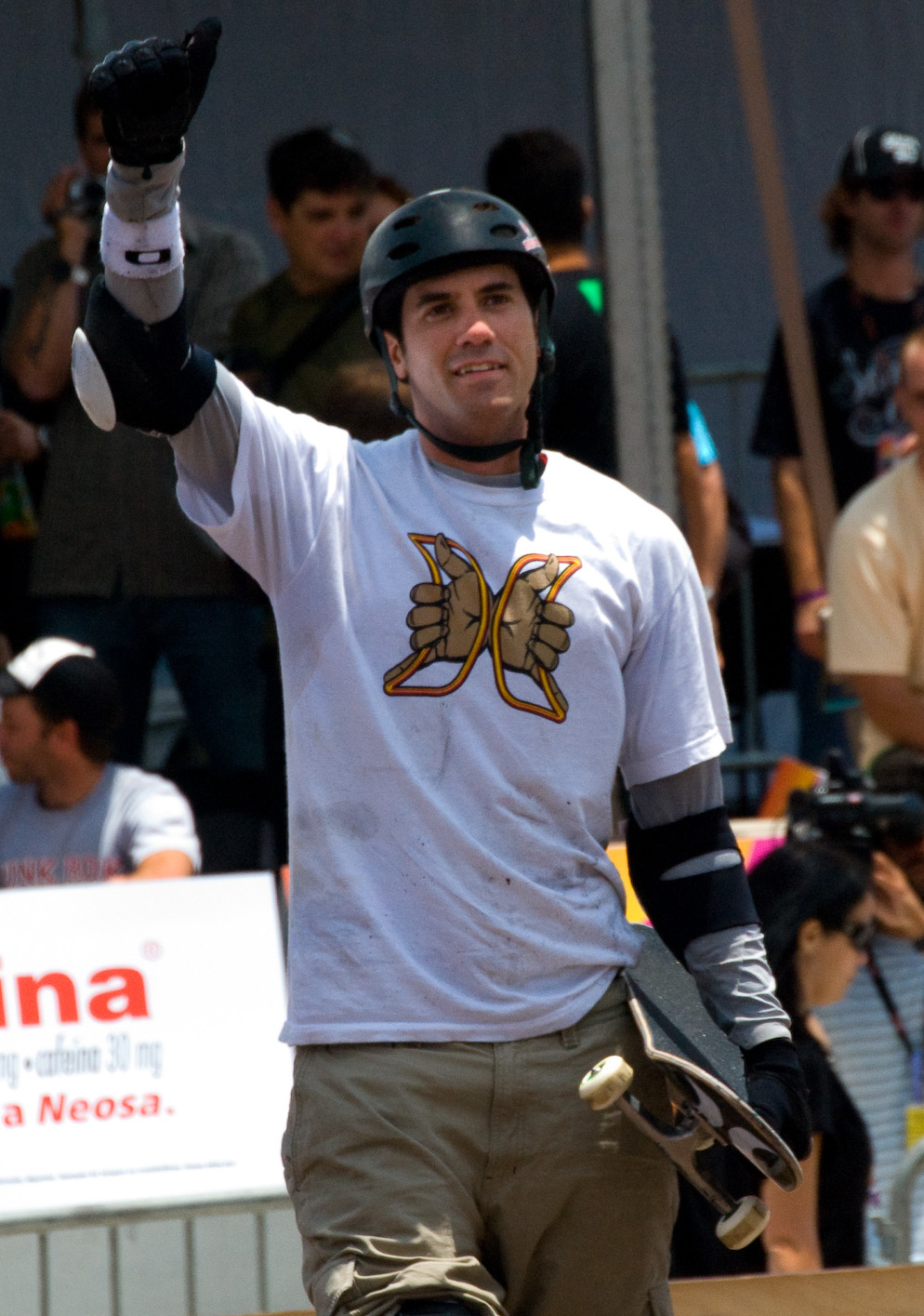
Bob Burnquist

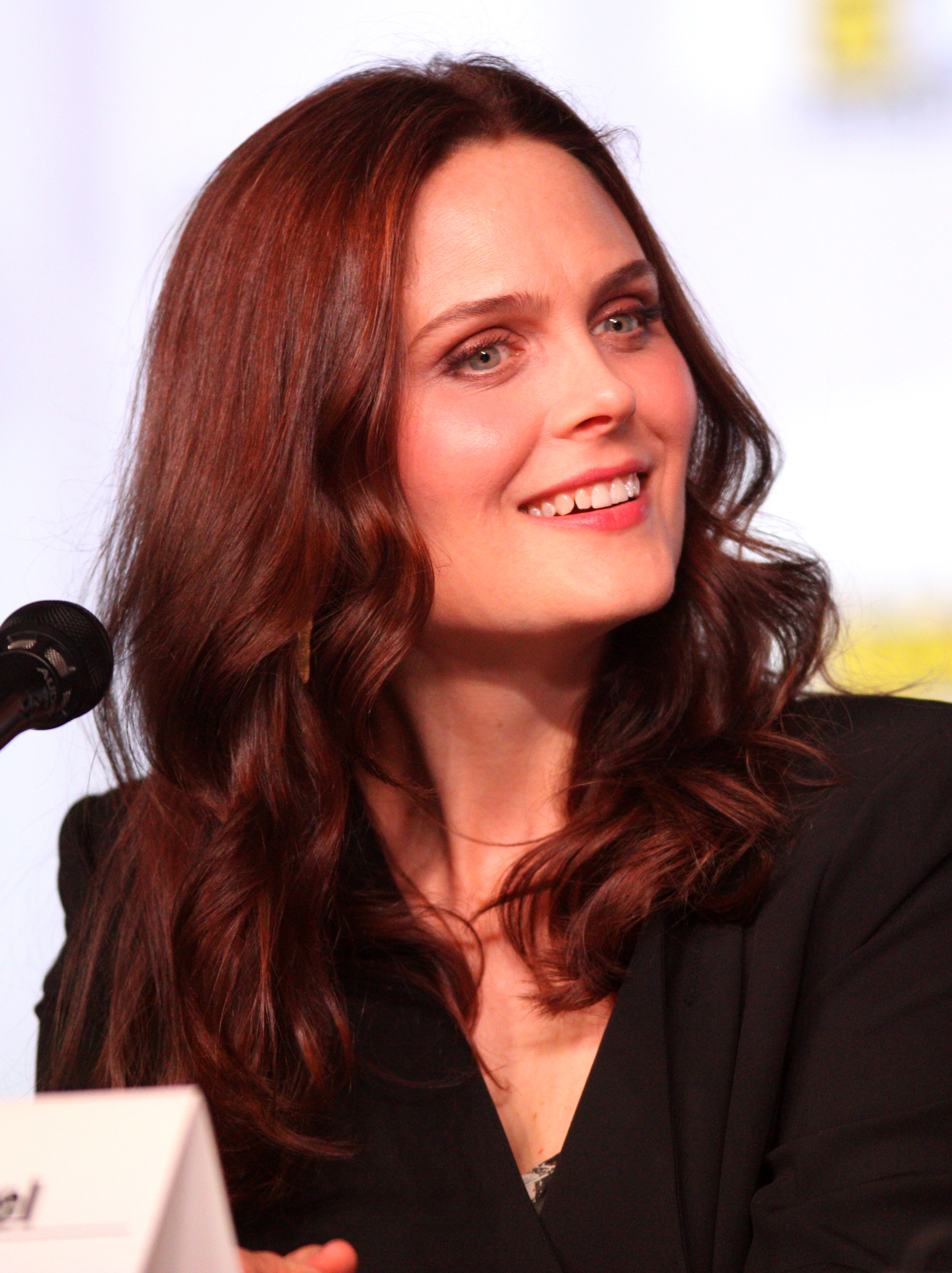
Emily Deschanel

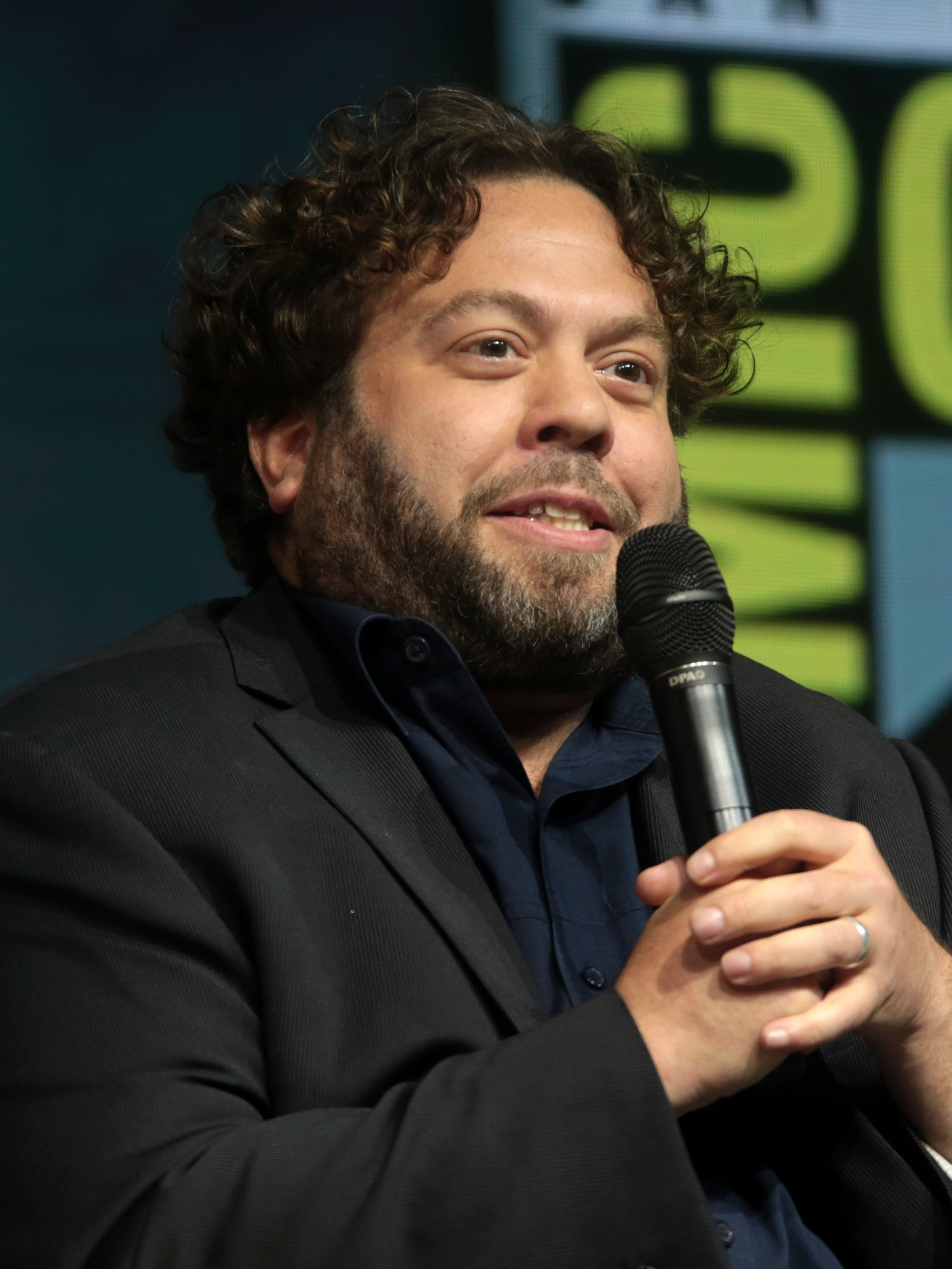
Dan Fogler

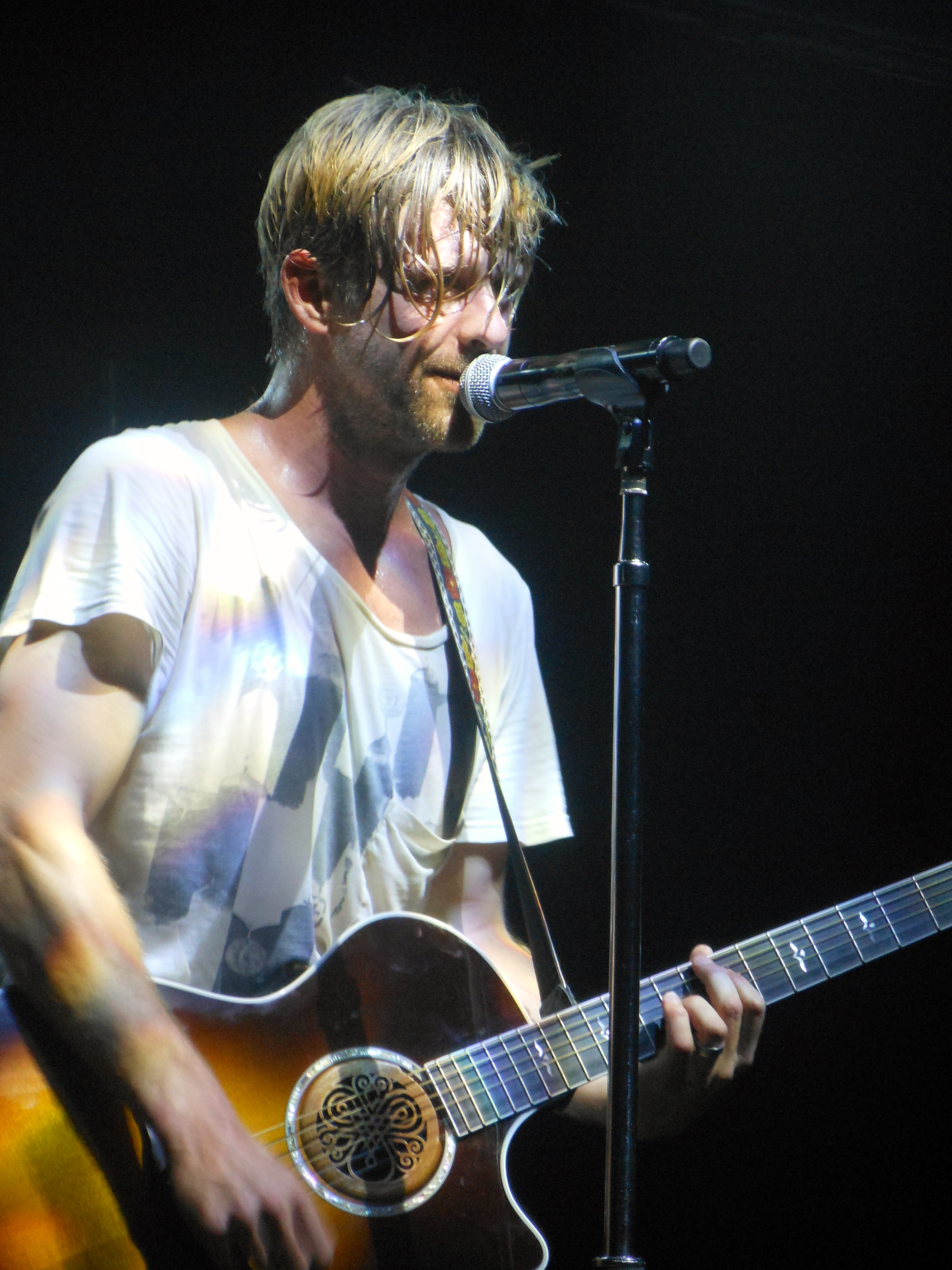
Jon Foreman

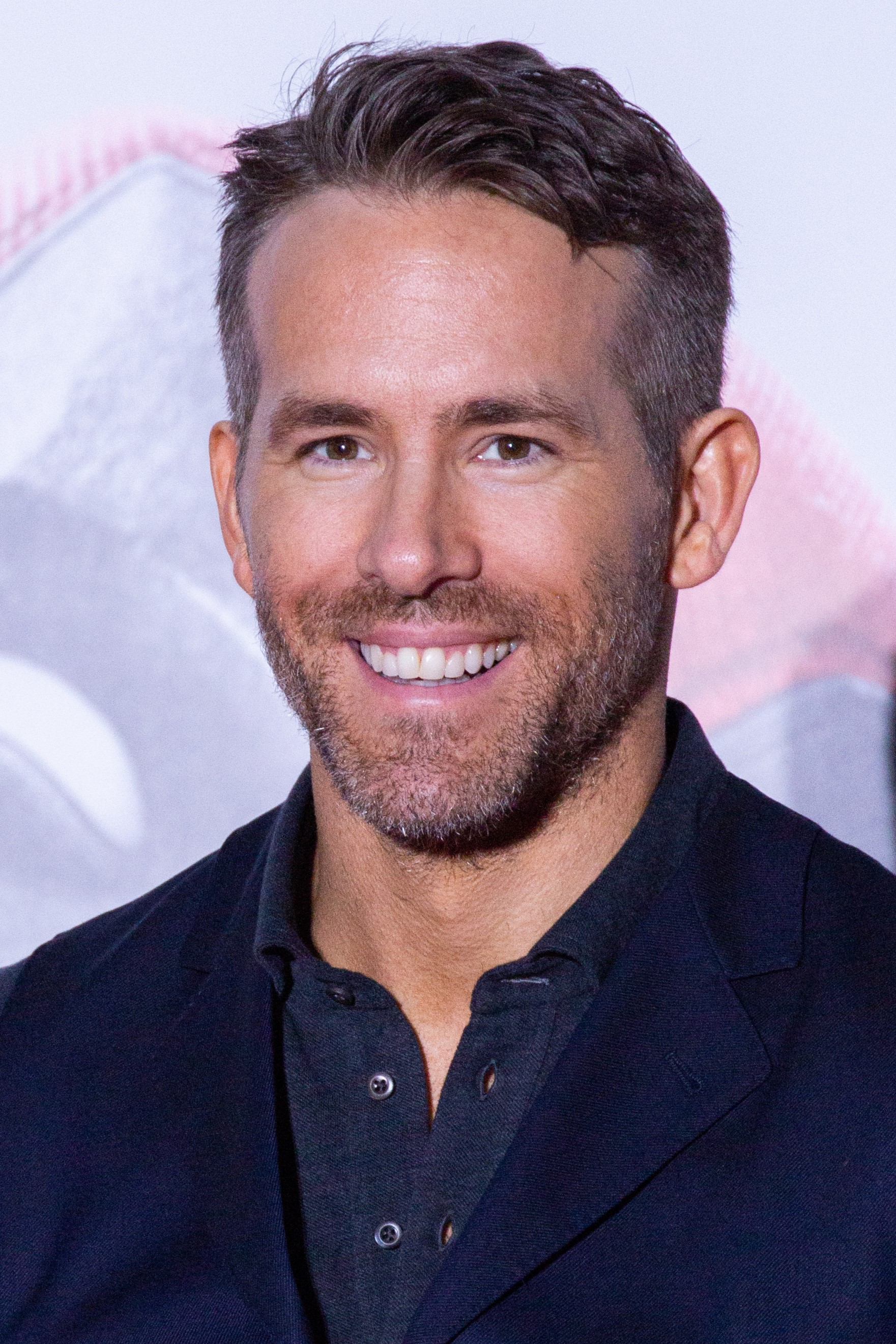
Ryan Reynolds

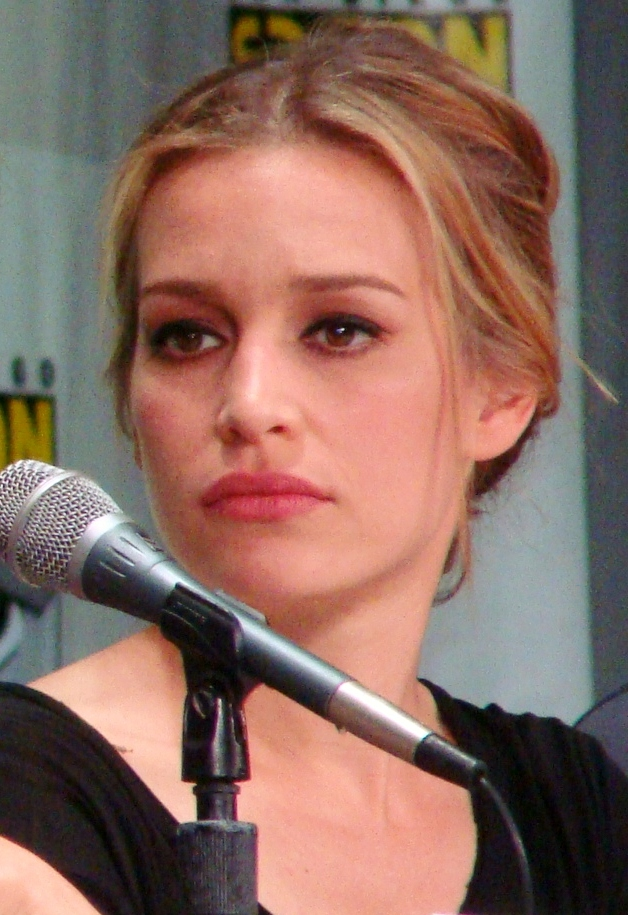
Piper Perabo

- October 1
  - Danielle Bisutti, actress and singer
  - Brian McFayden, television personality
- October 2
  - Eric Burlison, politician
  - Mandisa, gospel singer and American Idol contestant (d. 2024)
- October 3
  - Candy Apples, pornographic actress
  - Seann William Scott, actor and producer
- October 4
  - Carla Harvey, singer/songwriter, model, and co-vocalist for Butcher Babies
  - Alicia Silverstone, actress
- October 5 – Matt Hamill, mixed martial artist
- October 6 – Brett Gelman, actor and comedian
- October 7 – Taylor Hicks, singer and American Idol winner
- October 8
  - Kelly Armstrong, politician, 34th Governor of North Dakota
  - Blockhead, hip-hop record producer and DJ
  - Peter Stickles, actor
- October 9
  - William Alexander, writer and academic
  - Sam Riegel, voice actor and director
  - Nick Swardson, actor, stand-up comedian, and screenwriter
- October 10
  - Bob Burnquist, Brazilian-born skateboarder
  - Pat Burrell, baseball player
- October 11
  - Emily Deschanel, actress
  - Dave Briggs, journalist
- October 12
  - Ian Bell, media executive and CEO of Digital Trends
  - Tom Burke, football player
- October 13
  - Chris Jones, politician
  - Dave Knudson, guitarist
- October 14 – Scott Bradley, racing driver
- October 15
  - Jacob Bannon, singer and frontman for Converge
  - Michelle Beisner-Buck, NFL cheerleader and reporter
- October 18 – Hannah Pingree, politician
- October 19
  - Jeff Austin, baseball player
  - Diego Bernal, politician
  - Omar Gooding, actor
  - Breaux Greer, Olympic javelin thrower
  - Desmond Harrington, actor
  - Pete Loeffler, singer, guitarist, and frontman for Chevelle
  - Michael Young, baseball player
- October 20
  - Reidel Anthony, football player
  - Scott Blake, artist
  - Anna Boden, filmmaker
  - Dan Fogler, actor, comedian, and writer
  - Tim Kennedy, politician
- October 21
  - Jaime Andrews, actress, producer, business director, and playwright
  - Albrey Battle, football player
  - Jeremy Miller, actor
- October 22
  - Michael Barrett, baseball player
  - Brent Bartholomew, football player
  - Jon Foreman, singer/songwriter, guitarist, and frontman for Switchfoot
- October 23
  - Trevor Engelson, producer
  - Ryan Reynolds, Canadian-born actor
- October 24
  - Amy Allen, actress
  - Arturo Del Puerto, actor
- October 25
  - Michelle Biloon, comedian
  - Kristin Rossum, toxicologist and convicted murderer
- October 26 – Thurop Van Orman, animator and voice actor
- October 29
  - Marcus Amaker, poet
  - Glenn Berggoetz, director, writer, and actor
  - Milena Govich, actress, director, singer, dancer, and musician
- October 31
  - Seth Abramson, professor, attorney, author, political columnist, and poet
  - Piper Perabo, actress

=== November ===
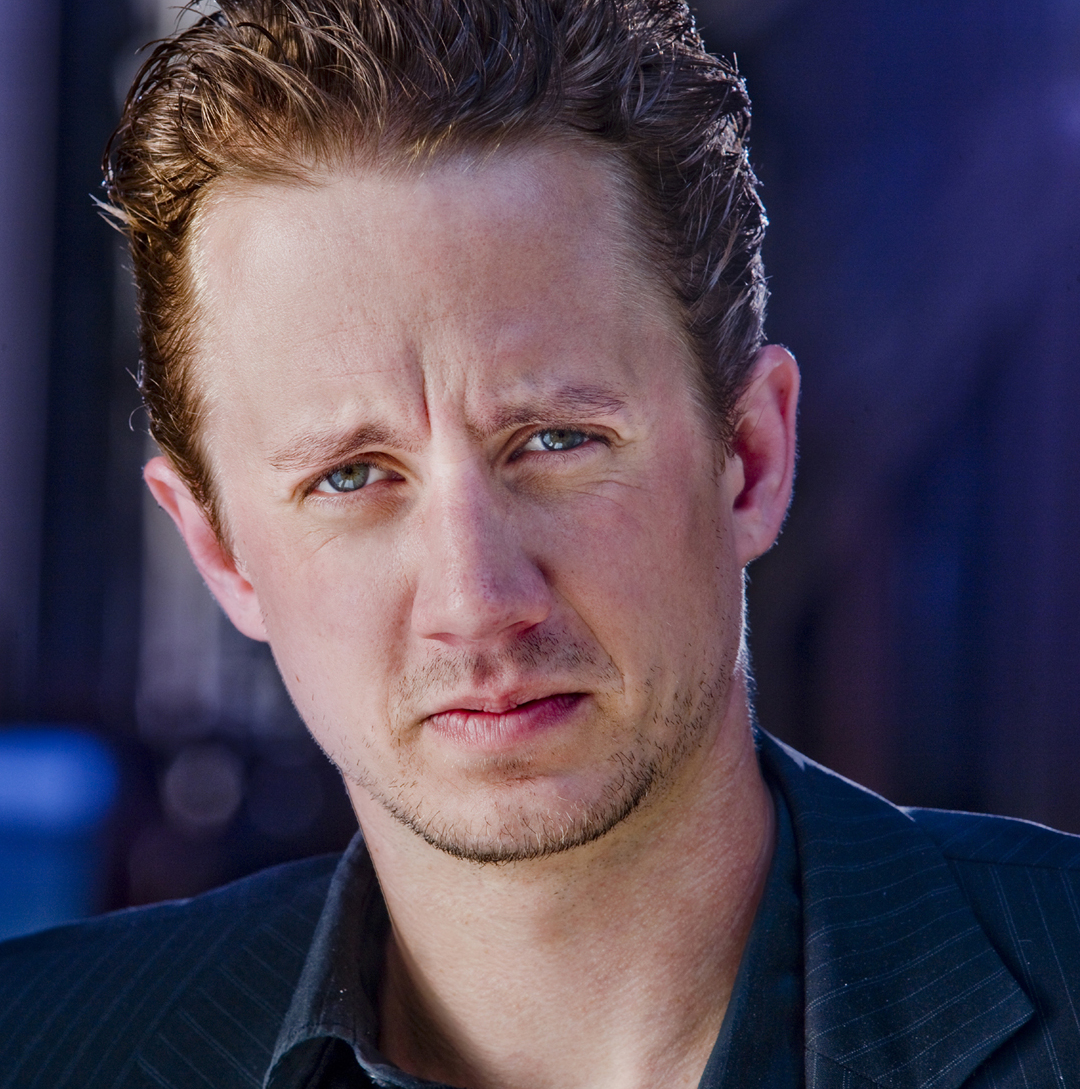
Chad Lindberg

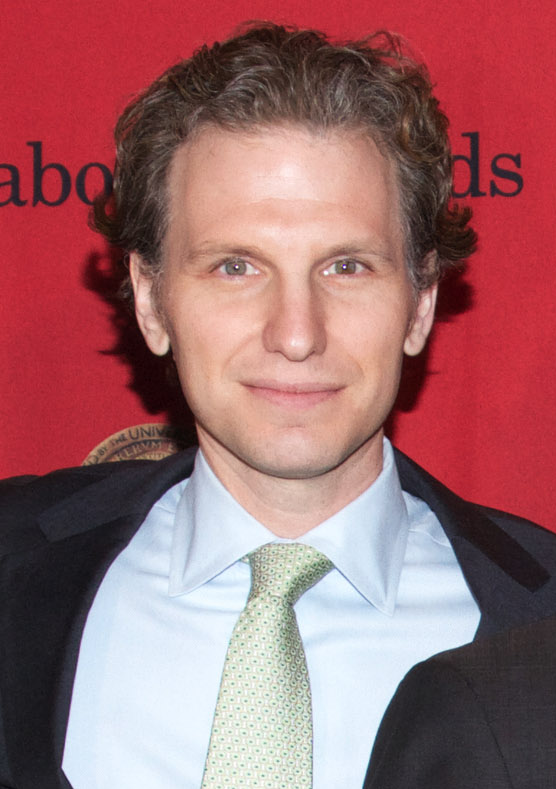
Sebastian Arcelus

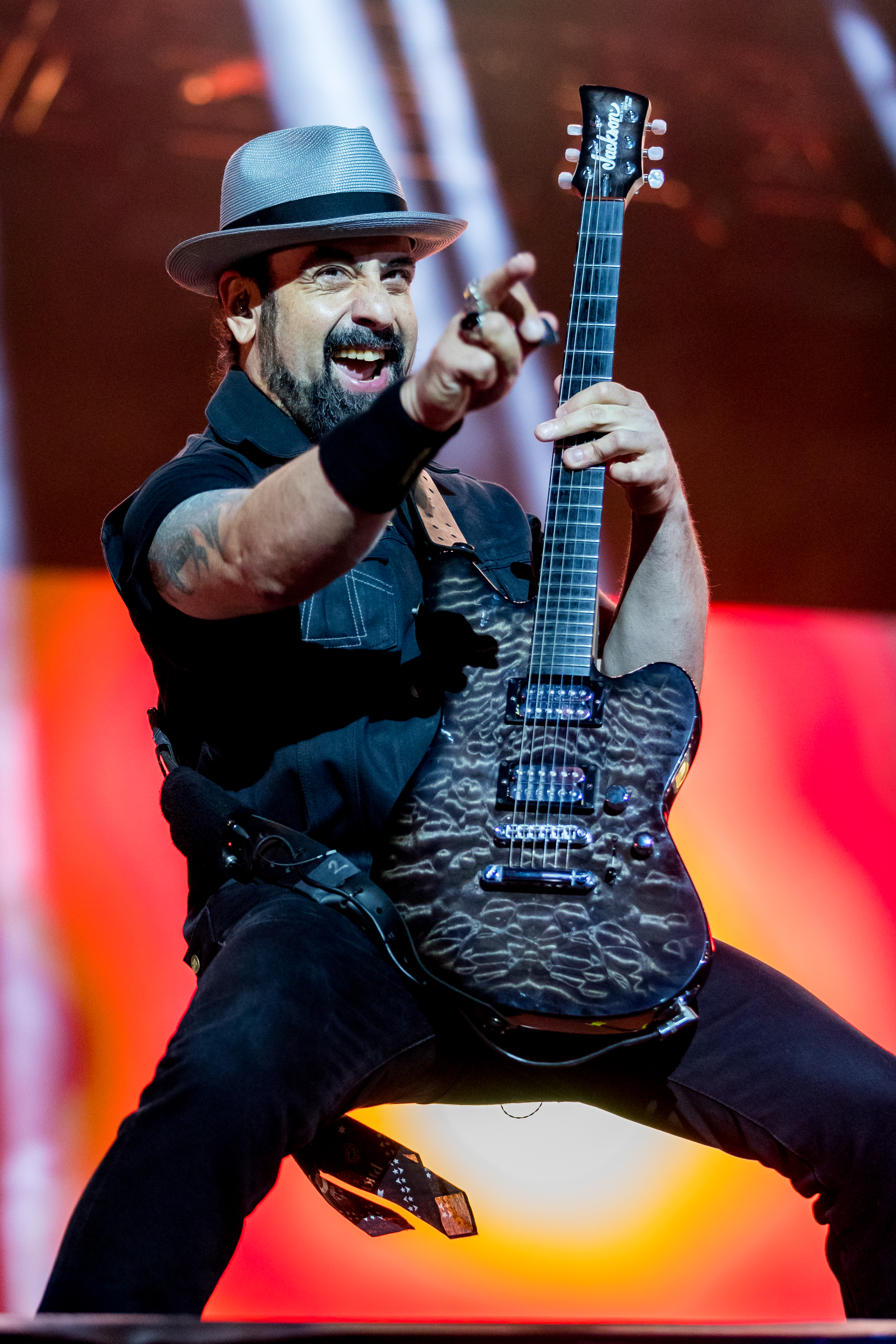
Rob Caggiano

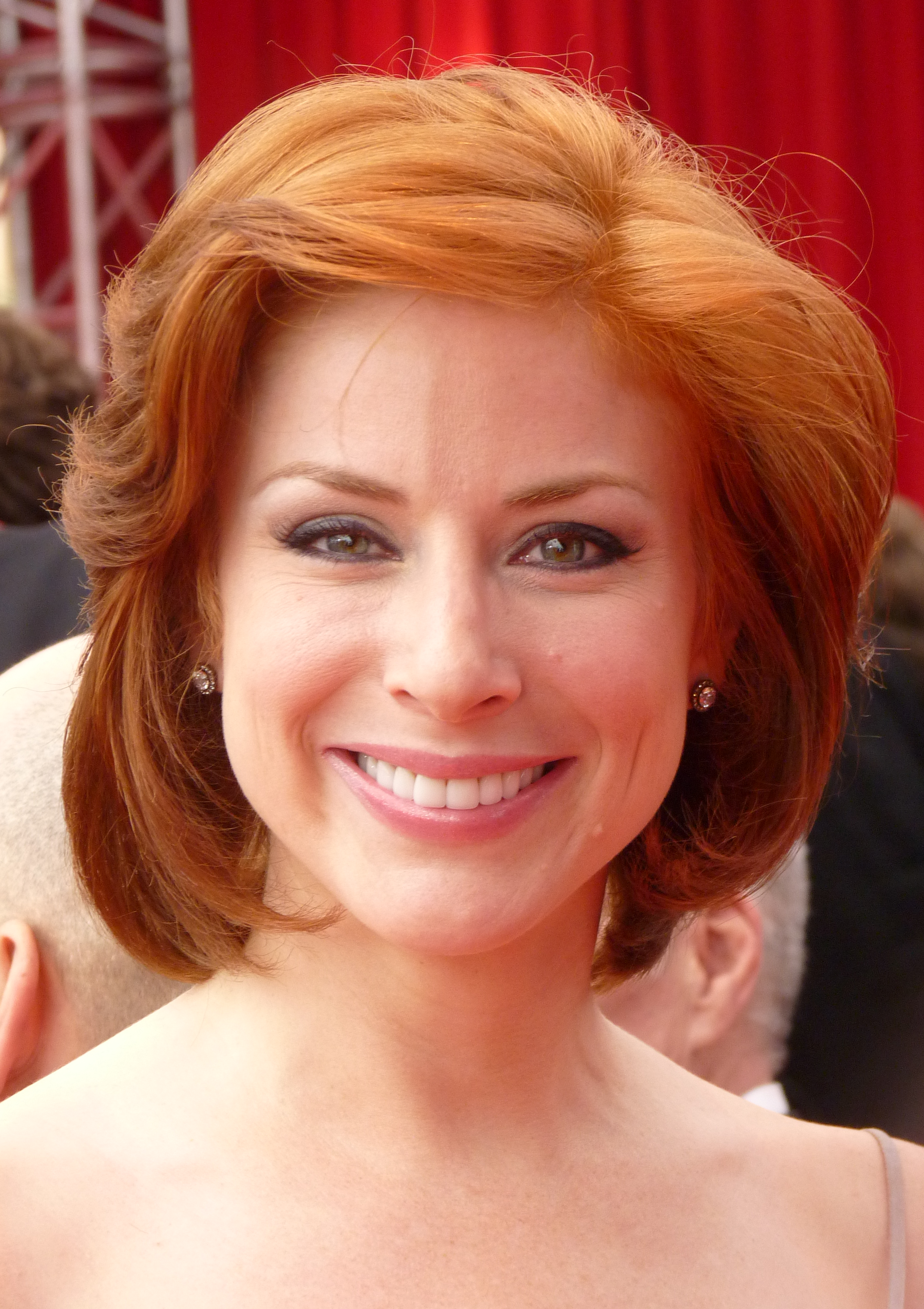
Diane Neal

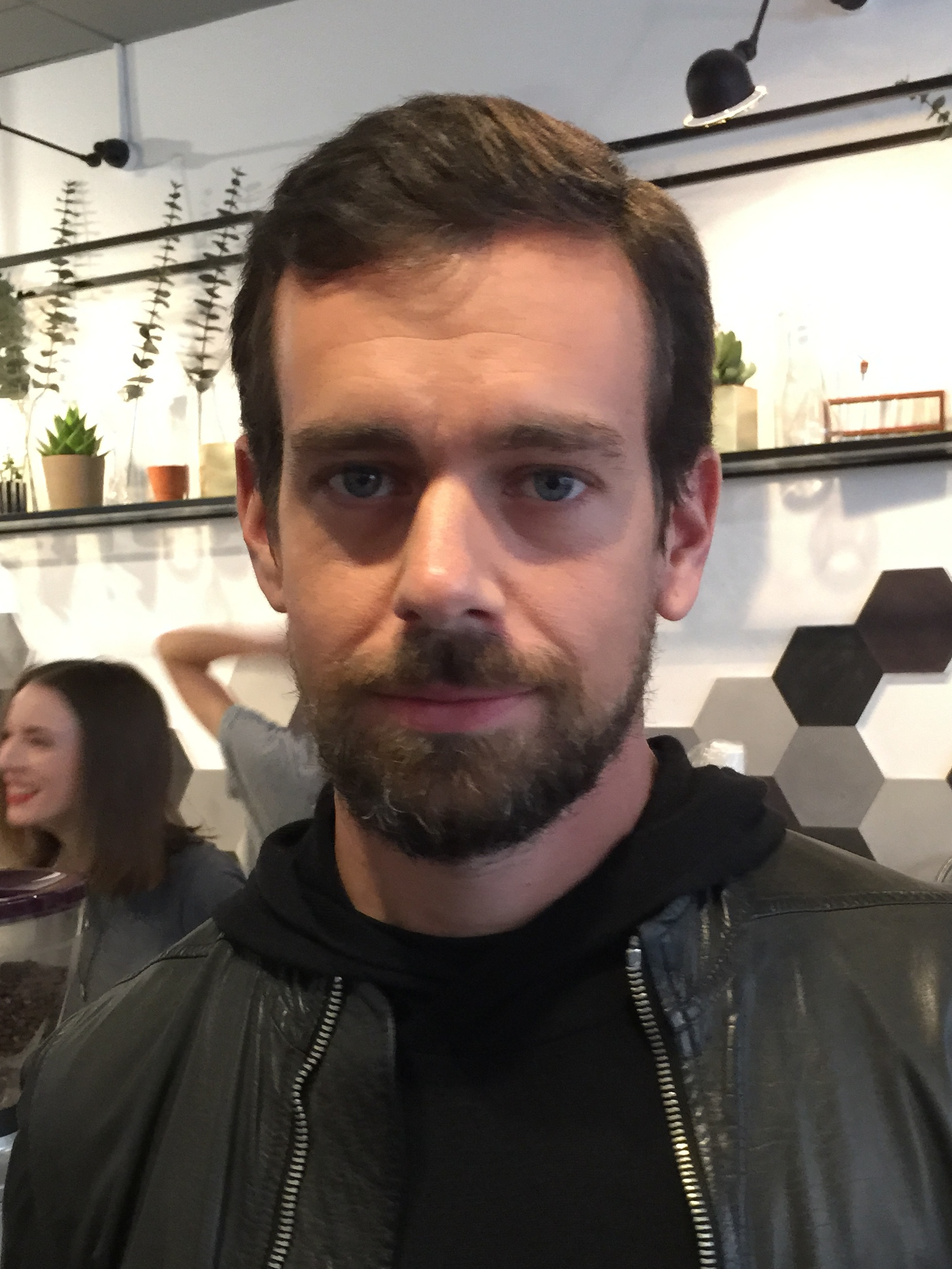
Jack Dorsey

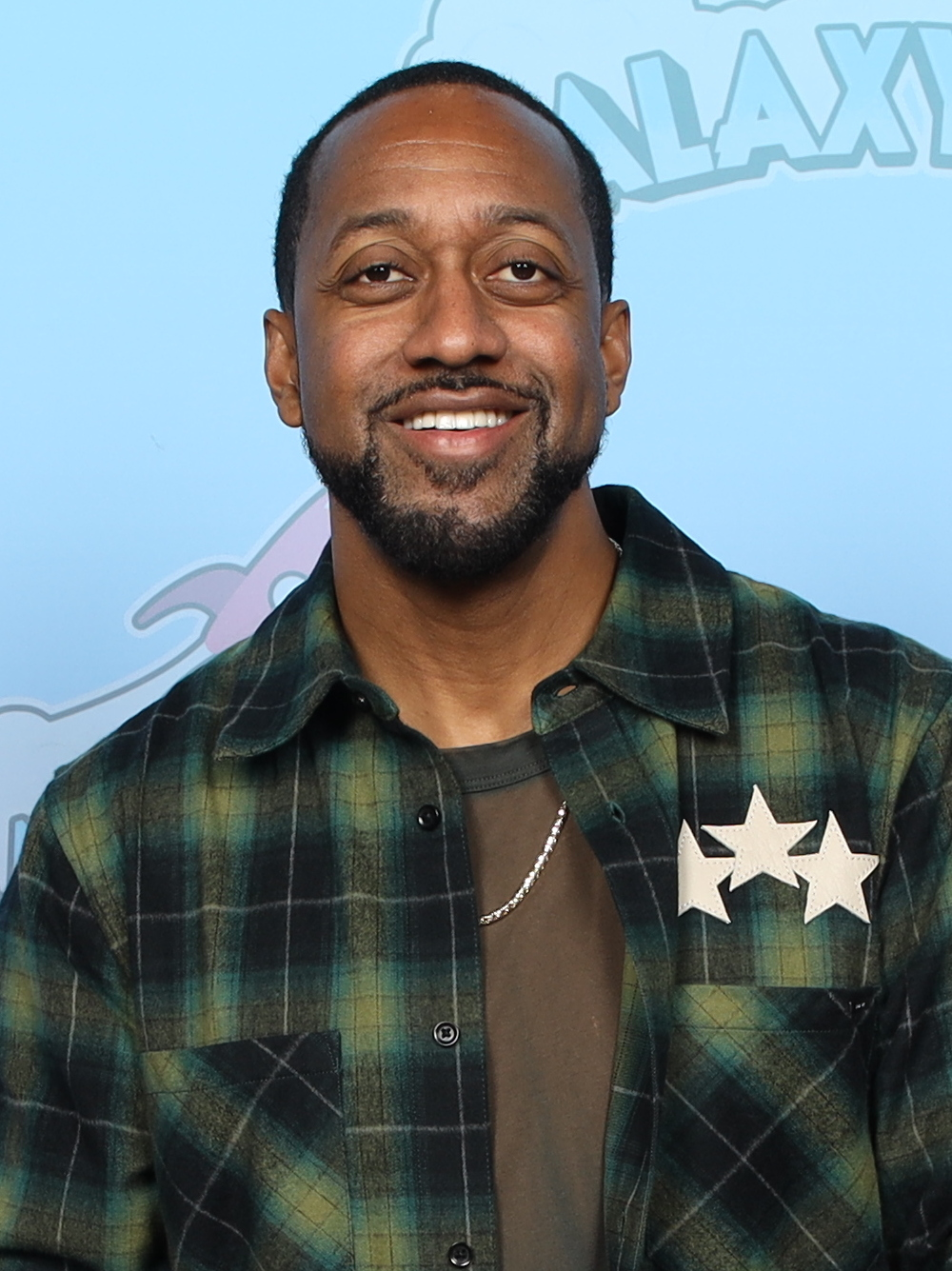
Jaleel White

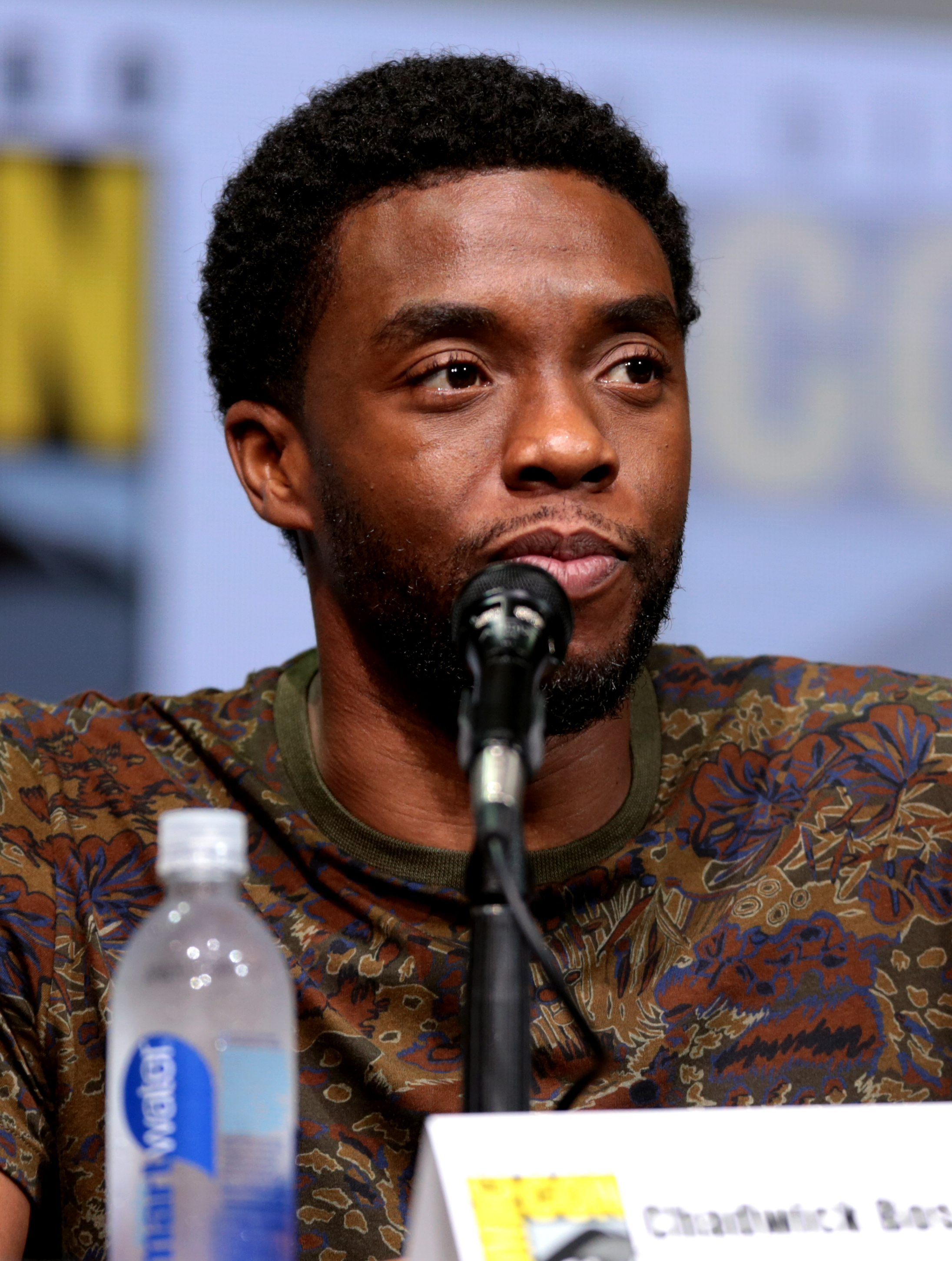
Chadwick Boseman

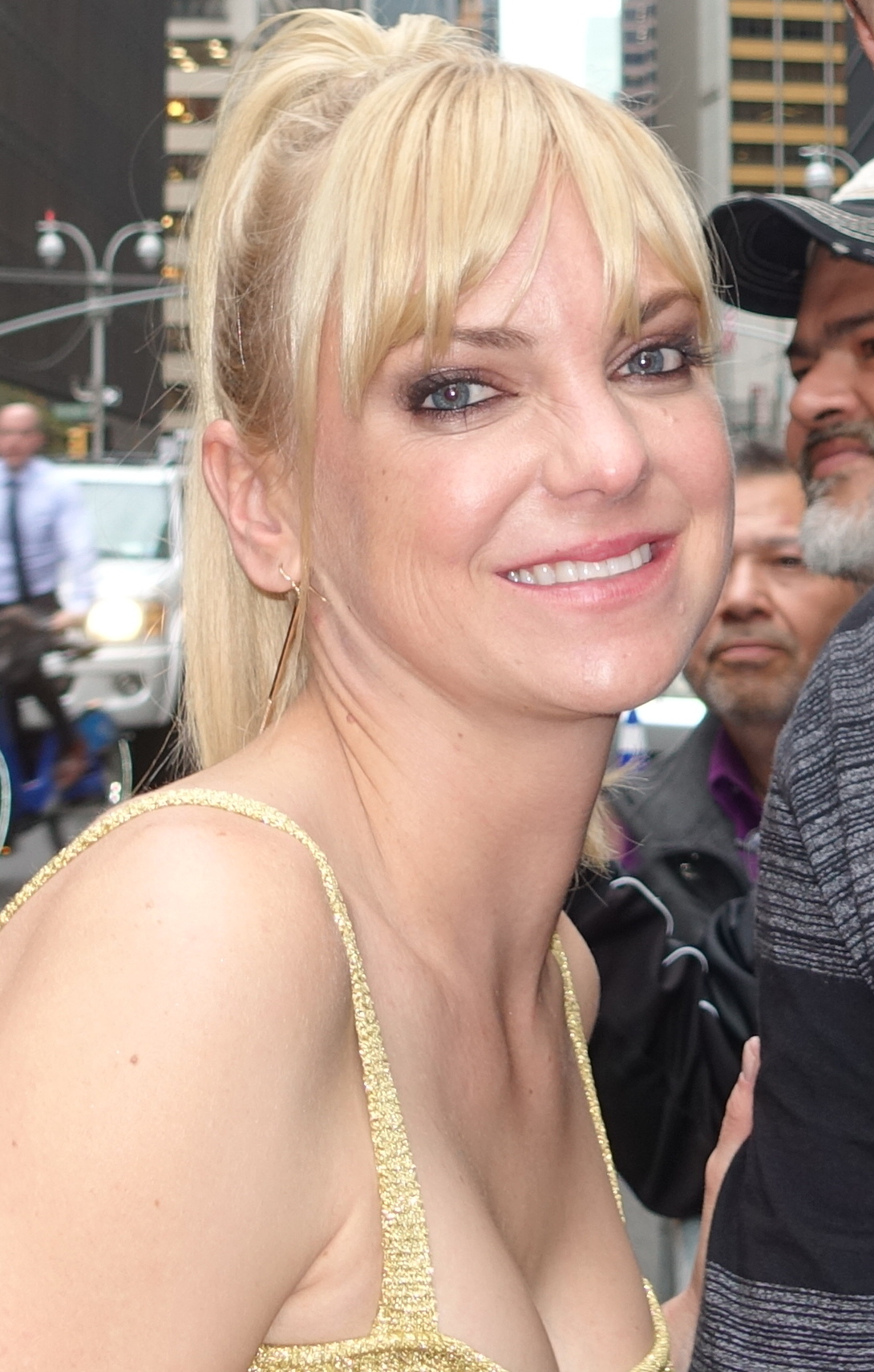
Anna Faris

- November 1
  - Aazaar Abdul-Rahim, football player and coach
  - Adah Almutairi, scientist
  - John Bevan, figure skater
  - Matthew Alan Chapman, writer, voice actor, director, animator, producer, and composer
  - Chad Lindberg, actor
  - Logan Marshall-Green, actor and filmmaker
  - Sam Presti, basketball executive, general manager of the NBA's Oklahoma City Thunder since 2007
- November 5
  - Sebastian Arcelus, actor
  - Jeff Klein, singer-songwriter and guitarist
  - Samuel Page, actor
  - Ben Quayle, lawyer and politician
- November 6
  - Laurie Baker, ice hockey player
  - Chris Bell, football player
  - Jeremy Borseth, football player
  - Jace Bugg, golfer (d. 2003)
  - Rob Buyea, author
  - Troy Hambrick, football player
  - Mike Herrera, singer/songwriter, bassist, and frontman for MxPx, Tumbledown, and Goldfinger
  - Pat Tillman, football player, victim of friendly fire (d. 2004)
  - Sal Vulcano, actor and comedian
  - Wiley Wiggins, actor
- November 7
  - Paul Boyd, Canadian-born journalist
  - Rob Caggiano, guitarist for Volbeat
- November 9
  - Jamal Brooks, football player
  - Josh Kaufman, singer/songwriter, winner of The Voice (Season 6)
- November 11
  - Allister Adel, attorney and politician (d. 2022)
  - Corey Atkins, football player
- November 12
  - Matt Bowen, football player
  - Tevin Campbell, singer and actor
- November 14
  - Tyson Ballou, model
  - Tiffiny Blacknell, lawyer
- November 15
  - Malar Balasubramanian, pediatrician convicted of involuntary manslaughter (d. 2017)
  - Brian Banks, politician
- November 16 – Trevor Brazile, rodeo competitor
- November 17
  - Brandon Call, actor
  - Diane Neal, actress
- November 18
  - Jessi Alexander, country singer/songwriter
  - Dominic Armato, voice actor, journalist, and food critic
  - Ashley Berggren, basketball player
- November 19
  - Happy Anderson, actor
  - Eric Bostrom, motorcycle racer
  - Jesse Brinkley, boxer
  - Jack Dorsey, computer programmer and Internet entrepreneur, co-founder of Twitter
- November 20 – Dominique Dawes, Olympic gymnast
- November 21 – Yoon Ahn, fashion designer
- November 22
  - Oliver Ackermann, rock musician and founder of Death by Audio
  - Kate Barber, field hockey player
- November 23 – Page Kennedy, actor and rapper
- November 24
  - Matt Brown, parathlete
  - Jorge Elorza, politician, mayor of Providence, Rhode Island
  - Michael Roof, actor (d. 2009)
- November 25
  - Aziza Baccouche, physicist and science filmmaker (d. 2021)
  - Donovan McNabb, football player
- November 26
  - Keith Beach, soccer player
  - Maia Campbell, actress and singer
- November 27 – Jaleel White, actor
- November 28
  - Adam Bernero, baseball player
  - Elle Simone, chef (d. 2026)
- November 29
  - Chris Akins, football player
  - Ricardo Almeida, mixed martial artist
  - Lindsay Benko, Olympic swimmer
  - Chadwick Boseman, actor and playwright (d. 2020)
  - Anna Faris, actress
  - Ehren McGhehey, stunt performer and actor
- November 30 – Shawn Bryson, football player

=== December ===
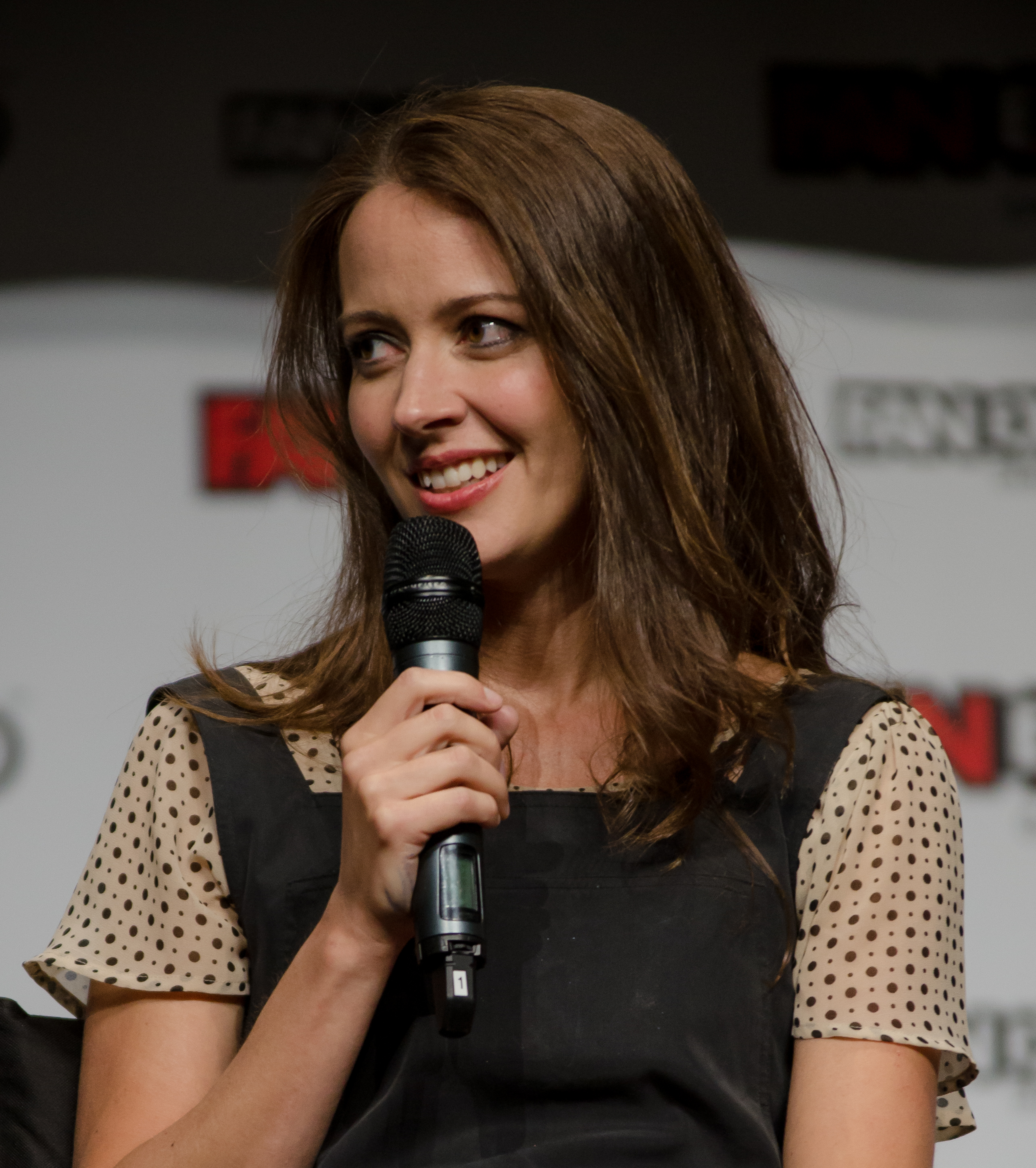
Amy Acker

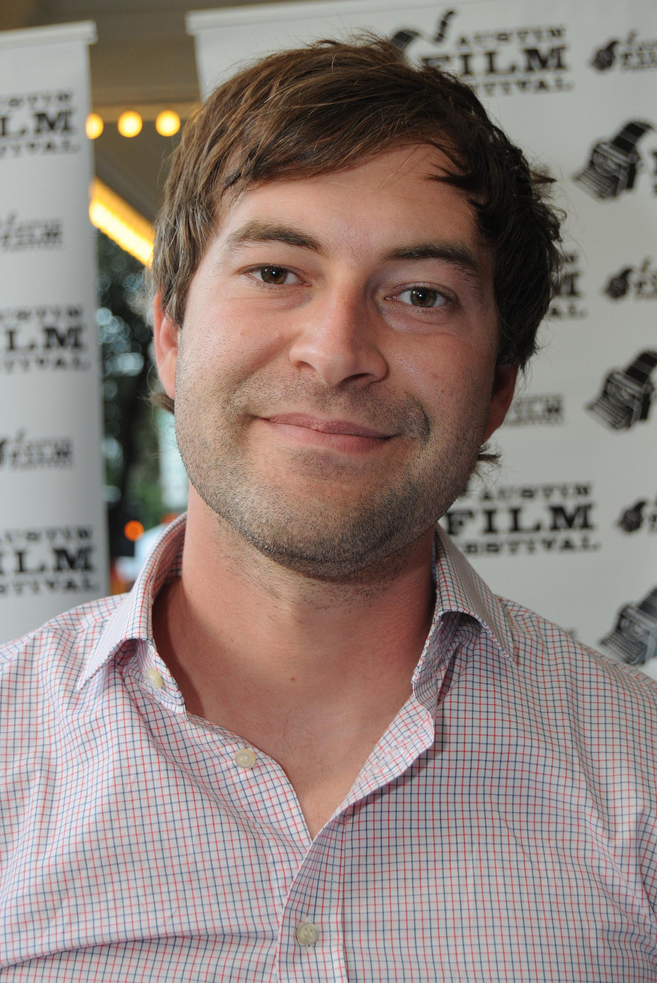
Mark Duplass

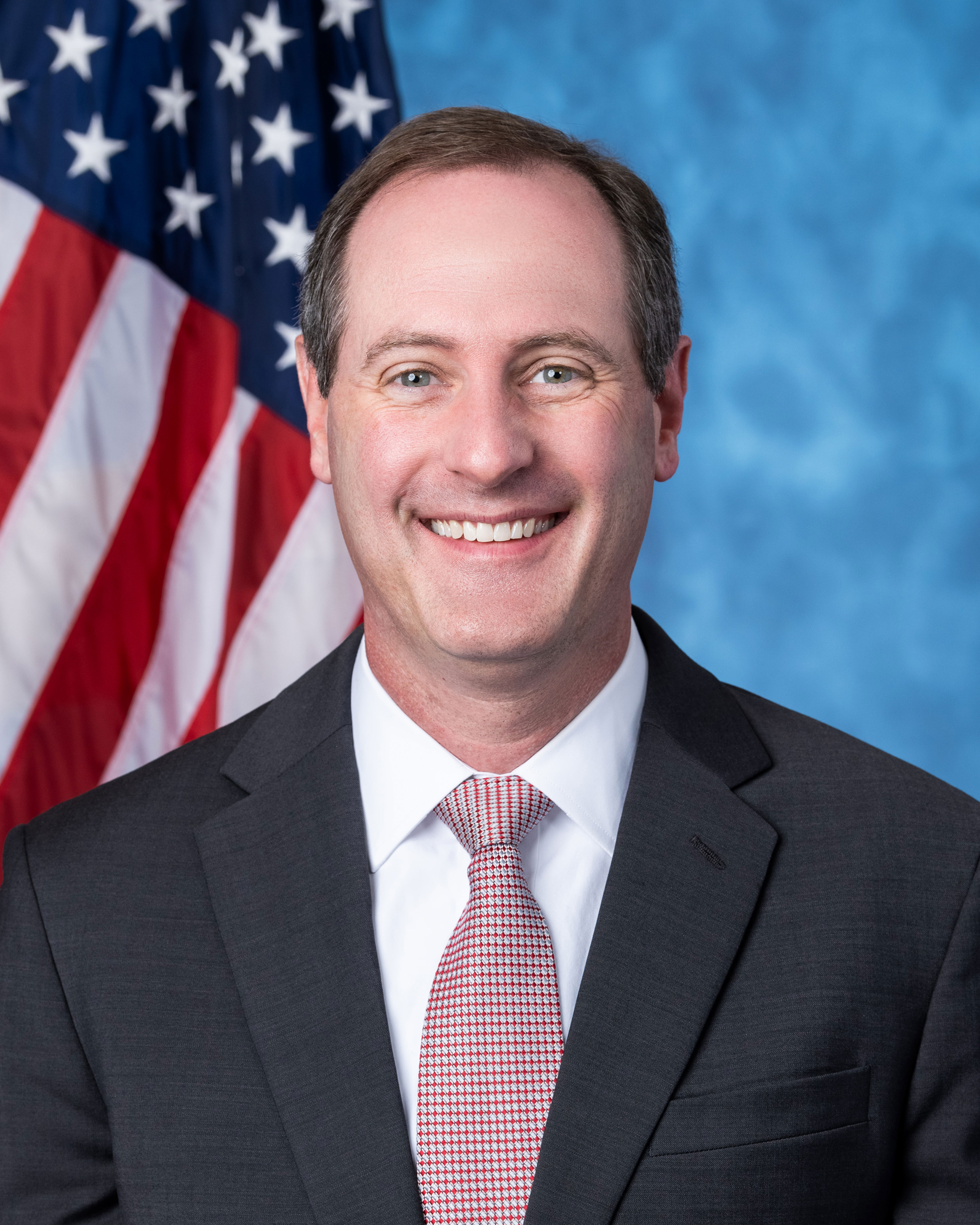
Tracey Mann

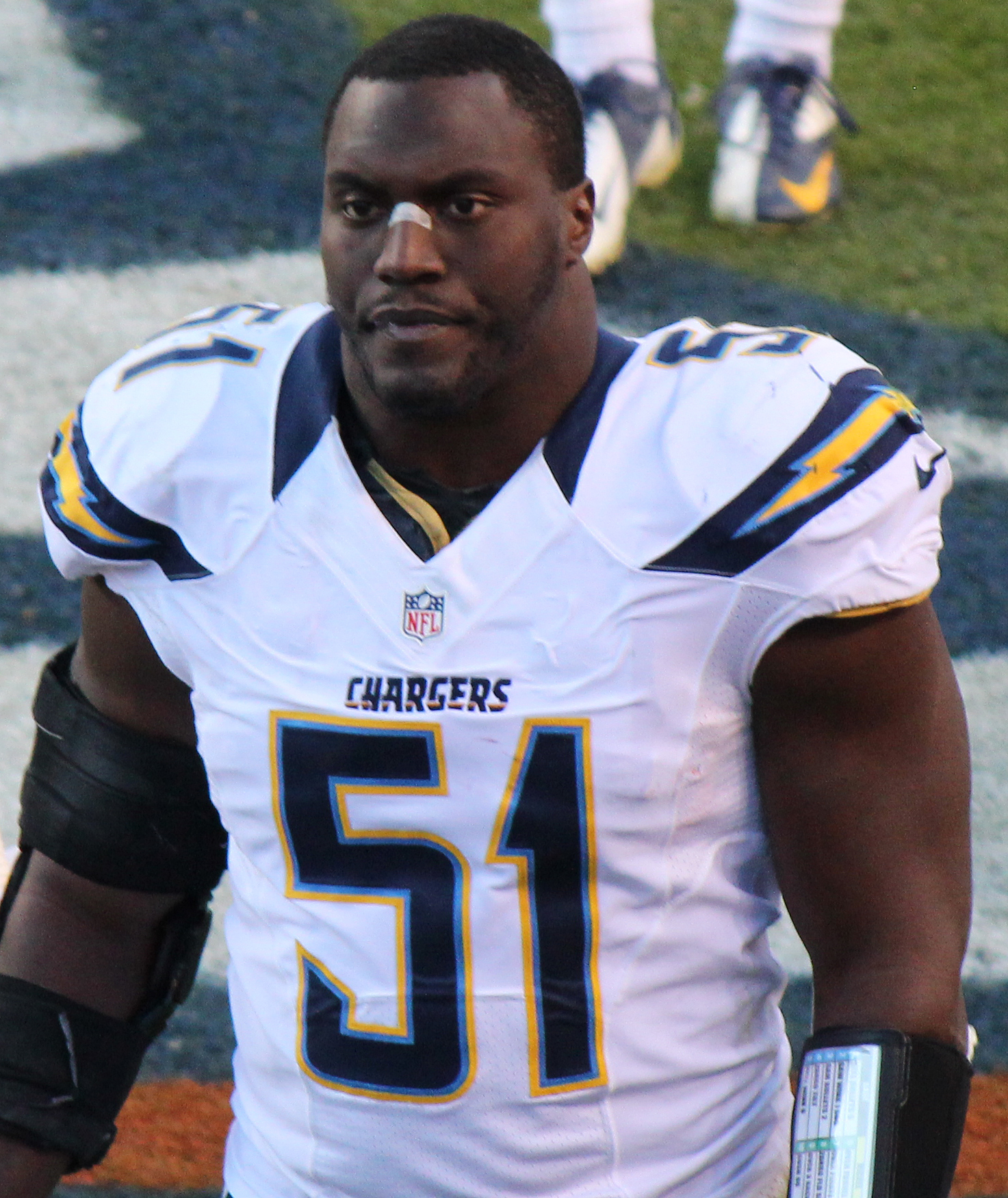
Takeo Spikes

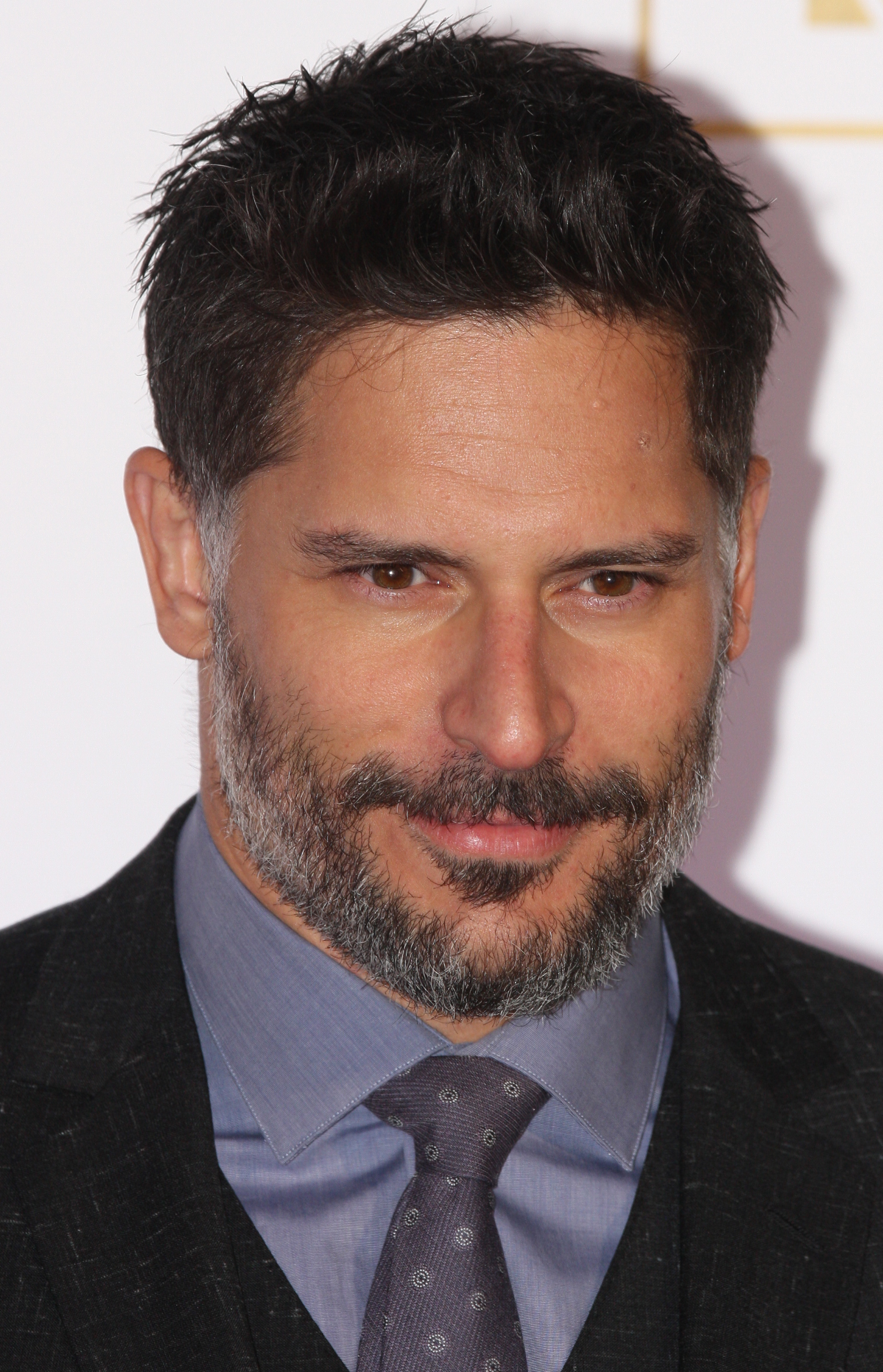
Joe Manganiello

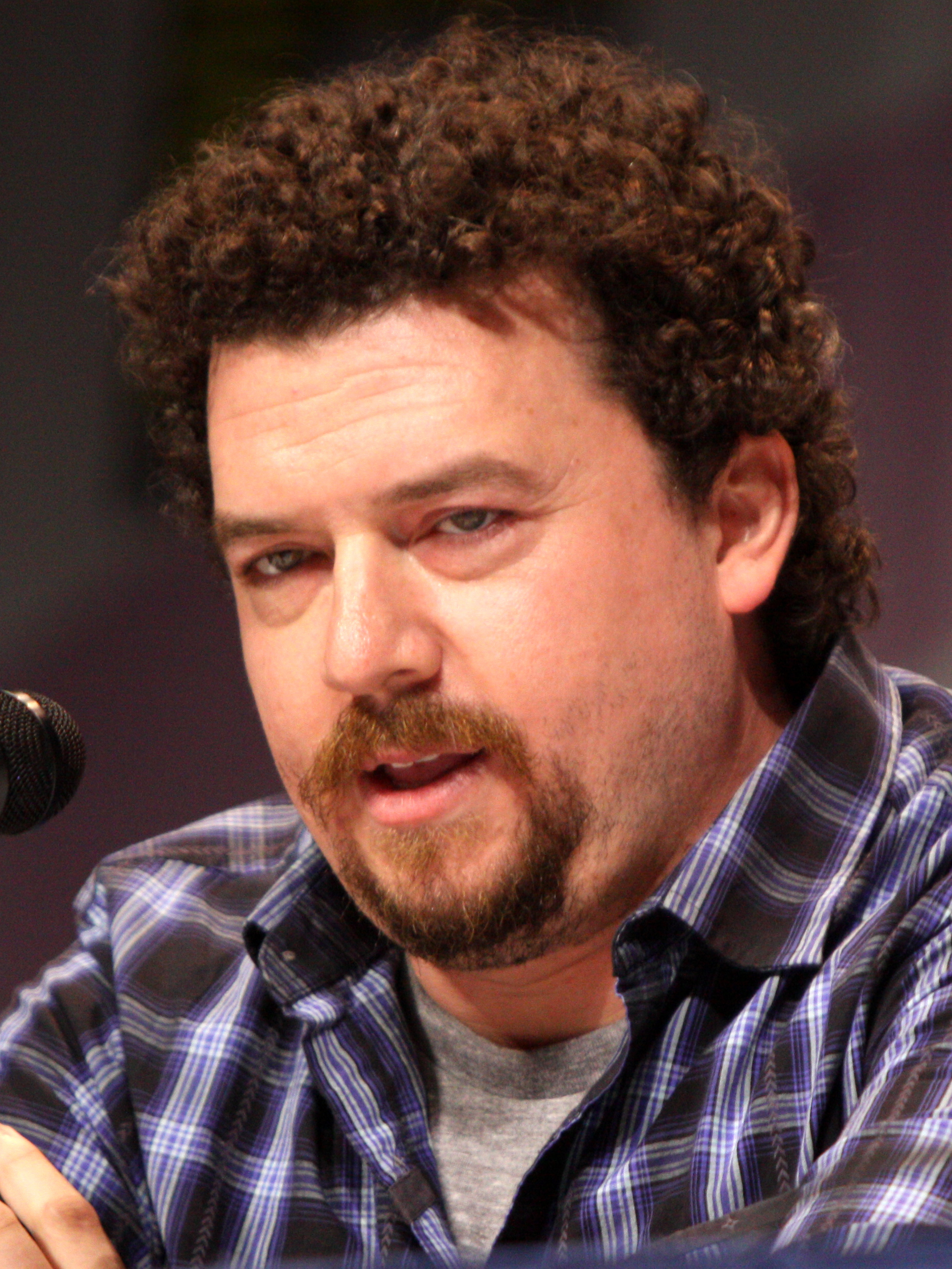
Danny McBride

- December 1
  - Matthew Shepard, murder victim (d. 1998)
  - Laura Ling, journalist, imprisoned by North Korea in 2009
- December 2 – Jamie Barnette, football player
- December 3
  - Cornelius Griffin, football player
  - Scooter Page, actor, musician, and songwriter
- December 4
  - Amie Comeaux, country music singer (d. 1997)
  - Greg Landsman, politician
- December 5
  - Amy Acker, actress
  - Amanda Adkins, Olympic swimmer
- December 6 – Séverine Autesserre, French-born author and researcher
- December 7
  - Mark Duplass, actor, screenwriter, and director
  - Duncan D. Hunter, politician
  - T.J. Lavin, BMX cyclist and television host
- December 8 – Ryan Blackwell, basketball player and coach
- December 9
  - Phil Armour, football player
  - Chris Booker, baseball player
  - Jimmy Brumbaugh, football player
- December 10 – Tim Ashe, politician
- December 11 – Shareef Abdur-Rahim, basketball player and president of the NBA G League since 2019
- December 12 – Eric M. Bromwell, politician
- December 14
  - Tammy Blanchard, actress
  - Leland Chapman, bail bondsman
- December 16 – Ryan Aument, politician
- December 17
  - Dan Hageman, screenwriter and television producer
  - Tracey Mann, politician
  - Takeo Spikes, football player
- December 19 – Beau Archibald, basketball player and coach
- December 20
  - Michael Binger, poker player
  - David Bronson, singer/songwriter
  - Aubrey Huff, baseball player and radio host
- December 21
  - Christie Ambrosi, softball player
  - Lamont Bagby, politician
  - Andy Gipson, politician
- December 23
  - Raheem Beyah, computer engineer, researcher, and educator
  - Kris Brown, football player
  - Jamie Noble, wrestler
- December 24
  - Shalanda Baker, Director of the Office of Economic Impact and Diversity at the US Department of Energy (2022-present)
  - Chris Bober, football player
- December 25 – Tim James, basketball player and coach
- December 26 – Jeffery Lee, convicted murderer (d. 2026)
- December 27
  - Tim Arson, wrestler (d. 2015)
  - Aaron Stanford, actor
- December 28
  - Brendan Hines, actor and singer
  - Joe Manganiello, actor
- December 29
  - Thomas Blake, tennis player
  - Danny McBride, actor, comedian, and writer
- December 31
  - Christopher B. Anderson, ecologist
  - Vanessa Kerry, physician and health care administrator
  - Clayton Morris, YouTuber, real estate investor, and news anchor
  - Chris Terrio, film director/screenwriter

=== Full date unknown ===
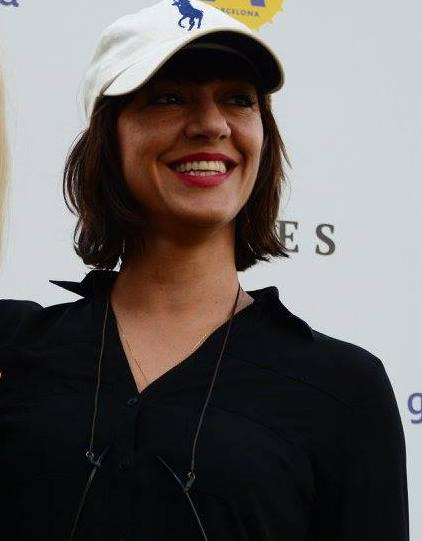
Ana Lily Amirpour

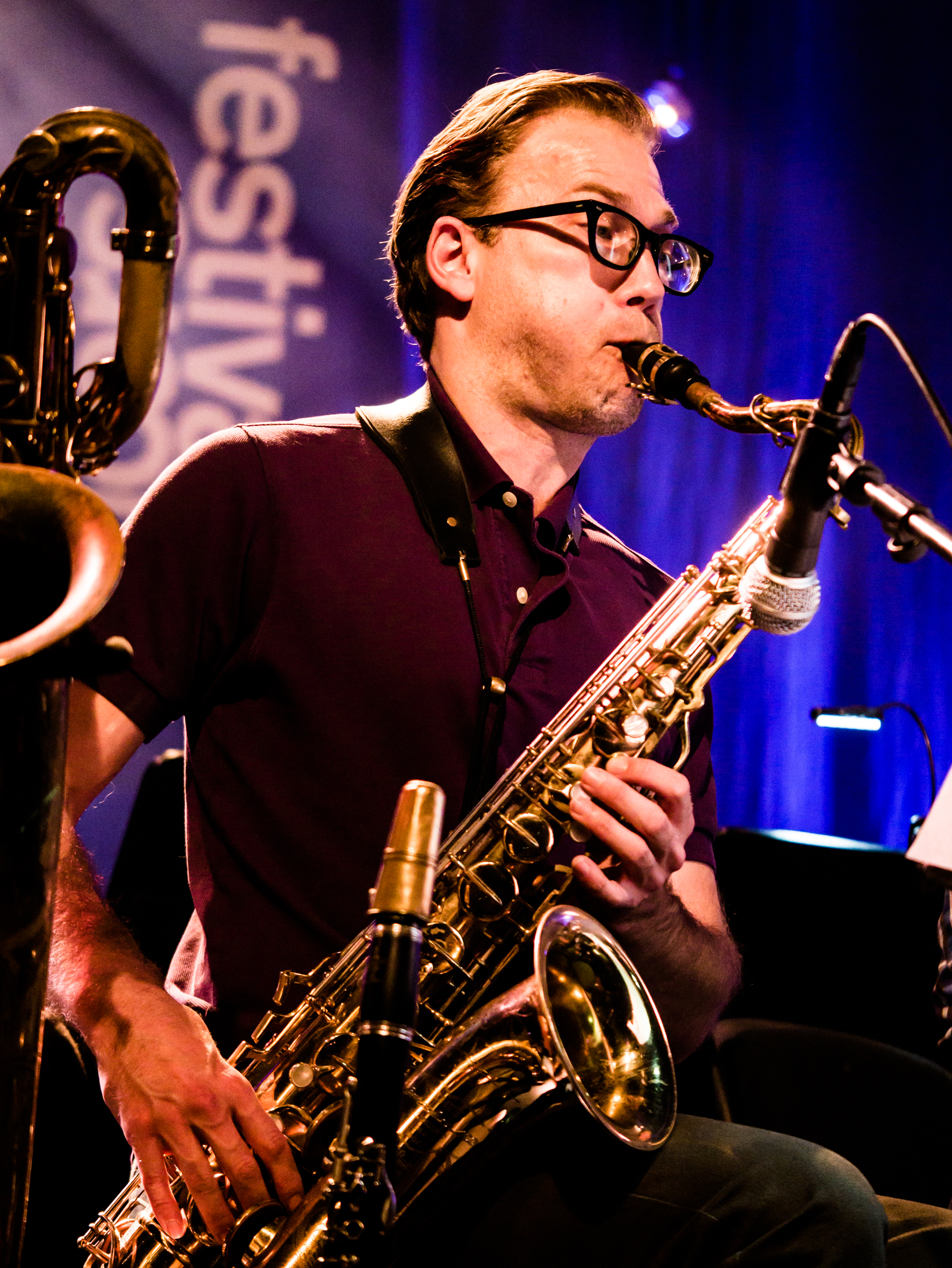
Matt Bauder

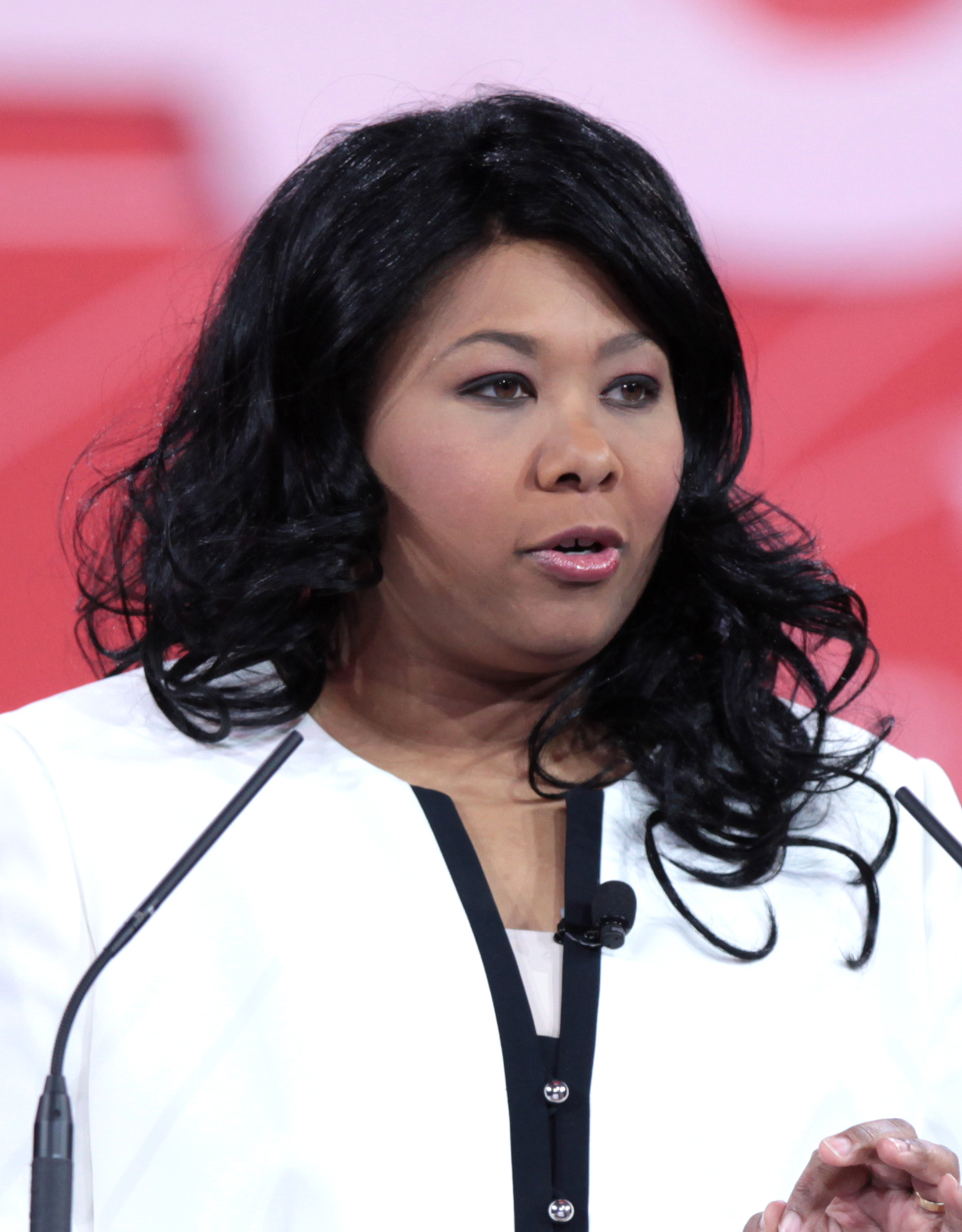
Jamila Bey

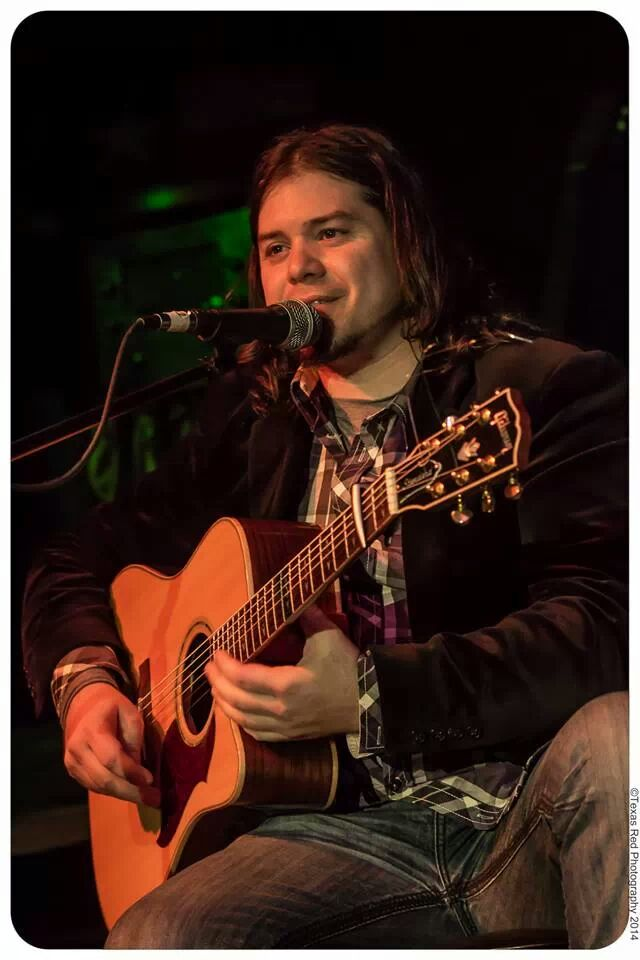
Jesse Brand

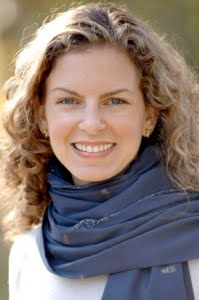
Sara Bronfman

- Hassan Abujihaad, U.S. Navy sailor convicted of terrorism
- Golnar Adili, artist
- Farooque Ahmed, convicted terrorist
- Marc Alessi, politician
- Kimberly Amato, actress and author
- Ana Lily Amirpour, British-born director, screenwriter, producer, and actress
- Ampichino, rapper and producer
- Ning An, Chinese-born pianist
- Angelina, singer
- Sarah Aroeste, singer and composer
- Huwaida Arraf, activist and lawyer
- Elena Bajo, Spanish-born visual artist
- Mishell Baker, writer
- Benjamin Balint, author, journalist, educator, and translator
- Simon Ball, ballet dancer
- Ali Banisadr, Iranian-born artist
- Mahmoud Reza Banki, Iranian-born scientist
- Michael Baskette, music producer
- Orca Bates, model
- Matt Bauder, jazz musician
- Naomi Beckwith, art curator
- T. James Belich, playwright and actor
- Frank Benson, artist
- Mickey Bergman, Vice President and executive director of the Richardson Center for Global Engagement
- Josh Berk, author
- Leah Berman, mathematician
- Jamila Bey, journalist
- Jay Black, comedian
- Libby Black, artist
- Brad Boatright, musician, record producer, and mastering engineer
- Jeff Bourne, politician
- James Brand, musician (d. 2010)
- Jennie E. Brand, sociologist and social statistician
- Jesse Brand, songwriter, musician, and actor
- Ivan Brandon, comic book writer
- Ryan Brasseaux, folklorist
- Joey Brinson, wheelchair fencer
- Sara Bronfman, daughter of Edgar Bronfman Sr., and member of NXIVM
- Amanda Browder, installation artist
- Josh Brown, singer and frontman for Day of Fire
- John Bunn, wrongfully convicted man
- Victoria Burge, artist
- Dillon Burroughs, author
- Kent Bye, podcaster and journalist
- Vasili Byros, musicologist
- Tonantzin Carmelo, actress
- Loomis Fall, songwriter, multi-instrumentalist musician, actor, and stunt performer
- Sarah Schechter, producer, co-founder of Berlanti-Schechter Films

== Deaths ==
- January 10 – Howlin' Wolf, blues musician (born 1910)
- January 15 – Jim Graner, sports anchor (born 1919)
- January 21 – John Gould Moyer, naval officer, 31st Governor of American Samoa (born 1893)
- January 23 – Paul Robeson, bass baritone (born 1898)
- January 31 – Ernesto Miranda, defendant in Miranda v. Arizona (born 1941)
- February 1
  - Leland H. Jenks, economic historian (born 1892)
  - George Whipple, scientist, recipient of the Nobel Prize in Physiology or Medicine (born 1878)
- February 6 – Vince Guaraldi, jazz pianist (born 1928)
- February 9 – Percy Faith, Canadian-American bandleader, orchestrator, composer, and conductor (born 1908)
- February 11
  - Lee J. Cobb, actor (born 1911)
  - John H. Hester, general (born 1886)
  - John Twist, screenwriter (born 1898)
- February 12 – Sal Mineo, film actor (born 1939)
- February 13 – Lily Pons, operatic soprano (born 1898 in France)
- February 22 – Florence Ballard, singer (The Supremes) (born 1943)
- February 26 – Joseph Weil, con man (born 1875)
- March 14 – Busby Berkeley, film director and musical choreographer (born 1895)
- March 15 – Jo Mielziner, set and lighting designer (born 1901 in France)
- March 17 – Andrew Tombes, comedian and character actor (born 1885)
- March 25 – Josef Albers, Modernist painter (born 1888 in Germany)
- April 2 – Ray Teal, actor (born 1902)
- April 4 – Harry Nyquist, information theory pioneer (born 1889 in Sweden)
- April 5 – Howard Hughes, aviation pioneer, film director and millionaire recluse (born 1905)
- April 7 – Mary Margaret McBride, writer and radio host (born 1899)
- April 9
  - Margaret Brundage, illustrator (born 1900)
  - Dagmar Nordstrom, composer and pianist (born 1903)
  - Phil Ochs, protest singer-songwriter (born 1940)
- April 12 – Paul Ford, actor (born 1901)
- April 14
  - William H. Hastie, judge and politician (born 1904)
  - Maudie Prickett, actress (born 1914)
- May 22 – Oscar Bonavena, Argentine boxer (born 1942)
- May 24 – Bobby Barber, actor (born 1894)
- May 31 – Martha Mitchell, Watergate whistleblower and wife of John N. Mitchell (born 1918)
- June 6 died in UK– J. Paul Getty, industrialist (born 1892)
- June 10 – Adolph Zukor, Hungarian-American film producer (born 1873)
- June 20 – Lou Klein, baseball player and coach (born 1918)
- June 25 – Johnny Mercer, lyricist, songwriter, singer, and record label executive (born 1909)
- July 12 – Ted Mack, broadcaster, host, and musician (born 1904)
- August 2 – Fritz Lang, Austrian-American-German director, screenwriter, and producer (born 1890)
- August 11 – Omer Poos, United States district judge from 1958 to 1976 (born 1902)
- August 17 – William Redfield, actor (born 1927)
- August 26 – Lotte Lehmann, soprano (born 1888 in Germany)
- August 28 – Anissa Jones, TV actress (born 1958)
- September 10 – Dalton Trumbo, screenwriter and novelist (born 1905)
- September 27 – Marion B. Folsom, government official and businessman (born 1893)
- October 9 – Bob Moose, baseball player (born 1947)
- October 15 – Carlo Gambino, mafioso (born 1902 in Italy)
- November 9 – Billy Halop, actor (born 1920)
- November 11 – Alexander Calder, sculptor (born 1898)
- November 18 – Man Ray, artist (born 1890)
- November 21 – Walter Stuart Diehl, naval officer and aeronautical engineer (born 1893)
- November 28 – Rosalind Russell, film actress (born 1907)
- November 29 – Godfrey Cambridge, actor and comedian (born 1933)
- December 2 – Danny Murtaugh, baseball player and manager (born 1917)
- December 3 – Mary Nash, actress (born 1884)
- December 4 – Tommy Bolin, guitarist (born 1951)
- December 12 – Jack Cassidy, actor and singer (born 1927)
- December 13 – Geneve L. A. Shaffer, realtor, lecturer and author (born 1888)
- December 14 – Harry Snyder, Canadian-born businessman and co-founder of In-N-Out Burger (born 1913)
- December 20 – Richard J. Daley, mayor of Chicago (born 1902)
- December 25 – Frank R. Walker, admiral (born 1899).
- December 26 – Philip Hart, politician (born 1912)
- December 28
  - Katharine Byron, politician (born 1903)
  - Freddie King, blues guitarist, singer, and songwriter (born 1934)

== See also ==
- 1976 in American television
- List of American films of 1976
- Timeline of United States history (1970–1989)
