= KBAI (Washington) =

Radio station in Bellingham, Washington

Defunct
- Bellingham, Washington; United States
- Broadcast area: Whatcom County
- Frequency: 930 kHz
- Branding: 98.9 K-Bay

Programming
- Format: Defunct (formerly Classic hits)

Ownership
- Owner: Saga Communications; (Saga Broadcasting, LLC)
- Sister stations: KAFE, KGMI, KISM, KPUG

History
- First air date: 1958; 68 years ago (as KENY)
- Last air date: March 22, 2024
- Former call signs: KENY (1958–1968); KBFW (1968–1999); KIXT (1999–2001)
- Call sign meaning: sounds like "K-Bay"

Technical information
- Licensing authority: FCC
- Facility ID: 4633
- Class: B
- Power: 1,000 watts day; 500 watts night
- Transmitter coordinates: 48°47′52.4″N 122°28′5.6″W

Links
- Public license information: Public file; LMS
- Webcast: Listen Live
- Website: www.989kbay.com

KBAI (930 AM) was a radio station broadcasting a classic hits format. Licensed to Bellingham, Washington, the station served the Whatcom County area. The station was owned by Saga Communications, and operated as part of its Cascade Radio Group. It went silent on March 22, 2024.

KBAI was Class B AM station, powered at 1,000 watts by day and 500 watts at night. It was also heard on FM translator 98.9 K255DC in Bellingham. The translator continues to broadcast the classic hits format, fed from the HD3 digital subchannel of co-owned 92.9 KISM.

== History ==
The station first began broadcasting in 1958 as KENY, a daytime radio station. The call sign was changed to KBFW in 1968; the station would air a country music format for 30 years. The station became KIXT in 1999, when Saga Communications purchased it from Bellingham Broadcasting Corporation. In 2001, the station call sign was again changed to KBAI; after having remained a country station as KIXT, the format was changed first to Westwood One's adult standards programming, then to oldies.

On August 1, 2017, KBAI changed its format from progressive talk to classic hits, branded as "98.9 K-Bay"; the FM frequency was in reference to FM translator station K255DC (98.9 FM). Saga Communications requested the cancellation of the KBAI license on March 22, 2024; the "K-Bay" programming was moved to the third HD Radio channel of KISM while remaining on K255DC.

The Federal Communications Commission cancelled the station’s license on March 28, 2024.
