= Doug Ericksen =

American politician (1969–2021)

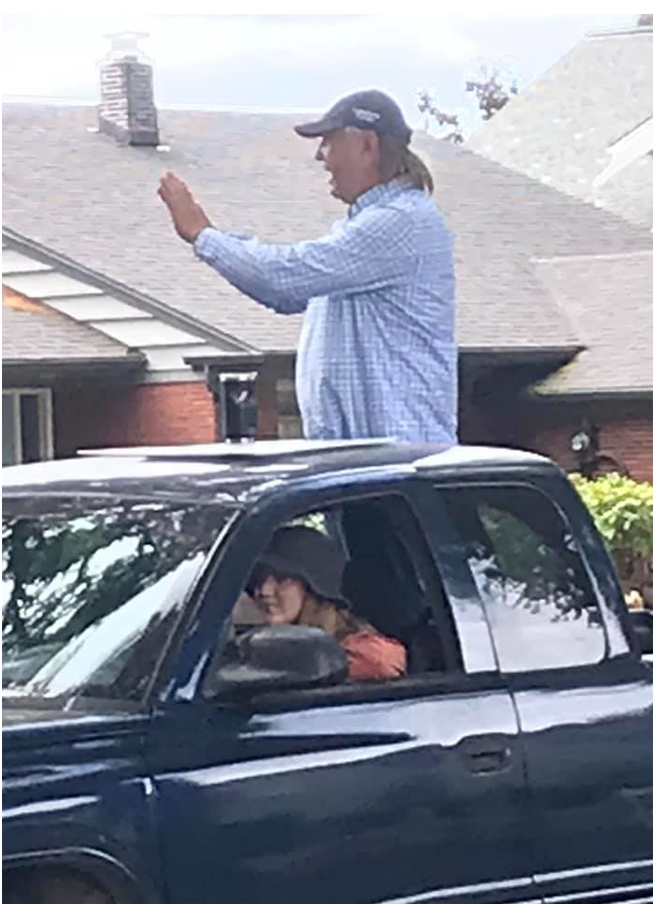
- Ericksen in July 2021

Member of the Washington Senate from the 42nd district
- In office January 10, 2011 – December 17, 2021
- Preceded by: Dale Brandland
- Succeeded by: Simon Sefzik

Member of the Washington House of Representatives from the 42nd district
- In office January 11, 1999 – January 10, 2011
- Preceded by: Georgia Anne Gardner
- Succeeded by: Jason Overstreet

Personal details
- Born: Douglas John Ericksen; January 28, 1969 Bellingham, Washington, U.S.
- Died: December 17, 2021 (aged 52) Fort Lauderdale, Florida, U.S.
- Party: Republican
- Spouse: Tasha Ericksen
- Children: 2
- Education: Cornell University (BA); Western Washington University (MA)
- Awards: Herman Cain Award
- Website: Official

Douglas John Ericksen (January 28, 1969 – December 17, 2021) was an American politician and lobbyist who served as a member of the Washington State Senate, representing the 42nd district from 2011 to 2021. Ericksen was the ranking member of the body's Energy, Environment, and Telecommunications Committee. In April 2019, he registered as a foreign agent to consult and lobby for Hun Sen, Prime Minister of Cambodia.

== Early life and education ==
Ericksen was born and raised in Bellingham, Washington, and graduated from Sehome High School in 1987. He earned a Bachelor of Arts degree in government from Cornell University and a Master of Arts in political science and environmental policy from Western Washington University.

== Career ==
Ericksen began his political career working for Washington State Senator Ann Anderson, 42nd Legislative District, while he was attending Western Washington University. In 1998, he accepted a position with the Washington State Department of Fish and Wildlife as a Legislative Affairs Coordinator. He left his position with the Department of Fish and Wildlife in 1998 to run for the Washington State House of Representatives. After serving six terms in the House, Ericksen was elected to the Washington State Senate in 2010.

As ranking member of the Senate Environment, Energy & Technology Committee, Ericksen opposed bills to reduce greenhouse gas emissions.

In November 2016, following protests against Donald Trump and fracking, Ericksen authored a bill that would treat some common protest actions, such as blocking traffic and rail lines, as economic terrorism and allow for felony prosecution of individuals who take part in such action. At that time, Ericksen said to reporters: "I completely support your First Amendment right to protest, [but] you do not have the First Amendment right to block a train."

In January 2017, Ericksen accepted the temporary position of interim director of communications with the United States Environmental Protection Agency, but stated he would not resign from his senate seat. He was named Senior Advisor to the Regional Administrator for Public Engagement but declined to take the job over commuting concerns and his position as senator.

Ericksen was narrowly reelected in 2018, receiving 49.9% of the 72,779 votes cast.

In November 2020, Ericksen proposed legislation to eliminate the voting by mail system used by the state for years and change other voting measures, citing unsubstantiated concerns about "election security". Ericksen claimed that the bill was necessary and falsely claimed that there was widespread voter fraud in the state's 2020 election.

In 2021, Ericksen was primary sponsor for a bill "Protecting the right of every Washington resident to decline an immunization or vaccination for COVID-19." Ericksen had also voiced opposition toward state measures aiming to reduce the spread of COVID-19, such as masking, social distancing, and vaccine mandates.

=== Lobbying ===
In May 2013, the Associated Press reported that Ericksen was "the biggest beneficiary of lobbyist expense accounts" among Washington state legislators during the first four months of 2013, receiving free meals, drinks or golf 62 times in that period. Ericksen said his meetings with lobbyists allow him to learn about issues, and argued that "A $49 dinner is not going to sway me from doing what's right for my constituents."

In May 2018 Ericksen joined fellow state senator Michael Baumgartner, Representative Vincent Buys, and football coach Mike Leach on a trip to Cambodia. He returned in July with Representatives Buys, Drew MacEwen, and Brandon Vick to observe the 2018 Cambodian general election, though MacEwen and Vick departed after the U.S. Ambassador expressed concerns about the election, which was widely called a "sham". He met with Cambodia's authoritarian prime minister Hun Sen and later called the election "very free, very fair", saying the opposition party's elimination was a "political question". Ericksen's actions were condemned by Governor Jay Inslee and the NGO Human Rights Watch, which said of the delegation, "they hold in contempt the principles of free and fair elections, an independent media, and a neutral election administration—because all those things are lacking in Hun Sen's Cambodia." In a meeting with Sen at the United Nations in September, he called for allowing a search for MIA Vietnam War soldiers.

Ericksen visited Prime Minister Hun Sen again in Phnom Penh in March 2019, where he stated his belief the 2018 Cambodian general election was "free, just and non-violent", as quoted by Cambodian media that inflated his position as "US Senator". Cambodia's elections were widely criticized by human rights groups and international observers, and the White House said they were "neither free nor fair and failed to represent the will of the Cambodian people". Some of Ericksen's travel was paid for by campaign funds, which state law requires to be used for official responsibilities.

In April 2019, Ericksen registered as a foreign lobbyist for the Cambodian government; his consulting company, co-owned with former state representative Jay Rodne, will be paid US$500,000 a year to arrange official visits between the countries and business leaders. They are the only registered Cambodian agents besides a major lobbying firm in Washington, D.C. The move was criticized by Republican U.S. Rep. Ted Yoho, who sought to sanction Cambodia's "brutal dictatorship".

In February 2021, Ericksen missed legislative votes to act as a monitor for the 2021 Salvadoran legislative election, which strengthened the position of El Salvador's authoritarian president's party. He praised the country's "large military and police presence" at polling places as "reassuring".

== Personal life and death ==
Ericksen and his wife, Tasha, had two daughters, Addi and Elsa, and lived in Ferndale, Washington. Tasha is a high school teacher.

In November 2021, Ericksen tested positive for COVID-19 shortly after arriving in El Salvador. Unable to get back to the United States, Ericksen emailed Republican colleagues to help send him monoclonal antibodies (a treatment for COVID-19) as they were reportedly not available in El Salvador. Although it was initially reported that Ericksen was medically evacuated via helicopter to Fort Lauderdale, Florida, to continue treatment, the senator had not been heard from publicly since his request for the antibody treatment. Ericksen died on December 17, 2021, at the age of 52.
