= Simon Sefzik =

American politician from Washington

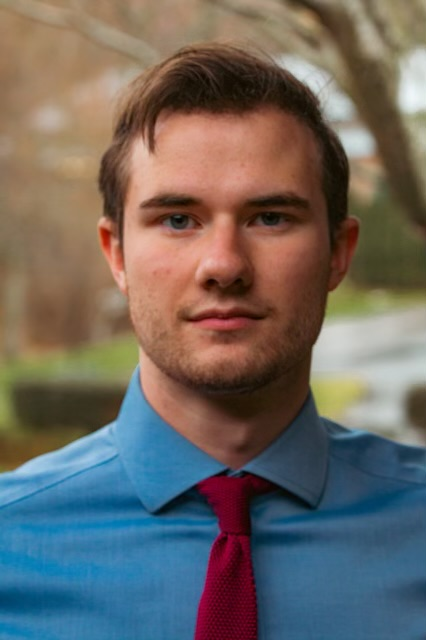

Member of the Washington Senate from the 42nd district
- In office January 11, 2022 – December 9, 2022
- Preceded by: Doug Ericksen
- Succeeded by: Sharon Shewmake

Personal details
- Born: December 21, 1999 (age 26) Ferndale, Washington, U.S.
- Party: Republican
- Education: Patrick Henry College (BA) University of Virginia School of Law (JD)

Simon A. Sefzik (born December 21, 1999) is an American politician of the Republican Party who served as a member of the Washington State Senate from the 42nd district. He served in office from January 11, 2022 to December 9, 2022.

== Early life and education ==
Sefzik was born in Ferndale, Washington. He graduated summa cum laude with Highest Honors from Patrick Henry College, earning a Bachelor of Arts in Government with a concentration in American Politics and Policy. Prior to attending Patrick Henry College, Sefzik was a four-time national high school forensics champion. While in college, he competed for the moot court team at Patrick Henry.

== Career ==
A member of the Republican Party, Sefzik served as an intern in the office of Congressman Ted Budd and in the White House Office during the first Trump Administration. Sefzik was a staffer in the Executive Office of the President.

On January 11, 2022, after the death of Washington state Senator Doug Ericksen, Sefzik was selected by the Whatcom County Council to finish Senator Ericksen's term. With his appointment at age 22, Sefzik became the youngest member of the Washington State Senate.

In the Washington Senate, Sefzik was a member of the Higher Education & Workforce Development Committee, the Health & Long Term Care Committee, and the Housing & Local Government Committee. Sefzik's policy focus areas included agriculture, affordability, fiscal responsibility, public safety, and flood relief for Whatcom Country residents.

Sefzik's candidacy was endorsed by the Washington Council of Police and Sheriffs, Washington Fraternal Order of Police, Washington Food Industry Association, Washington Hospitality Association, Whatcom County Association of Realtors, Inland Pacific Associated Builders and Contractors, Building Industry Association of Washington, Washington State Young Republicans, Laborers Local 292, Operating Engineers 302, Associated General Contractors of Washington Build PAC, Washington National Federation of Independent Business, Washington Hunters Heritage Council, Association of Washington Business, Washington State Farm Bureau PAC, and the Washington Retail Association.

On February 9, 2022, Sefzik announced his intent to retain the seat in the 2022 election. He advanced from the top-two primary with 33.2% of the vote, finishing second among three candidates. In the general election, Sefzik lost to Democratic State Representative Sharon Shewmake by 0.8%.
