= Pete Kremen =

American radio broadcaster and politician from Washington

Member of the Whatcom County Council from the 1st district
- In office January 1, 2012 – January 1, 2016
- Preceded by: Tony Larson
- Succeeded by: Todd Donovan

3rd Whatcom County Executive
- In office January 1, 1996 – January 1, 2012
- Preceded by: Shirley Van Zanten
- Succeeded by: Jack Louws

Member of the Washington House of Representatives from the 42nd district
- In office January 14, 1985 – December 9, 1995
- Preceded by: Roger Van Dyken
- Succeeded by: Kelli Linville

Personal details
- Party: Democratic
- Spouse: Fidela Kremen
- Occupation: Radio broadcaster, Politician

Pete Kremen is an American politician of the Democratic Party. He served for 12 years as a member of the Washington House of Representatives, representing the 42nd district, then served for 16 years as the Whatcom County Executive, the county's highest elected official, and the longest tenure for any county executive in state history. He finished his career with one term as a member of the Whatcom County Council before retiring in 2015. Before his political career, Kremen was the Director of News & Public Affairs at radio station KPUG.
