= Kelli Linville =

American politician from Washington

Mayor of Bellingham
- In office January 1, 2012 – January 1, 2020
- Preceded by: Dan Pike
- Succeeded by: Seth Fleetwood

Member of the Washington House of Representatives from the 42nd district
- In office December 12, 1995 – January 10, 2011
- Preceded by: Pete Kremen
- Succeeded by: Vincent Buys
- In office January 11, 1993 – January 9, 1995
- Preceded by: Dennis Braddock
- Succeeded by: Gene Goldsmith

Personal details
- Born: 1948 (age 77–78) Bellingham, Washington, U.S.
- Party: Democratic
- Education: Western Washington University (BS, MS)

Kelli J. Linville (born 1948) is an American politician who served as the mayor of Bellingham, Washington from 2011 to 2020. Prior to her election as mayor, Linville was a member of the Washington House of Representatives, representing the 42nd Legislative District, where she served Chair of the House Ways and Means Committee.

== Education ==
Linville was born and raised in Bellingham, Washington. She graduated from Bellingham High School in 1966 and holds a bachelor's and master's degree in speech-language pathology from Western Washington University. She worked for 16 years as a speech pathologist in the Bellingham School District.

== Career ==
A Democrat, Linville was elected to the Washington House of Representatives in 1992 and served one term before losing reelection. In 1995, she was appointed to fill a vacant seat. She was reelected every two years from 1996 to 2008. In November 2010, Linville was narrowly defeated for re-election by Vincent Buys.

In November 2011, Linville was elected mayor of Bellingham over incumbent Dan Pike. She was reelected in 2015, and announced she would not seek a third term in 2019. Linville was succeeded by Seth Fleetwood in 2020.

== See also ==
- List of mayors of Bellingham, Washington
