= Endgame (TV series) =

Canadian television series

- Genre: Drama; Mystery; Crime
- Created by: Avrum Jacobson
- Directed by: David Frazee
- Starring: Shawn Doyle; Torrance Coombs; Patrick Gallagher; Katharine Isabelle; Melanie Papalia; Carmen Aguirre; Veena Sood
- Country of origin: Canada
- Original language: English
- No. of seasons: 1
- No. of episodes: 13

Production
- Executive producers: Michael Shepard; Tim Gamble; Harvey Kahn
- Production locations: Vancouver, British Columbia, Canada
- Running time: 45 minutes
- Production companies: Thunderbird Films; Front Street Pictures; Shaw Media

Original release
- Network: Showcase
- Release: March 14 – June 13, 2011

Endgame (stylized as ENDGAMƎ) is a Canadian drama television series that premiered on the Showcase Television network on Monday, March 14, 2011. The series was developed and produced by Thunderbird Films. The series followed fictional former World Chess Champion Arkady Balagan (Shawn Doyle), a genius who uses his analytical skills to solve crimes.

The show starts four months after the death of Balagan's fiancée Rosemary, when Balagan has developed agoraphobia. Balagan uses the faculties he honed playing chess to help him solve cases.

== Cast and characters ==
- Shawn Doyle as Arkady Balagan – a former world chess champion from Russia. While attending a world championship in Vancouver his fiancée, Rosemary, is killed by an assassin's gunfire in front of the hotel Huxley. His resultant agoraphobia makes him an "armchair detective" like Nero Wolfe or Lincoln Rhyme. Initially, he primarily makes money by charging exorbitant rates for games against "Grandmaster Arkady Balagan" on his website.
- Torrance Coombs as Sam Besht – a grad student and chess fanatic. He is Balagan's apprentice; because of Balagan's phobia Sam is the one who does the leg work to solve the cases. Sam is a smart kid with a promising future; Balagan pays Sam for his legwork by giving him more chances to play chess with Balagan.
- Patrick Gallagher as Hugo – the head of hotel security. He and Balagan have their disagreements; Hugo envies Balagan's superior capabilities solving crimes as a mere chess player while he, as a former detective, shows a lower aptitude at deduction. Hugo constantly threatens Balagan about his inability to pay his bills, and wants him to leave. Balagan deceives and outwits Hugo into helping him or staying out of his way.
- Katharine Isabelle as Danni – a bartender at the hotel. Danni serves as a source of information.
- Melanie Papalia as Pippa – younger sister of Rosemary (Balagan's deceased fiancée), she is determined to find out who killed Rosemary. She makes documentaries and keeps a video blog.
- Carmen Aguirre as Alcina – a cleaning lady at the Huxley Hotel. She is a single mother of six, with one grandchild, who works overtime, practically every day. She sometimes skips work time in order to do some field work with Sam, as a favour to Mr. Balagan, who tips generously.
- Veena Sood as Barbara Stilwell – the manager of the hotel. Barbara does not help with Balagan's cases.
- Collin Lawrence – as Homicide Detective Jason Evans (recurring), the newest detective assigned by the police to investigate the murder of Pippa's older sister Rosemary (Balagan's late fiancée). Pippa has confidence in the detective, and that his fresh perspective on the case will enable him to solve the mystery of who murdered Rosemary. Balagan, in sharp contrast, has much less faith in the police, based on his experiences in the Soviet Union with alleged corruption and incompetence.

== Episodes ==
No.	Title	Directed by	Written by	Original release date	CAN viewers (millions)
1	"Opening Moves"	David Frazee	Avrum Jacobson	March 14, 2011	0.232
Balagan's first case is launched when Danni pleads with him to find a missing boy and, in a race against time, he enlists Sam and Alcina to help.
2	"Turkish Hold'em"	David Frazee	Avrum Jacobson	March 21, 2011	0.154
A clever robbery during a high-stakes poker game forces Hugo to ask Balagan for help, prompting the chess master to create his own complex plot to trap the culprit.
3	"The Caffeine Hit"	Anne Wheeler	Jeremy Boxen	March 28, 2011	0.106
Hired by a desperate amnesiac, Balagan begins to unravel the man's complicated identity while fighting with Pippa over the investigation into his fiancée's murder.
4	"The Other Side of Summer"	Anne Wheeler	Sarah Dodd	April 4, 2011	0.179
In order to help his former mentor on the police force, Hugo is forced to ask Balagan for help in solving a baffling, old cold case about a missing teenage girl.
5	"I Killed Her"	James Head	Avrum Jacobson	April 11, 2011	N/A
A mysterious doctor tells Balagan that he is responsible for the murder of a woman found in the hotel pool during a psychiatric conference, drawing Balagan into a complex and dangerous game that reveals the truth about a murder.
6	"Fearful Symmetry"	David Frazee	Steve Cochrane	April 18, 2011	0.075
Enlisted by a terrified family to help solve the inexplicable bombing of their car, which leaves their son too terrified to leave the house, Balagan is sidetracked by an unexpected match with a 16-year-old world chess champion.
7	"Gorillas in Our Midst"	Rachel Talalay	Katherine Collins & Avrum Jacobson	April 25, 2011	0.128
Smitten by a beautiful Chinese cryptologist, Sam convinces Balagan to try to solve an intricate puzzle involving a vital secret and an attractive, conniving female journalist.
8	"The White Queen"	Charles Binamé	Jeremy Boxen	May 2, 2011	0.103
When the imperious heiress of the Huxley Hotel empire descends for an inspection, she coerces Balagan into helping her find her son, who has mysteriously disappeared.
9	"Huxley, We Have a Problem"	Anne Wheeler	Graeme Manson	May 9, 2011	0.122
A boisterous reunion between Balagan and his longtime buddy, a Russian cosmonaut, is interrupted when an aerospace engineer plunges to his death and Balagan's friend is accused of the murder, leaving Balagan questioning his friend's innocence.
10	"Bless This Union"	David Frazee	Kate Miles Melville	May 16, 2011	0.094
When the hotel safe is robbed during an extravagant Indian wedding celebration, the distraught couple asks Balagan to help recover their stolen gifts -- but is it an inside job or the work of professionals?
11	"Mr. Black"	David Frazee	Jeremy Boxen	May 30, 2011	N/A
Balagan is forced to match his chess skills against a computer when his anonymous online opponent reveals that he is playing for lethally high stakes – the lives of a group of innocent hostages.
12	"Polar Opposites"	Kari Skogland	Katherine Collins	June 6, 2011	N/A
An entitled rock star hires Balagan to find $200,000 stolen from him – a mystery that also involves colourful groupies, a missing polar bear, and the kidnapped grandmother of Danni's estranged husband.
13	"Deadman Talking"	David Frazee	Avrum Jacobson	June 13, 2011	N/A
After Balagan investigates the sudden death of a hotel security guard, he is forced to face his worst nightmare. Ends in cliffhanger.

== Cancellation ==
In early June 2011 Showcase announced that it would not renew Endgame for a second season. In February 2012, it was reported that Shawn Doyle had been contracted for a possible return of the series, pending continued success of its Hulu premiere. In June 2012, it was announced that the show would not be continued.

== Distribution ==
The series is available through streaming services Amazon Video and Hulu. It is also available in the free with ads section of Vudu.
