= Nunamaker =

Nunamaker is a surname. Notable people with the surname include:

- Homer Nunamaker (1889–1964), American politician
- Jay Nunamaker (born 1937), American academic
- Julian Nunamaker (1946–1995), American football player
- Les Nunamaker (1889–1938), American baseball player
