= KNWR =

KNWR may refer to:

- KNWR (FM), radio station (90.7 FM) in Ellensburg, Washington
- KAFE, a radio station (104.1 FM) in Bellingham, Washington, which held the call sign KNWR from 1979 to 1989
- Kenai National Wildlife Refuge, a wildlife habitat preserve in Alaska
