= Binzer =

Binzer is a surname. Notable people with the surname include:

- August Daniel von Binzer (1793–1868), German poet and journalist
- Harry A. Binzer (1897–1959), member of the Washington State Senate
- Joseph R. Binzer (born 1955), American Catholic prelate
- Shifty Shellshock (real name Seth Binzer; 1974–2024), American rapper and singer-songwriter
