= 2012 NAPA Auto Parts 200 =

Auto race run at Circuit Gilles Villeneuve in 2012

Coordinates: 45°30′2.08″N 73°31′20.86″W

Race details
- Race 22 of 33 in the 2012 NASCAR Nationwide Series season
- Date: August 18, 2012
- Official name: NAPA Auto Parts 200
- Location: Circuit Gilles Villeneuve, Montreal, Quebec, Canada
- Course: Permanent racing facility
- Course length: 2.709 miles (4.360 km)
- Distance: 81 laps, 219.429 mi (353.137 km)
- Scheduled distance: 74 laps, 200.466 mi (322.619 km)
- Weather: Mild with temperatures of 25.2 °C (77.4 °F); wind speeds of 15 kilometres per hour (9.3 mph)
- Average speed: 70.043 mph (112.723 km/h)
- Attendance: 60,000

Pole position
Driver	Alex Tagliani	Turner Motorsports
- Time: 100.865 seconds

Most laps led
Driver	Jacques Villeneuve	Penske Racing
- Laps: 43

Winner
No. 31	Justin Allgaier	Turner Motorsports

Television in the United States
- Network: ESPN
- Announcers: Marty Reid

The 2012 NAPA Auto Parts 200 (Note: Officially known in French as NAPA Pièces d'auto 200 présenté par Dodge) was the sixth running of the NAPA Auto Parts 200 race, a discontinued NASCAR Nationwide Series event that was held on August 18, 2012, at Circuit Gilles Villeneuve in Montreal, Quebec.

This was the final race ever held in Montreal for the NASCAR Nationwide Series and took place on a temporary road course. The scheduled total distance of the racing event was 200.466 miles or 322.619 kilometres. However, NASCAR officials decided to lengthen this race in an attempt to implement two attempts at a green-white-checkered finish. Kyle Busch was the most favored driver at this racing event; with sports gambling websites giving him 5-to-2 odds for winning.

== Race report ==
More than 27% of this race was contested under a caution flag and green flags only lasted about seven laps on average. While accidents and debris were rare; cars were known to spin into hazardous conditions and the need for full-course cautions were given out alongside the "local" cautions usually found at events that are not considered to be oval tracks. While Alex Tagliani and Sam Hornish Jr. were the main competitors for the lead in the first seven laps of the race, the final 54 laps of the race would be a five-way struggle to win the race. Notable drivers like Jacques Villeneuve, Elliott Sadler, Alex Tagliani and Justin Allgaier would be the drivers to beat. Daryl Harr ended up scoring his best career finish and only lead lap finish at this race.

After three hours and seven minutes of racing, Justin Allgaier defeated Sam Hornish Jr. by nearly four-thousandths of a second in front of a live audience of sixty thousand people. The pre-race ceremonies began at 2:00 PM Eastern Daylight Saving Time with the invocation in both of Canada's official languages along with the national anthems of Canada (O Canada in a mixture of French and English) and the United States of America (a completely English version of The Star-Spangled Banner). Actual racing began at approximately 2:49 PM Eastern Daylight Saving Time and ended at approximately 5:56 PM EDT. Allgaier allegedly bumped a slower moving Jacques Villeneuve out of the way; extending his winless drought at this race track to 19 years. Villeneuve was running out of gas in the final lap of this racing event and would have needed luck to win the race. Villeneuve said when interviewed that he was not out of gas, but that Justin Allgaier won by shoving him around and said that he should have won the race; Allgaier showed no regrets afterwards, pointing out that Villeneuve had done a similar move on his Turner teammate Alex Tagliani to retake the lead. Danica Patrick was leading a good deal of laps and had a decent chance to win the race. A good finish wasn't in the cards, however, as someone threw a shoe on the track for some reason. Patrick hit the shoe, which came apart on impact, and the rogue footwear broke something under her car causing her to fall back and eventually have to pit for repairs, losing laps and any chance at even scoring a top-20 finish.

Jeff Green would be the last-place finisher due to a bad vibration in his vehicle on the second lap of this 81-lap race. Brian Scott, Michael Annett, and Patrick Carpentier were promising drivers that ended up finishing in the middle of the pack. Besides Allgaier and Hornish Jr., the other finishers in the "top ten" were Jacques Villeneuve, Elliott Sadler, Ron Fellows, Michael McDowell, Mike Wallace, Billy Johnson, Austin Dillon, and Kyle Busch. There were 43 drivers on the grid; Ryan Ellis was the only driver who didn't qualify for this race. His inadequate maximum speed of 90.309 miles per hour (145.338 km/h) would be relatively slow even when qualifying for a road course event. Competitors for this race came from three different countries including: Canada, the United States of America, and Australian-born Kenny Habul. Chris Cook switched from Sprint Cup Series to Nationwide (now Xfinity) Series points at this event; earning himself 5 points for qualifying for the race and finishing in 39th place.

Notable crew chiefs for this race were Tony Eury Jr. in addition to Tony Eury, Sr., Mike Beam, Jason Overstreet, Scott Zapadelli among others.

=== Qualifying ===
Grid	No.	Driver	Manufacturer	Qualifying time	Speed
1	30	Alex Tagliani	Chevrolet	100.865	96.688
2	12	Sam Hornish Jr.	Dodge	100.905	96.649
3	22	Jacques Villeneuve	Dodge	100.922	96.633
4	7	Danica Patrick	Chevrolet	101.409	96.169
5	54	Kyle Busch	Toyota	101.415	96.163
6	18	Michael McDowell	Toyota	101.725	95.870
7	88	Cole Whitt	Chevrolet	101.742	95.854
8	5	Ron Fellows	Chevrolet	101.769	95.829
9	60	Billy Johnson	Ford	101.999	95.613
10	11	Brian Scott	Ford	102.031	95.583

=== Prize summary ===
While last-place finisher Jeff Green walked away with an insignificant $19,392 in American dollars ($27,195 when adjusted for inflation), Justin Allgaier was justly rewarded for his victory by a payout bonus of $94,318 American dollars ($132,269 when adjusted for inflation).

== Timeline ==
Section reference:

- Start of race: Alex Tagliani had the pole position to begin the event.
- Lap 2: Vibration problems got the best of Jeff Green.
- Lap 3: Sam Hornish Jr. took over the lead from Alex Tagliani.
- Lap 4: Alex Tagliani took over the lead from Sam Hornish Jr.; Chase Miller noticed that his brakes no longer worked correctly.
- Lap 5: Blake Koch noticed that his brakes stopped working.
- Lap 6: Sam Hornish Jr. took over the lead from Alex Tagliani; Matt DiBenedetto had handling problems with his vehicle.
- Lap 8: Jacques Villeneuve took over the lead from Sam Hornish Jr..
- Lap 14: Louis-Philippe Dumoulin's vehicle suffered from suspension issues.
- Lap 15: Eric Curran's vehicle developed a faulty transmission.
- Lap 20: Sam Hornish Jr. took over the lead from Jacques Villeneuve.
- Lap 21: Danica Patrick took over the lead from Sam Hornish Jr.; Timmy Hill had to leave the race due to transmission issues.
- Lap 30: Dexter Stacy had a terminal crash.
- Lap 41: Jacques Villeneuve took over the lead from Danica Patrick.
- Lap 46: Elliott Sadler took over the lead from Jacques Villeneuve; Kenny Habul had a terminal crash.
- Lap 52: Jacques Villeneuve took over the lead from Elliott Sadler.
- Lap 54: Cole Whitt had to retire from the race due to engine concerns.
- Lap 57: Andrew Ranger noticed that his vehicle's suspension was acting strangely.
- Lap 59: The drive train of John Young's vehicle became problematic.
- Lap 62: Joe Nemechek's radiator started acting in a strange manner.
- Lap 64: Alex Tagliani took over the lead from Jacques Villeneuve.
- Lap 67: Jacques Villeneuve took over the lead from Alex Tagliani.
- Lap 77: Jason Bowles noticed that his brakes no longer worked properly.
- Lap 81: Justin Allgaier took over the lead from Jacques Villeneuve.
- Finish: Justin Allgaier finished the event as the winner.

== Standings after the race ==
Pos	Driver	Points	Differential
1	Elliott Sadler	824	0
2	Ricky Stenhouse Jr.	802	-22
2	Sam Hornish Jr.	802	-22
4	Austin Dillon	789	-35
5	Justin Allgaier	756	-68
6	Michael Annett	690	-134
7	Cole Whitt	633	-191
8	Mike Bliss	609	-215
9	Brian Scott	540	-284
10	Joe Nemechek	506	-318

== Notes ==
Preceded by 2012 Zippo 200 at the Glen	NASCAR Nationwide Series season 2012	Succeeded by 2012 Food City 250
Preceded by 2011	NAPA Auto Parts 200 races 2012	Succeeded by none
