= KBAI =

KBAI may refer to:

- KBAI (FM), a radio station (91.5 FM) licensed to Bloomfield, Missouri, United States
- KBAI (Washington), a radio station (930 AM) formerly licensed to Bellingham, Washington, United States, which used the call sign from 2001 to 2024
