= Sharon Shewmake =

American educator and politician from Washington

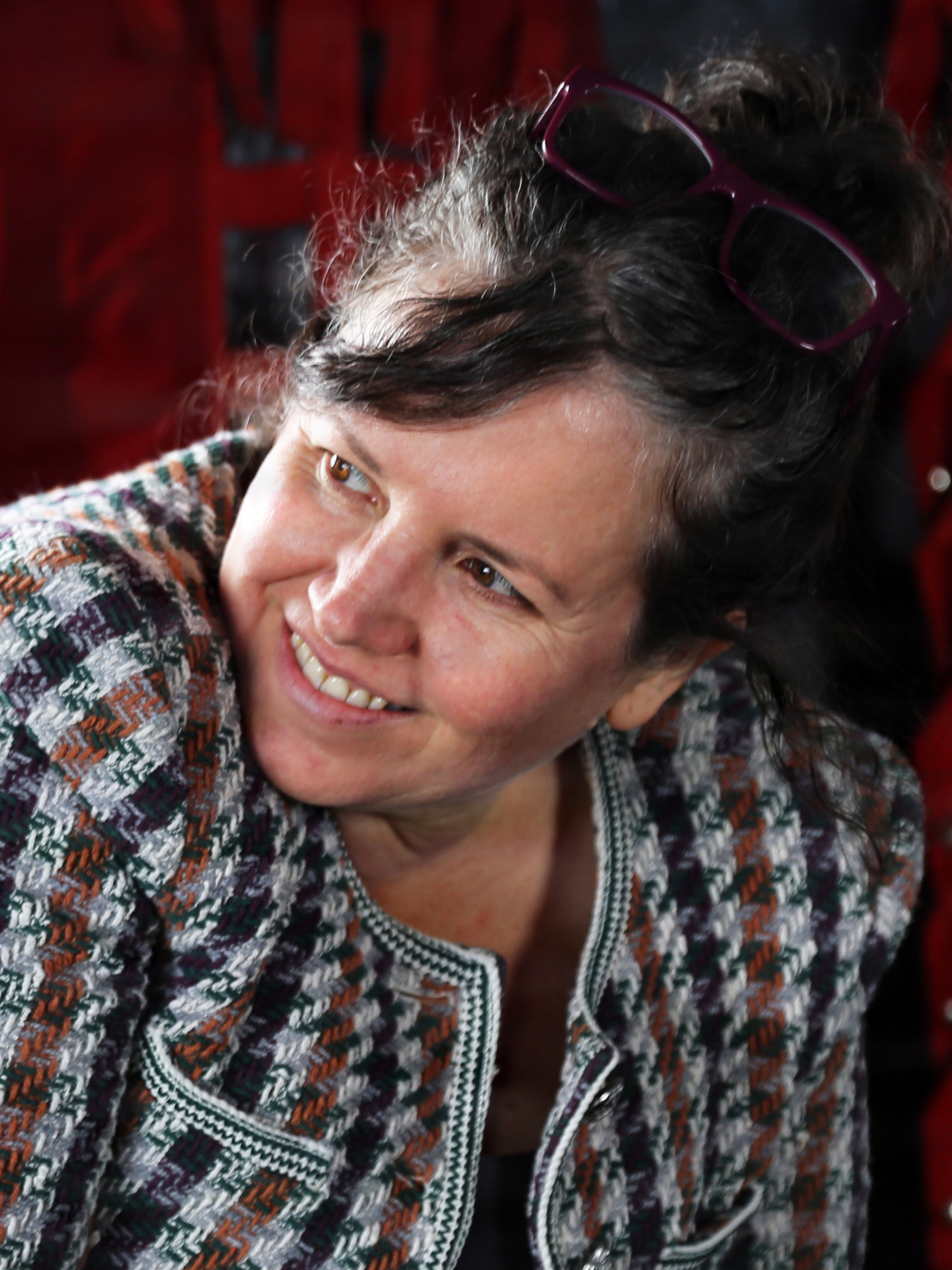
- Shewmake in 2026

Member of the Washington State Senate from the 42nd district
- Incumbent
- Assumed office December 9, 2022
- Preceded by: Simon Sefzik
- Succeeded by: Michael Shepard (elect)

Member of the Washington House of Representatives from the 42nd district
- In office January 14, 2019 – December 9, 2022
- Preceded by: Vincent Buys
- Succeeded by: Joe Timmons

Personal details
- Born: Sharon Anne Shewmake; May 19, 1980 (age 46) Sarasota, Florida, U.S.
- Party: Democratic
- Education: Duke University (BA); University of California, Davis (PhD)
- Profession: Professor of Economics
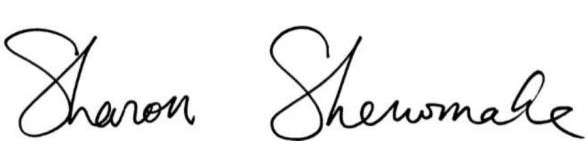
- Signature

Sharon Anne Shewmake (born May 19, 1980) is an American politician of the Democratic Party, and a professor of Economics and Energy Policy at Western Washington University in Bellingham, Washington. Shewmake represents the 42nd district in the Washington State Senate after serving two terms in the State House.

== Career ==
Shewmake holds a Ph.D. in Agricultural and Resource Economics from the University of California, Davis, and Bachelor's degrees in both Economics and in Environmental Science and Policy from Duke University.

Her academic work focuses on the economics of housing and transportation, the impacts of environmental policies, and microeconomics. Her publications have examined, among other subjects, the impacts of policies meant to reduce air pollution and congestion as well as how consumers respond to environmental labels, including labels for agricultural products.

== Political career ==
In the November 2018 general election, Shewmake defeated four-term incumbent Vincent Buys for State Representative (Pos. 2) by 981 votes. She took office in January 2019. In 2020, she won reelection, beating Republican Jennifer Sefzik by 3,134 votes.

Shewmake served on three committees in the State House. She serves as the Vice Chair of the Rural Development, Agriculture, and Natural Resources Committee and sits on the Energy and Environment Committee and the Transportation Committee.

Her political work is focused on bringing down the cost of childcare and removing barriers to access, improving the economics of energy and energy transparency, as well as service to the agriculture industry.

On November 19, 2021, Shewmake announced she was running to represent the 42nd district in the Washington Senate. Shewmake advanced to the general election with 47% of the vote in the blanket primary, opposing incumbent Republican Simon Sefzik, her former opponent Jennifer Sefzik’s son who was appointed to the position in January 2022 following the death of State Senator Doug Erickson. In the general election, Shewmake defeated Sefzik by over 800 votes. Shewmake was sworn in on December 9, 2022. and serves as Chair of the Energy, Environment and Technology Committee
