= Whatcom County Council =

Legislative body of Whatcom County, Washington, US

- Whatcom County, Washington

Type
- Type: County Council of the Whatcom County, WA

Leadership
- Chairperson: Kaylee Galloway (D)

Structure
- Seats: 7
- Political groups: Officially nonpartisan Democratic Party (5); Republican Party (2)
- Length of term: 4 years

Elections
- Last election: November 4, 2025
- Next election: November 2, 2027

Meeting place
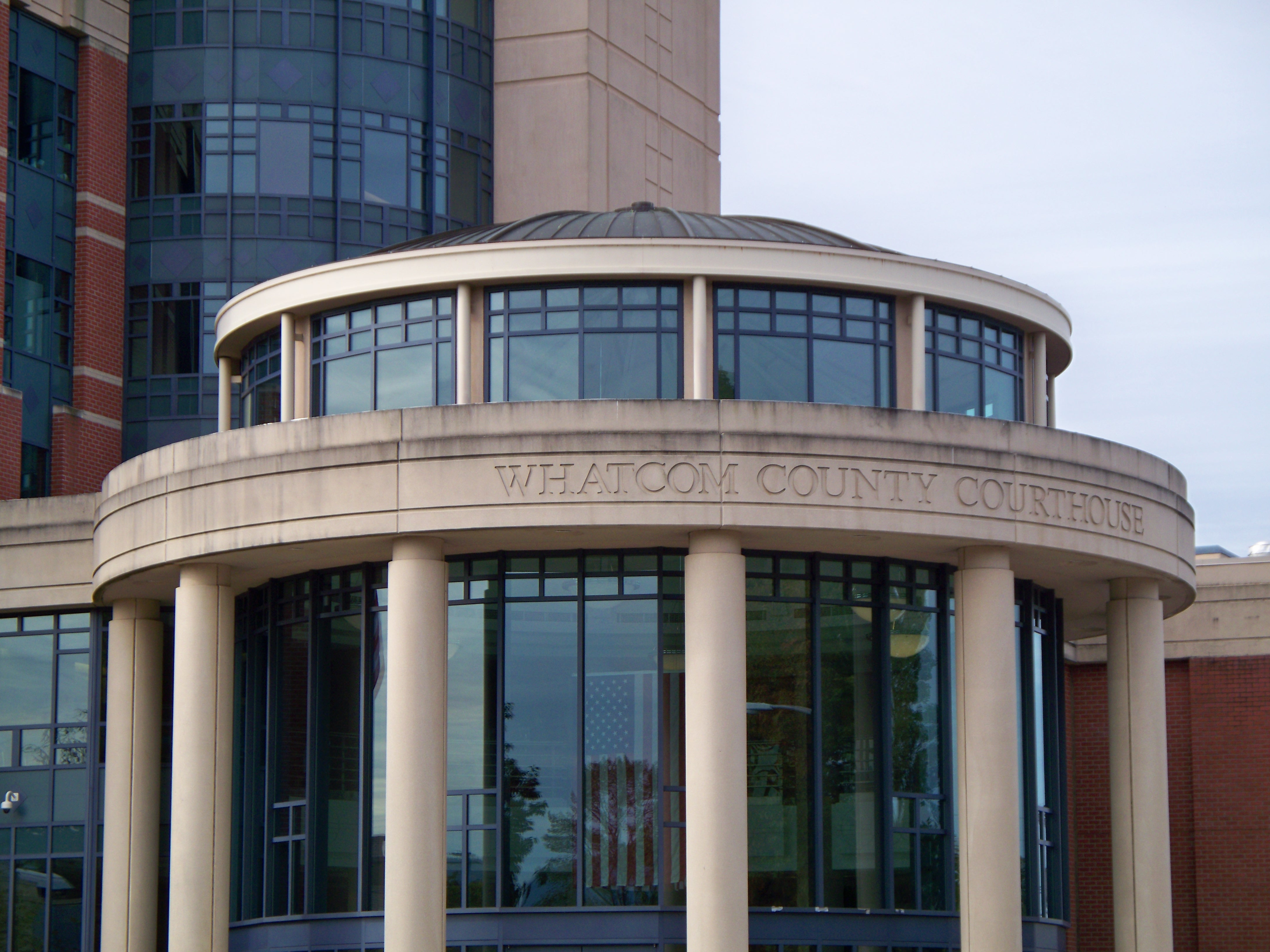
- Whatcom County Courthouse; 311 Grand Avenue; Bellingham, Washington 98225

Website
- Whatcom County Council

The Whatcom County Council, the legislative body of Whatcom County, Washington, consists of seven members, five elected by district and two elected at large. The Council adopts laws, sets policy, and holds final approval over the budget.

== Councilmembers ==
All elective offices on the Whatcom County Council are officially nonpartisan, however all are affiliated with a political party. The districts listed here are districts which each member was elected to.

District	Member	Party	First elected
District 1	Kaylee Galloway	Dem	2021
District 2	Elizabeth Boyle	Dem	2025
District 3	Jessica Rienstra	Dem	2025
District 4	Mark Stremler	Rep	2023
District 5	Ben Elenbaas	Rep	2019
At-large, Position A	Barry Buchanan	Dem	2013
At-large, Position B	Jon Scanlon	Dem	2023

== Meetings ==
The County Council meets biweekly at 7:00p.m. on every other Tuesday. Meetings are held in the County Council chambers on the first floor of the Whatcom County Courthouse located at 311 Grand Avenue in downtown Bellingham.

== Structure ==
Five Councilmembers are elected by district with an additional two at-large seats, and all are elected to four-year terms. Councilmembers in districts 1, 2, 3, and at-large seat A are up for election in the year following US presidential elections. Councilmembers in districts 4, 5, and at-large seat B are up for election in the year preceding US presidential elections. The Councilmembers elect a chair from among themselves.

The Whatcom County Executive is not a member of the council, and is a separately elected official. The Executive submits legislation to the council for consideration. The Executive has veto power over ordinances passed by the council. The Council requires a vote of five of the seven council members to override the Executive's veto.

County Council districts are redrawn in the year following the decennial US Census by a five-person redistricting commission using a similar model to the Washington State Redistricting Commission. The council appoints four redistricting commission members, two from each of the two major parties who then elect the fifth member who is also the chair. The redistricting commission has 30 days to appoint a Districting Master who must submit a plan to the commission by May 1st of a year ending in 1. The redistricting commission can amend the plan, but must approve the maps within 15 days.

== Charter Review ==
Whatcom County became a home rule county in 1978, governed by a county charter. Every 10 years during a year ending in 5, a Charter Review Commission is formed to review the charter and recommend charter amendments. All amendments must receive 10 out of 15 votes in favor to be put on the ballot by the commission. The public can also propose amendments to the Charter during any year by gathering signatures from at least 15% of the number of voters from the last gubernatorial election in the county. All amendments from the commission and the public are put on the ballot for the November general election and must receive a simple majority of votes to be approved. The most recent charter review was in 2025.

=== Charter Review Elections ===
Whatcom County holds elections in every year ending in 4 for members of the Charter Review Commission. Each County Council district elects 3 charter commissioners for a total of 15 commissioners. There is no primary election and all candidates are placed on the general election ballot. Voters can select up to three candidates and three candidates who receive the most votes in each council district are elected. They serve one-year terms and do not receive compensation.

=== Notable Charter Changes ===
Prior to 2015, the council was elected following three districts with two seats each, and one at large member. This changed upon the passage of Charter Amendment Proposition 9 by voters in 2015, which change the council from three districts to five. Also in 2015, the passage of Charter Amendment Proposition 1 changed the method of election in the general election from county-wide voting to district-only voting. Previously, primary elections for council seats were decided on by voters within each district, but the during the general election the entire county could vote on each race. Following 2015, only voters within each district get to vote for the candidates running for that district's seat. As before, the at-large seats are voted on by the entire county.

== Notable past council members ==
- Ken Mann, councilmember 2010–2018, co-host on Bellingham radio station KGMI.
- Carl Weimer, councilmember 2006–2018, former executive director of RE Sources for Sustainable Communities, a Bellingham-based non-profit environmental advocacy group.
- Pete Kremen, councilmember 2012–2016, Whatcom County Executive 1996–2012, Member of the Washington House of Representatives from the 42nd district 1985–1996.
