= Whatcom County Executive =

Overview of the executives of Whatcom County, Washington.

- Incumbent; Satpal Sidhu since January 1, 2020
- Appointer: Electorate; Whatcom County Council (unexpired terms)
- Term length: 4 years
- Inaugural holder: John Louws
- Formation: January 1, 1979
- Website: Whatcom County Executive

The Whatcom County Executive is the chief Executive Officer of Whatcom County government. The County Executive is a non partisan elected position, and may serve a four-year term in office, but no more than three consecutive full terms.(Whatcom County Home Rule Charter, Referendum November 3, 2015) 1)https://www.whatcomcounty.us/DocumentCenter/View/89614/01-20152016-CHARTER-Clean-Feb-2016-Full-Size?bidId=

== History ==
County voters approved the adoption of a home-rule charter for Whatcom County on November 7, 1978, creating the position of a seven-member county council. and the position of county executive. Prior to the adoption, the county government was led by three commissioners elected at-large.

== Duties ==
As Chief Executive Officer, the County Executive shall have all the executive powers of the County which are not expressly vested in other specific elective officers by the County Charter. Section 3.22 Powers and Duties articulates eight areas of duties administered by the Executive (https://www.whatcomcounty.us/DocumentCenter/View/89614/01-20152016-CHARTER-Clean-Feb-2016-Full-Size?bidId=) The Charter also notes that the specific statement of particular executive powers shall not be construed as limiting the executive powers of the County Executive.

== List of executives ==
Order	Executive	Party	Took office	Left office	Terms
1	John Louws	nonpartisan	January 1, 1979	January 1, 1984	1
2	Shirley Van Zanten	nonpartisan	January 1, 1984	January 1, 1996	3
3	Pete Kremen	Democratic	January 1, 1996	January 1, 2012	4
2	Jack Louws	Independent	January 1, 2012	January 1, 2020	2
3	Satpal Sidhu	Democratic	January 1, 2020	Incumbent	2

== See also ==
- King County Executive
- Pierce County Executive
- Snohomish County Executive
