= Jason Overstreet =

American politician from Washington

Member of the Washington House of Representatives from the 42nd district
- In office January 10, 2011 – January 12, 2015
- Preceded by: Doug Ericksen
- Succeeded by: Luanne Van Werven

Personal details
- Party: Republican
- Spouse: Jessica Overstreet
- Children: 5

Jason Overstreet is an American politician from Washington. Overstreet is a former Republican member of the Washington House of Representatives, representing the 42nd district from 2011 to 2015.

== Awards ==
- 2014 Guardians of Small Business award. Presented by NFIB.

== Personal life ==
Overstreet's wife is Jessica Overstreet. They have five children. Overstreet and his family live in Lynden, Washington.
