= Jesse Brand =

American songwriter, musician and actor

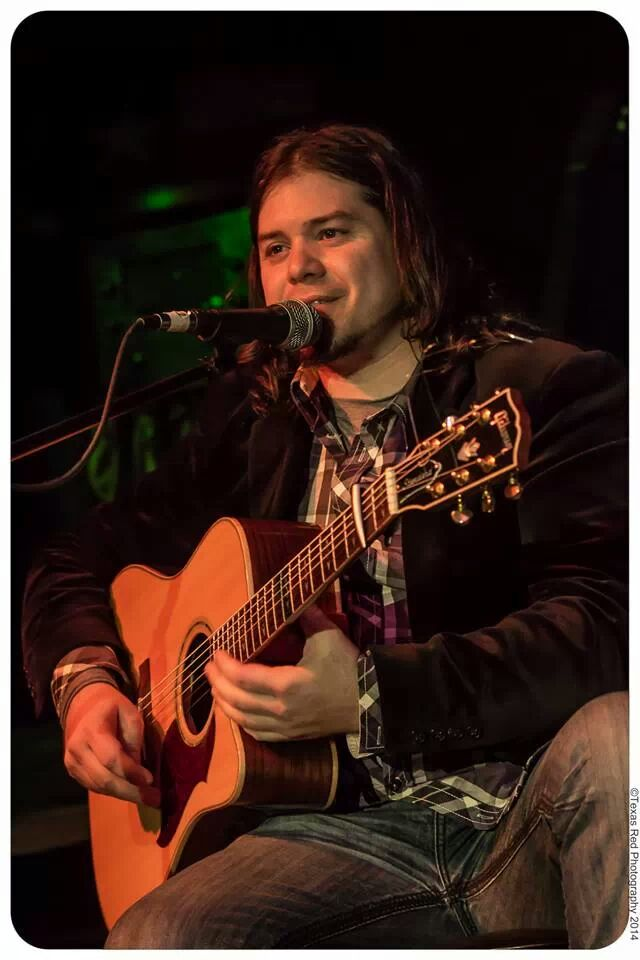
- Jesse Brand 2014 Texas Music Awards

Background information
- Born: Jesse David Brand; Ferndale, Washington, United States
- Genres: country, rock
- Occupations: Musician, songwriter, Actor
- Instruments: Vocals, guitar, piano, bass guitar, drums, banjo, mandolin
- Label: FiveSlumpRecords

Jesse David Brand is an American songwriter, musician and actor.

== Personal life ==
Jesse Brand was born in Ferndale, Washington. He is the youngest son of Steve Brand, former touring musician, playing drums and guitar for Country Music acts David Frizzell, Tex Williams, Rose Maddox, Rusty Draper, and Forrest Lee Sr, as well as touring with Rock and Roll bands like Creedence Clearwater Revival and Steppenwolf and Gail Brand, an American Sign Language Interpreter and schoolteacher. He spent five years in the MPFL (minor professional football league) with the North Texas Stampede (Fort Worth, Texas) and Northwest Avalanche (Bellingham, Washington). Jesse lives in Nashville, Tennessee.

== Music career ==
During a 2011 interview on Talk It Up TV, Brand stated his dreams of a musical future started when he was six years old, while watching his father's band... "I saw what music did to those people, and I at that moment, made a conscious decision. I said to myself, that's what I'm gonna do with my life." He has shared stages with acts such as Lee Brice, Luke Bryan, Randy Houser, Jamey Johnson, Willie Nelson, Merle Haggard, Loretta Lynn, Kris Kristofferson, Bob Dylan, The Doobie Brothers, and has been in bands with Audley Freed and Charlie Daniels. To date, Jesse Brand has released 11 albums under his own label, FiveSlumpRecords, and is considered an important figure among today's songwriters "...prolific, elegant, beautiful and dark... he is one of the last of the true hardcore troubadours. In 2014, Jesse Brand won the Award for "Song of the Year", from the Academy of Texas Music, for his song "Praying For Rain". He was also nominated for "Male Vocalist of the Year", the same year.

== Filmography ==
List of film credits
Year	Title	Role	Notes
2010	Lone Star		3 Episodes
2013–Present	Nashville	Musician/Roadie	37 Episodes
2014	Get on Up (film)	Musician/Paris Concert	
2015	The Dust Storm	Musician	
2015–Present	Still the King	Elvis Impersonator	3 Episodes
2016	"Rounding Third"		
2016	Rectify		1 Episode
2019	“Roll With It”		

== Discography ==
- Live From The White Elephant (2004)
- Pills Booze and Grass (2005)
- The Cocaine Sessions (2006)
- 3 Steps To The Wishing Well (2007)
- Tuggin' On The Devil's Sleeve (2008)
- The Unreleased Bull Sessions (2008)
- The Suicide Tapes (Unreleased) (2008)
- 28 Days (2009)
- Through The Fire (2009)
- Back Here On The Floor (Wisely and Slow) (2010)
- When The Dust Settles Vol 1 (2013)
- When The Dust Settles Vol 2 (2014)
- The Charlie French Tapes (Working Title) (2015) - In Production
- It Is What It Is (2015)

== Nominations and awards ==
Year	Nominee / work	Award	Result
Academy of Texas Music|2014	"Praying For Rain"	Song of the Year	Won
Academy of Texas Music|2014	"When The Dust Settles"	Male Vocalist of the Year"	Nominated
Big Star Music Awards|2014	"When The Dust Settles"	Male Vocalist of the Year"	Nominated

General

- 2014 Won Academy of Texas Music "Song of the Year" for "Praying For Rain"
- 2014 Nominated Academy of Texas Music "Male Vocalist of the Year" for When The Dust Settles.
- 2014 Nominated Big Star Music Awards "Male Vocalist of the Year"
