= Dale Brandland =

American politician

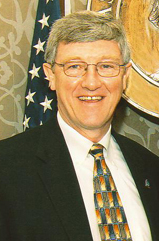

Member of the Washington Senate from the 42nd district
- In office January 13, 2003 – January 10, 2011
- Preceded by: Georgia Gardner
- Succeeded by: Doug Ericksen

Personal details
- Born: Los Angeles, California
- Party: Republican
- Spouse: Jean
- Education: Washington State University, FBI National Academy
- Profession

Dale E. Brandland is a former member of the Washington State Senate, representing the 42nd district from 2003 to 2011 as a Republican.

== Awards ==
Brandland was the recipient of a 2009 Fuse "Sizzle" Award. He was given the Profiles in Courage Sizzle Award for voting for a bill expanding domestic partnership rights for same sex couples and their families in the face of significant opposition from his fellow Republicans in the state Legislature.
