= Michael Shepard =

American politician

Member-elect of the Washington State Senate from the 42nd district
- Assuming office January 2027
- Succeeding: Sharon Shewmake

Personal details
- Party: Democratic

Michael Shepard is an American politician. A member of the Democratic Party, he is the member-elect for the 42nd district of the Washington State Senate.
