= Vincent Buys =

American politician from Washington

Member of the Washington House of Representatives from the 42nd district
- In office January 10, 2011 – January 14, 2019
- Preceded by: Kelli Linville
- Succeeded by: Sharon Shewmake

Personal details
- Born: Vincent Kyle Buys; March 21, 1979 (age 47) Lynden, Washington, U.S.
- Party: Republican
- Education: Bellingham Technical College (AAS)

Vincent Kyle Buys (born March 21, 1979) was a member of the Washington House of Representatives, representing the 42nd district. He was the ranking member of the House Agriculture and Natural Resources Committee. He also served on the Appropriations Committee and the Appropriations Subcommittee on General Government and IT.

Buys earned an Associate of Science degree from in electronic technologies and electronics from Bellingham Technical College.

== Awards ==
- 2014 Guardians of Small Business award. Presented by NFIB.
