= Hovander Homestead Park =

- Hovander Homestead
- U.S. National Register of Historic Places
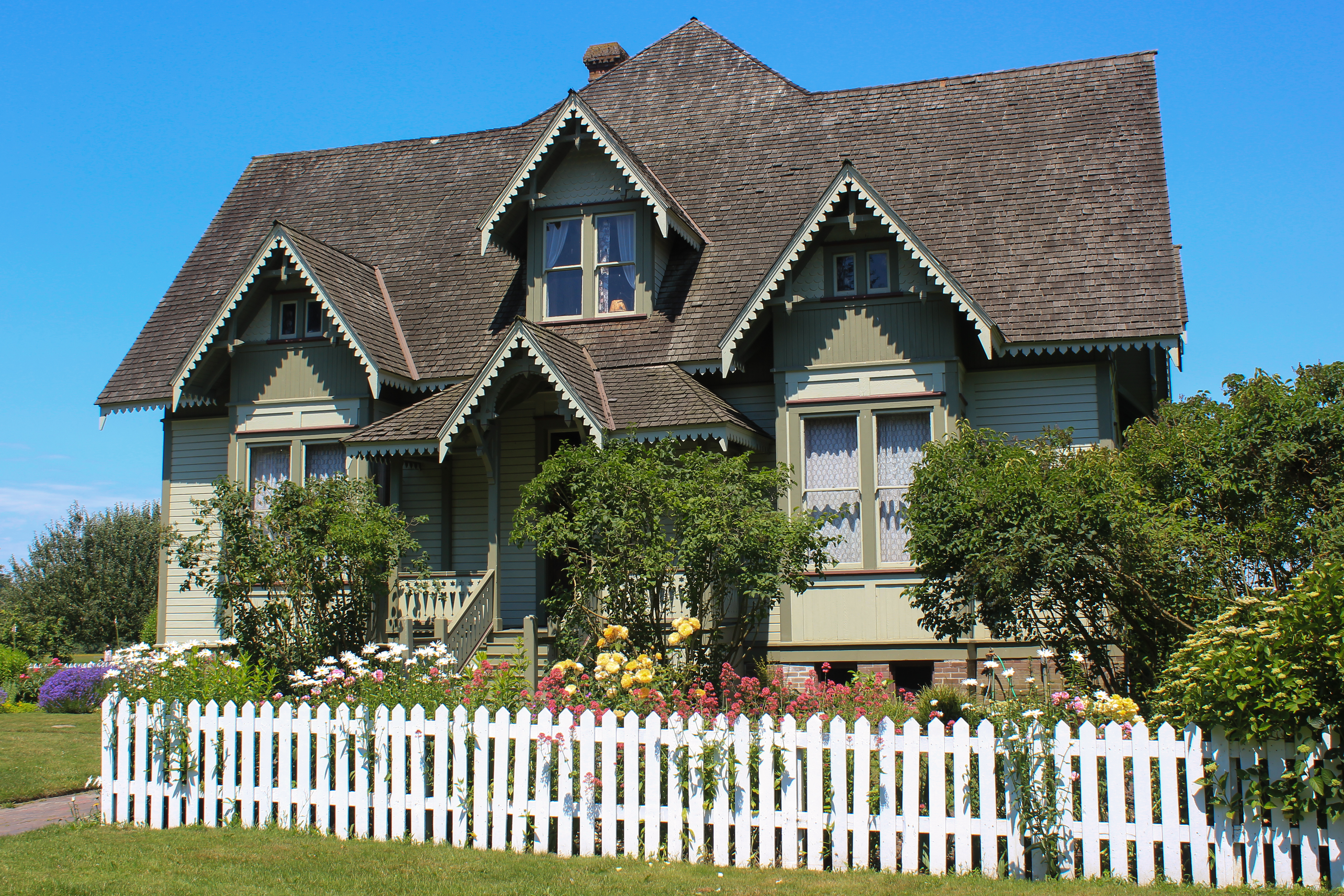
- Hovander Homestead farmhouse

- Location within Washington (state) Location within the United States
- Location: 5299 Neilson Rd., Ferndale, Washington
- Area: 60 acres (24 ha)
- Built: 1901
- Architect: Hovander, Holan O.
- Architectural style: Stick/eastlake
- Website: www.whatcomcounty.us/3541/Hovander-Homestead-Park
- NRHP reference No.: 74001990
- Added to NRHP: October 16, 1974

Hovander Homestead Park is a 350-acre county park in Ferndale, Washington, in the United States. The park borders the Nooksack River, and includes access to Tennant Lake. It is named for the Hovander family, who immigrated from Sweden to the property in 1898 and designed the farmhouse, barn, and other buildings, some of which include distinctive architectural features. The homestead was owned by the Hovander family until 1969 when the Whatcom County government purchased the land from Hokan Hovander's son, Otis, and it became a county park in 1971.

The park has been preserved to show the lives of 20th-century pioneers in the Northwest, as well as to preserve the history of the Hovander family. Hovander Homestead Park was added to the National Register of Historic Places in 1974. In 1978, the park received the National Trust for Historic Preservation award for the preservation of a significant historic site.

== Hovander family ==
Hokan (also spelled Hakan and Holan in various sources) Hovander, an immigrant from Skåne, Sweden, moved to the Pacific Northwest with his wife Louisa Leontine Johansdatter Lof and several children in 1897. Hovander, an architect and bricklayer, initially settled in Seattle but later moved to Ferndale with his family to farm the land. He arrived in Ferndale in 1898 and paid $4,000 ($154,800 in 2018) for 60 acres (24 ha) on the Nooksack River that was purchased from Betsey Nielson. The property included two log cabins, farm animals, and farm equipment.

== Design and construction ==
=== Farmhouse ===
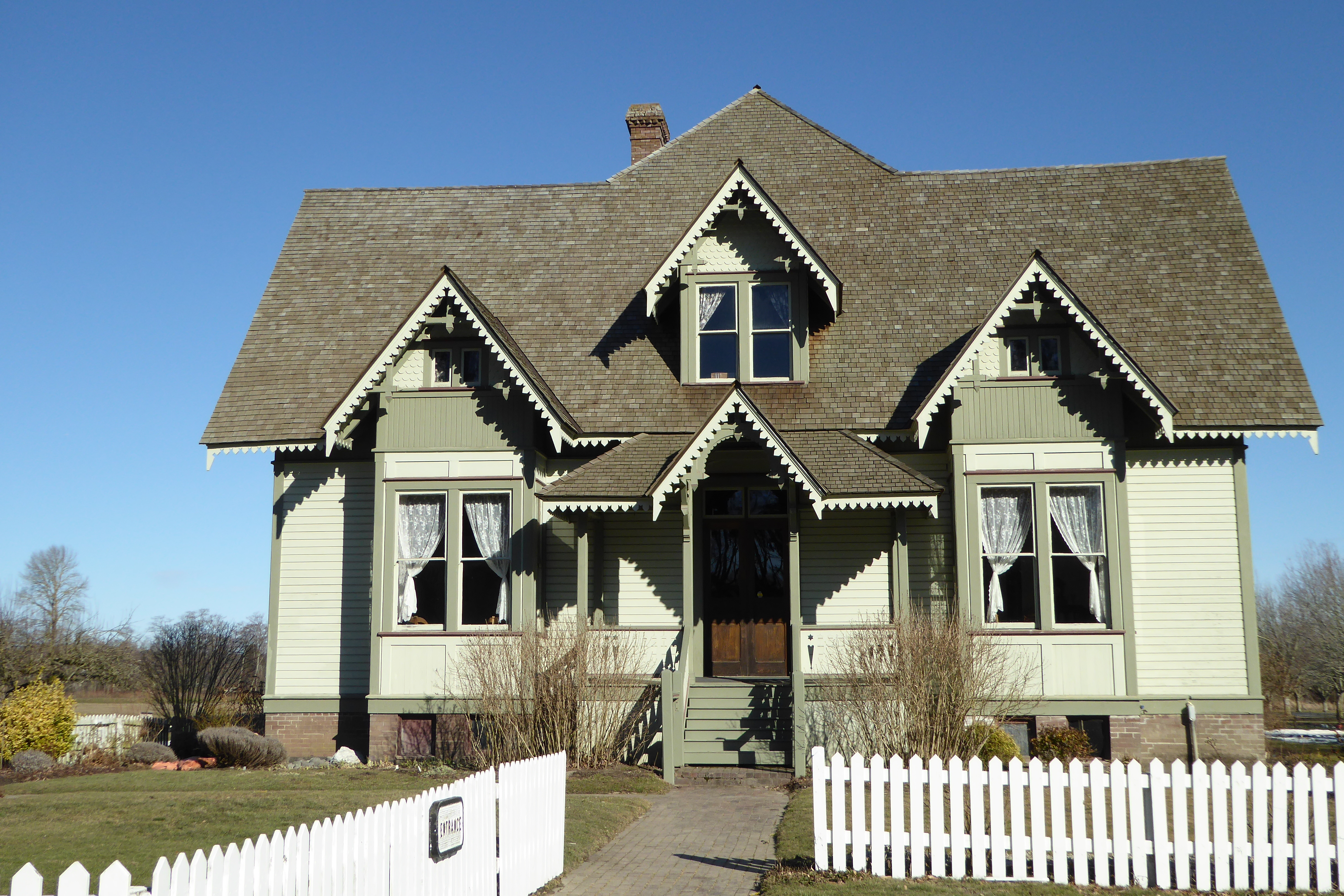
Hovander Farmhouse

In June 1899, Hovander finished his plan for the house and ordered 52,000 board feet of fir and cedar. The wood was soaked in linseed oil for two years to cure, meaning it has not needed treatment since. In spring 1901, the construction of the house began, and the carpentry work was finished by Carl Lindgren, a Swede.

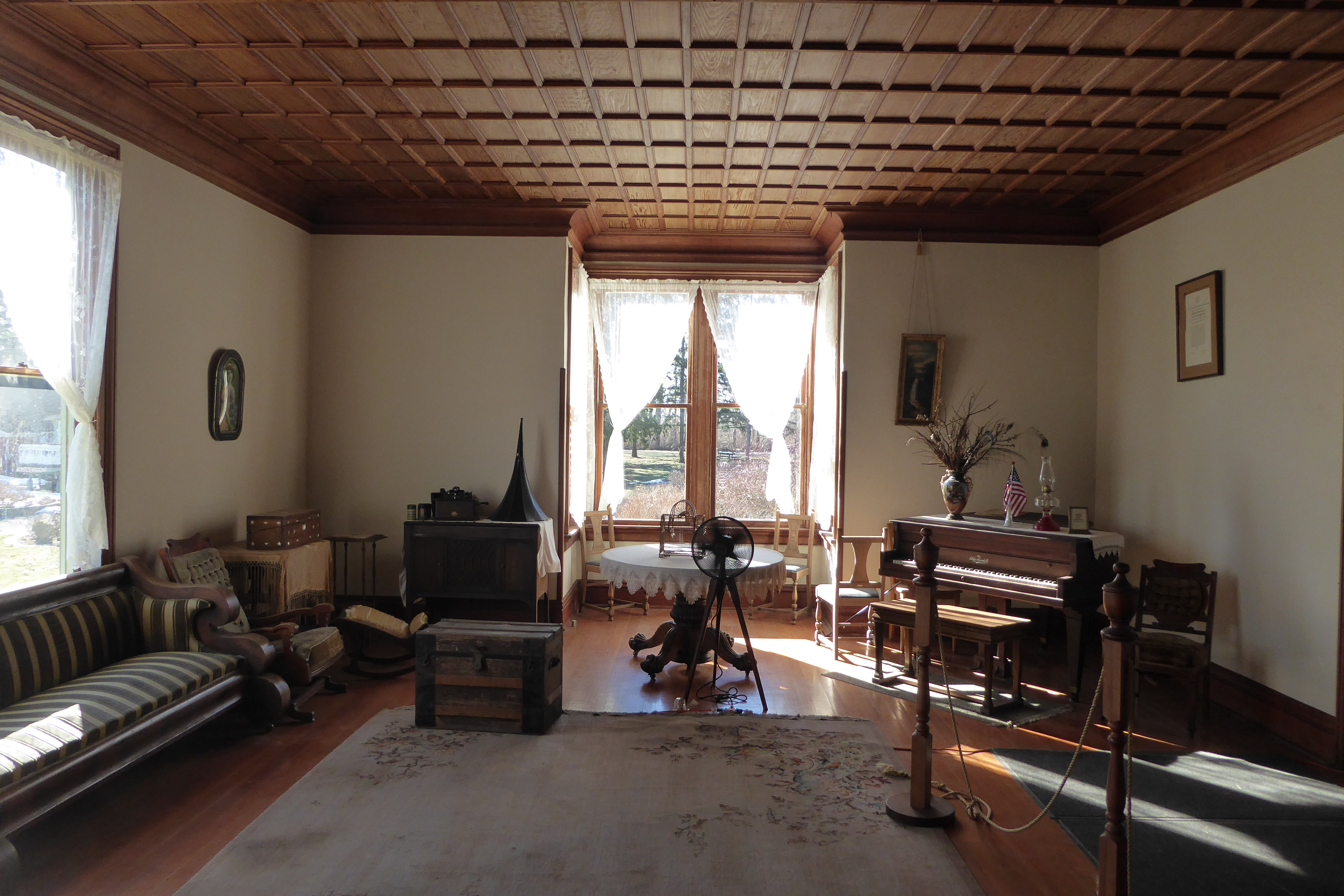
Hovander Farmhouse Interior

In the late 19th century, it was common in the Northwest for settlers to imitate the style of architecture from their previous homes. Many aspects of Scandinavian architecture are present within the house, including the egg and dart trim design, representing fertility, modified to fit a traditional geometric Scandinavian artistic design. Another example is the Star of David openwork design on the porch railings, a very popular design of that time period. Additional examples of Scandinavian influence include the linseed oil treatment, large and open rooms with windows and doorways in proportion to the size of the room, and high ceilings.

There are no fireplaces in the farmhouse, and it was one of the first houses in Whatcom County to utilize a central heating system. Hovander designed the house with doors between each room that can open and close in multiple directions to direct the flow of heat throughout the house. The house was completed in 1903, and had 6,800 square feet (630 m^{2}) with three bedrooms, a library, a dining room, and a kitchen.

=== The barn ===
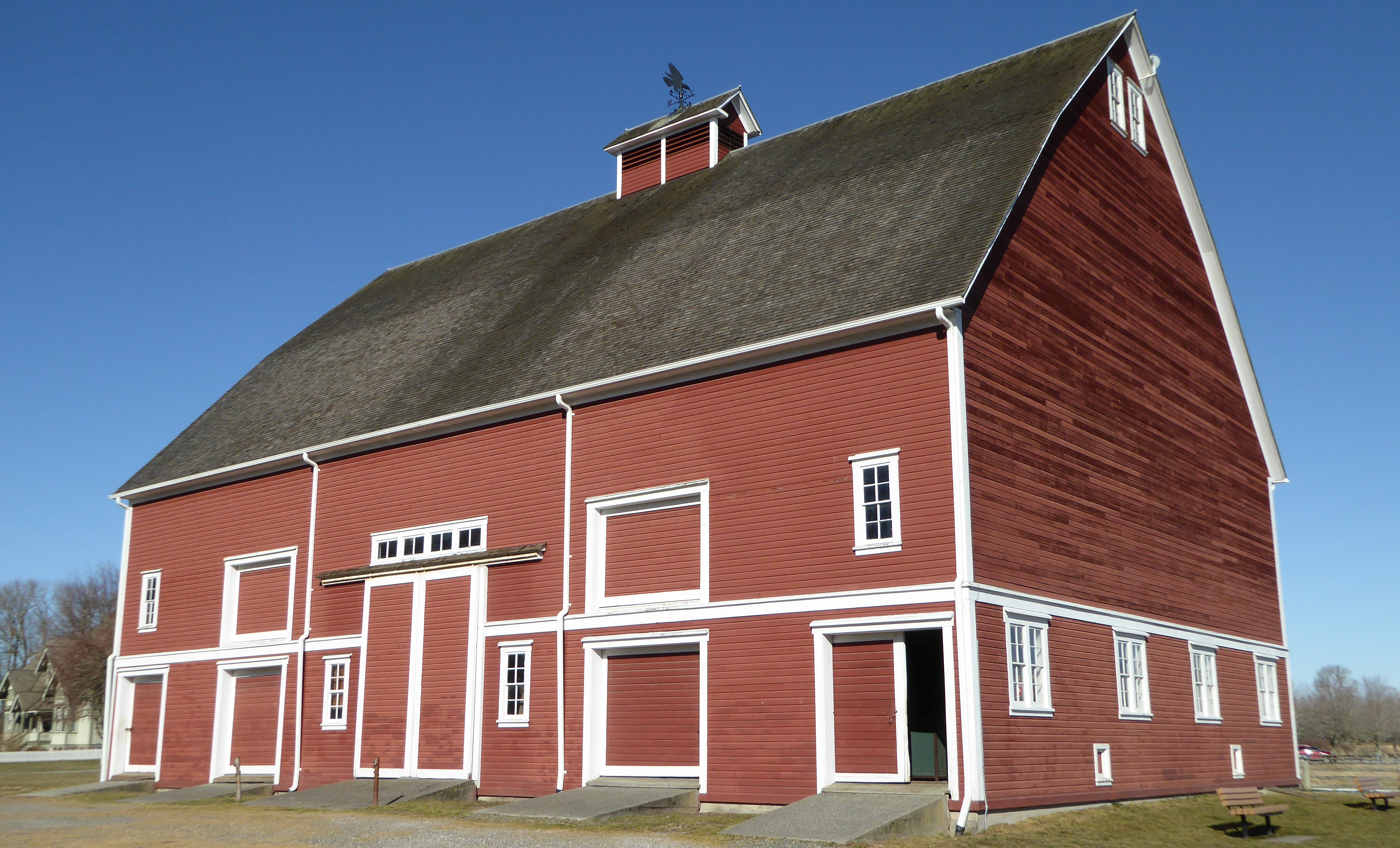
Hovander Barn

At the same time that Hovander was planning and designing the farmhouse, he was also planning the barn. While the farmhouse is representative of Swedish architecture, Hovander's design for the barn was influenced by the barn designs he saw in the United States. Hovander disliked the common Swedish barn design of the time, as they were typically small, and was instead impressed with the size and loft design of barns that he had seen in the United States. He designed the barn as a large space with a high ceiling, and hired men from Bellingham to build it.

Hovander painted the barn with a mixture of oil and iron rich soil which oxidized to a dull red, a practice that reportedly originated in Scandinavia. The Hovander Homestead is built on the Nooksack River's flood lands and Hokan had to account for the natural landscape by building the barn and the house on raised platforms.

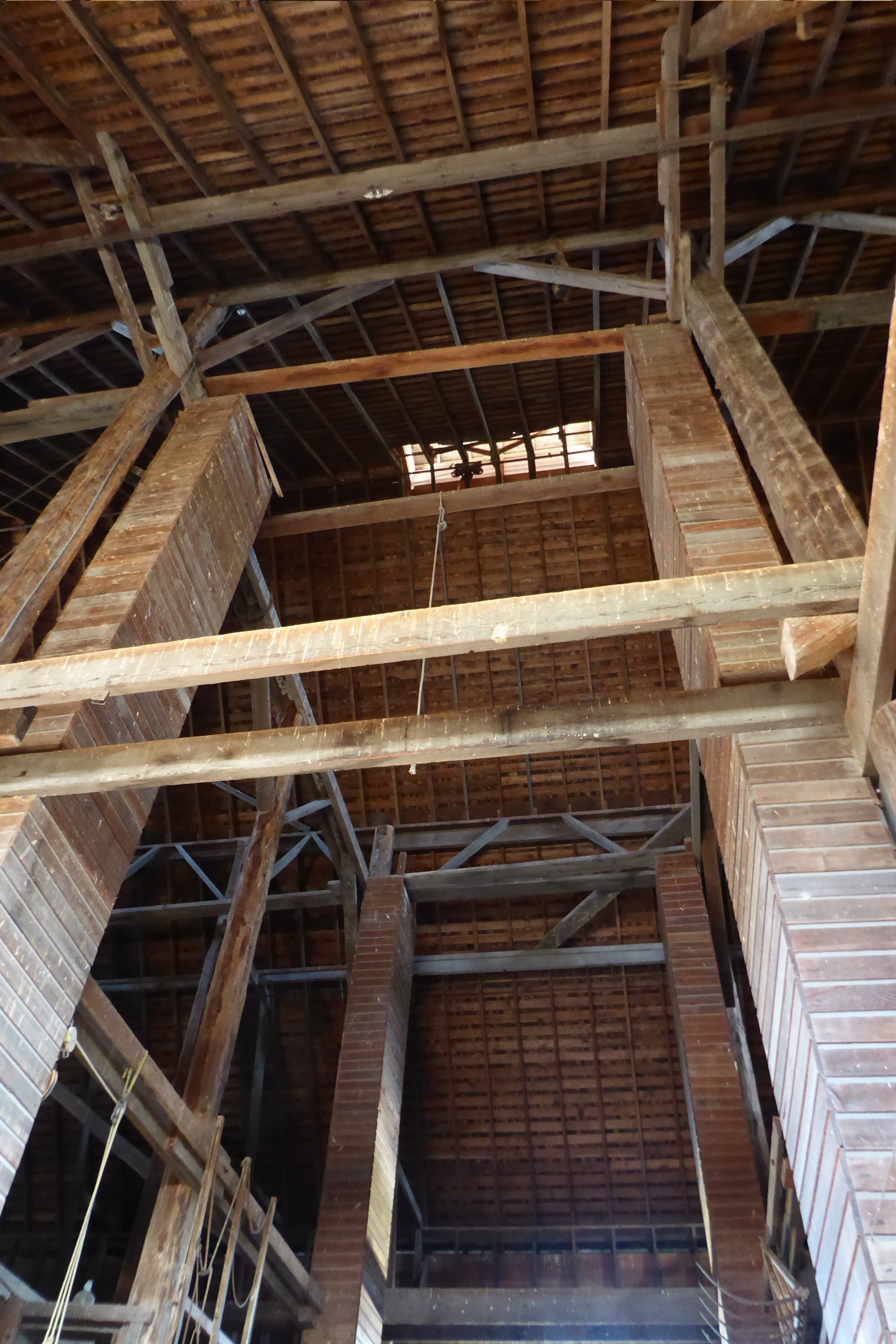
Hovander Barn Interior

== Hovander homestead ==
The Hovanders soon began farming the land after moving into the log cabins on the property. The family's first crop was oats, but later they also farmed sweet corn, hay, dried fruit, and pork. Two fruit orchards came with the property, and the apple orchard is still present at the park today. The family members also made their own soap and candles.

Leontine was trained as a cook in Sweden and cooked for the family and the hired hands on the farm. It was tradition for Swedish women to take over and manage the farm whenever their husband was not at the farm, so Leontine was well-known and respected by the farm workers. The Hovander children attended school in Ferndale and used pioneer trails or rowed across the river to get into town.

Not long after arriving in Ferndale, Hovander began building a Holstein dairy herd from the 12 cows that came with the homestead. By 1919, the herd had grown to over 50 cows, but the entire herd contracted tuberculosis from an unknown source and had to be culled. The Hovanders then replaced the Holsteins with Guernseys. Hokan Hovander died in 1915, and his family continued to run the farm.

Eight years after the cows died, the two youngest children, Vera and Ada, both came down with tuberculosis. Ada recovered, but Vera died in 1929. Leontine died in 1936, aged 77. After the death of their sister and mother, Otis, Charles, and Angelo ran the farm, adding raspberries, sugar beets, and chickens to the farm products. Otis was the last of the Hovander family to live on the farm, remaining there until 1971.

== County park ==
In 1969, the Hovander homestead was purchased for $60,000 by Whatcom County Parks and Recreation. Otis lived in the house until 1971 when the park officially opened to the public, and died in 1979. Between 1969 and 1971, the house and barn were significantly repaired and renovated in order to be opened to the public. The farm tools and most of the items on display in the farmhouse were used by the family. Eventually, animals were moved in to establish the homestead environment of the park.

=== The demonstration garden ===
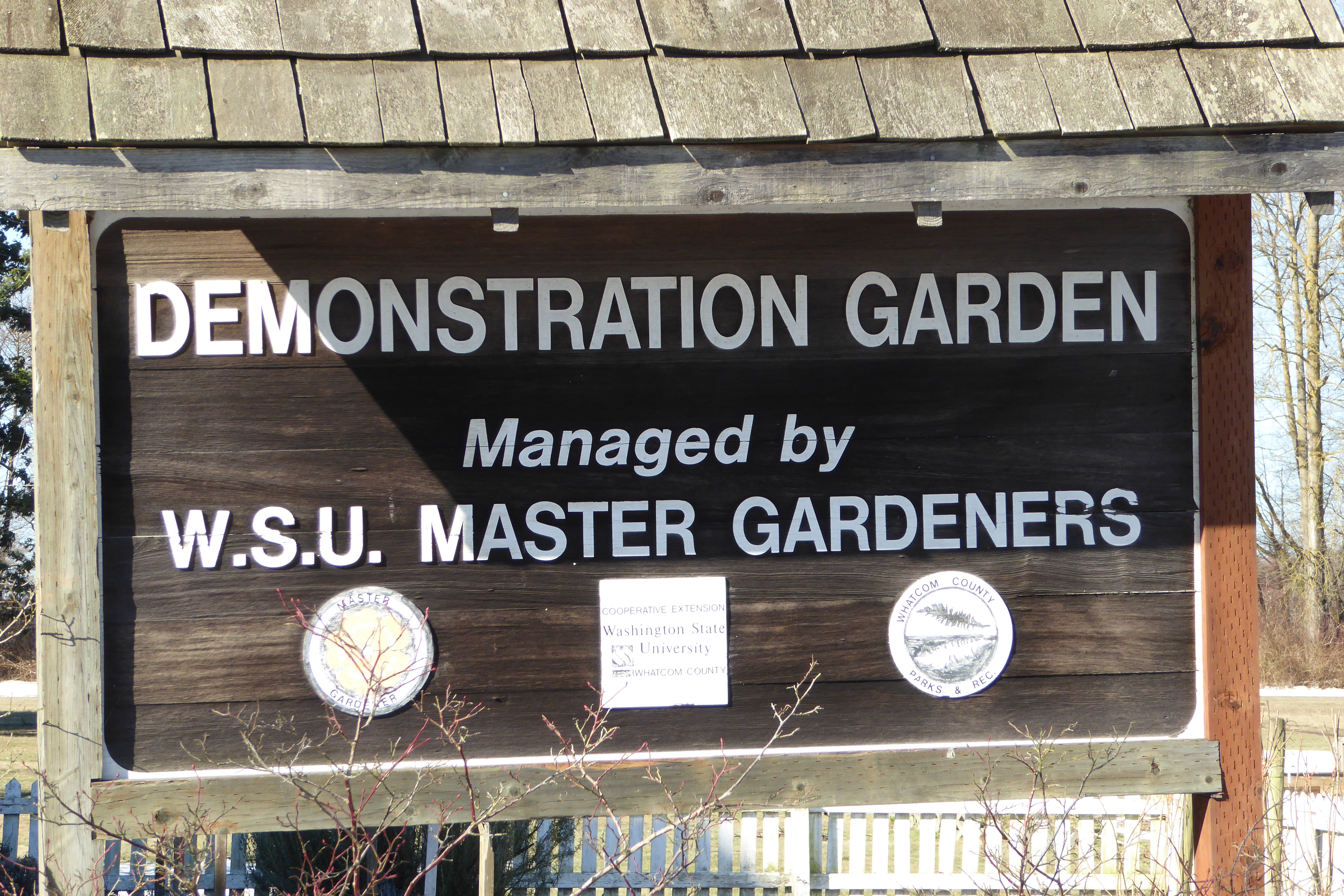
Hovander Demonstration Garden

In the following years, a demonstration garden was installed to show what the Hovander's garden may have looked like, and to provide landscaping for the area directly surrounding the farmhouse. The demonstration garden is now maintained by Whatcom County Parks and Recreation as well as the Washington State University Extension Service and the Master Gardener Foundation. The garden is experimental and used for teaching, and the produce grown is given to the local food bank.

=== Tennant Lake ===
The Tennant Lake section of the park includes an interpretive center, fragrance garden, wildlife viewing tower and boardwalk with viewing platforms over the wetlands adjacent to the lake. A support organization, Friends of Tennant Lake and Hovander Homestead Park, has been formed to maintain the area. Wildlife using the lake as a habitat includes bald eagles, coots, ospreys, swallows, ducks and great blue herons.

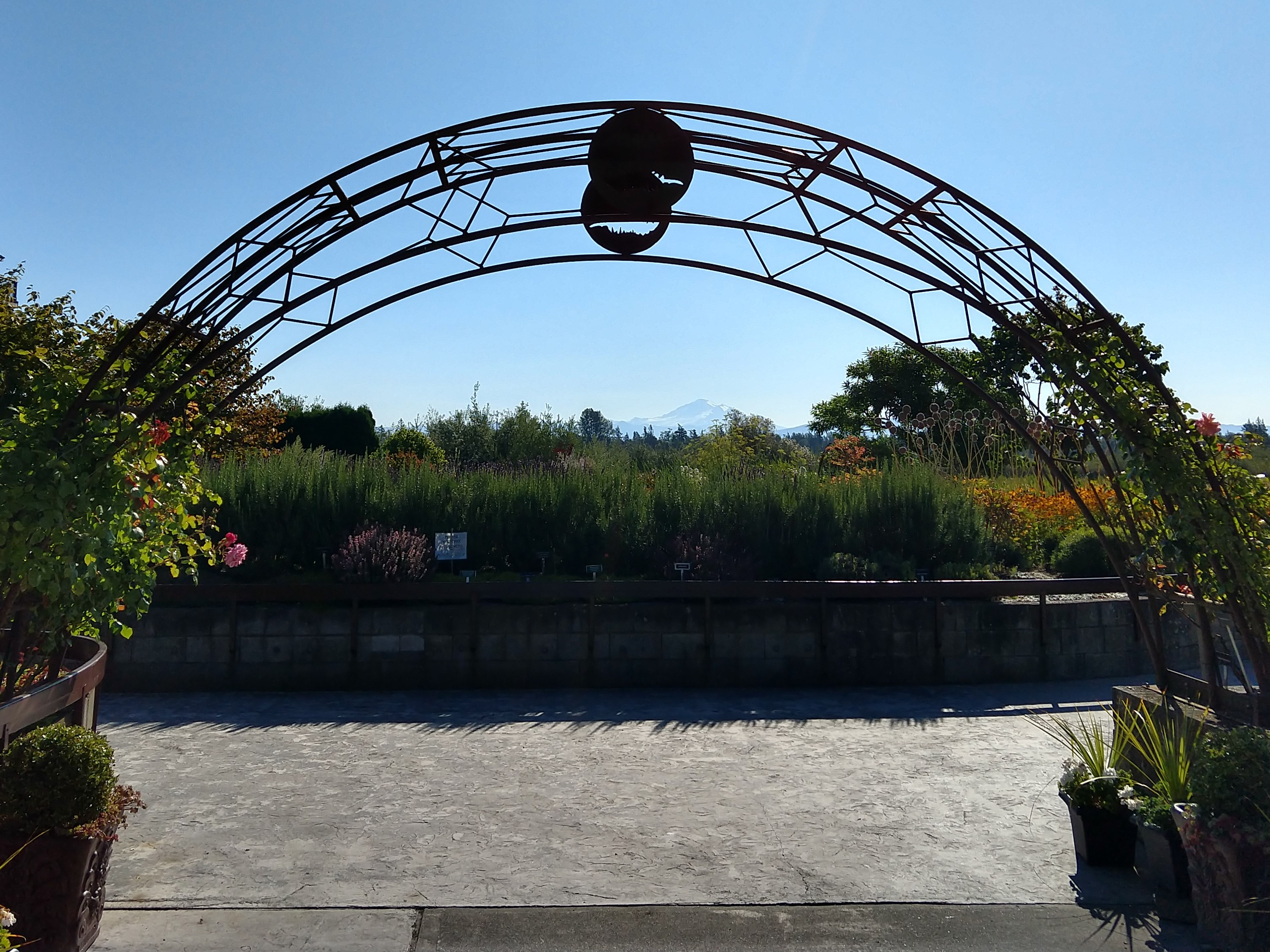
Entrance to Fragrance Garden - Tennant Lake Section - 8/16/2020

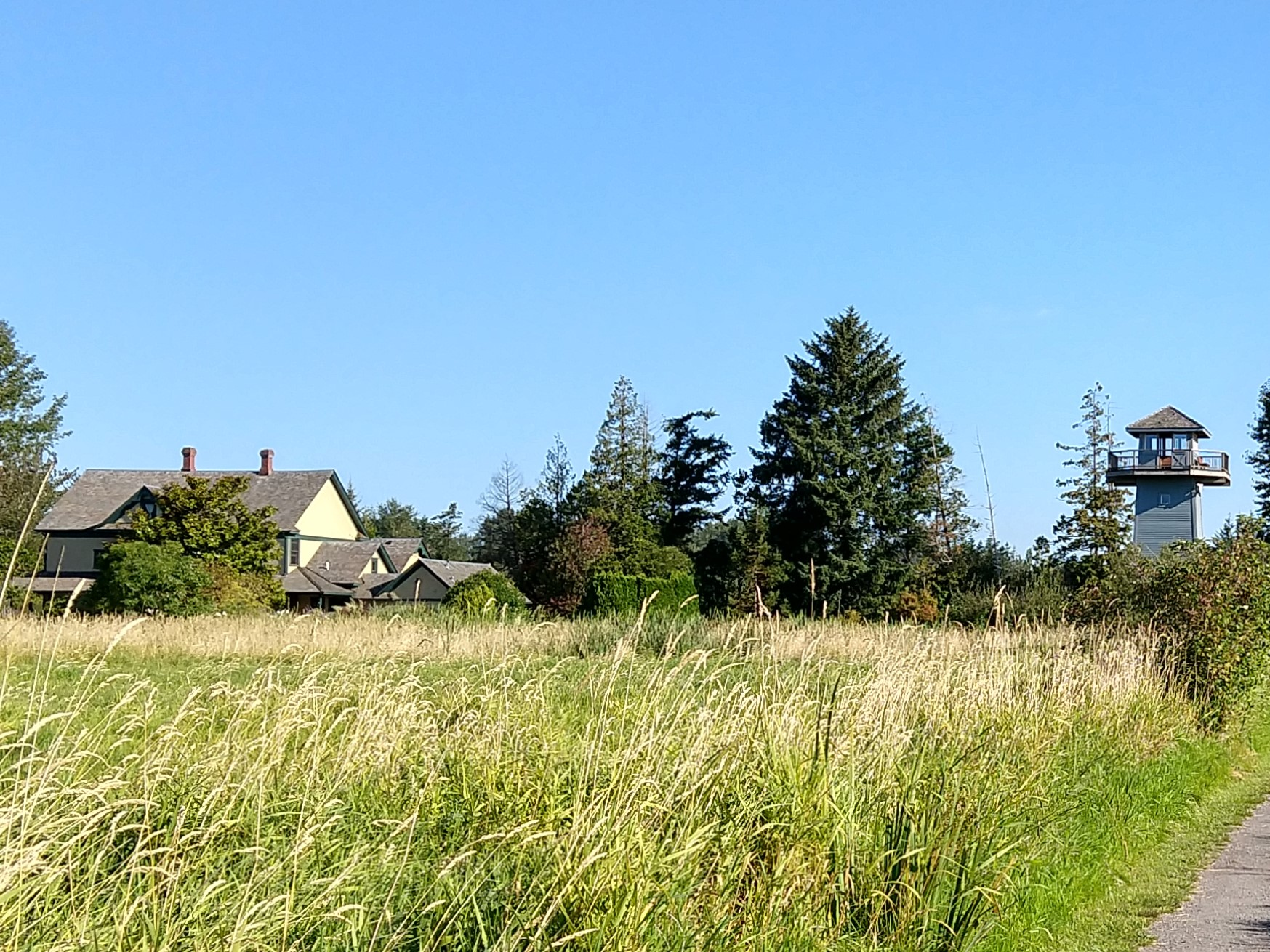
Wildlife Viewing Tower and Int. Center - Tennant Lake Section - 8/16/2020 @ 9:20 AM

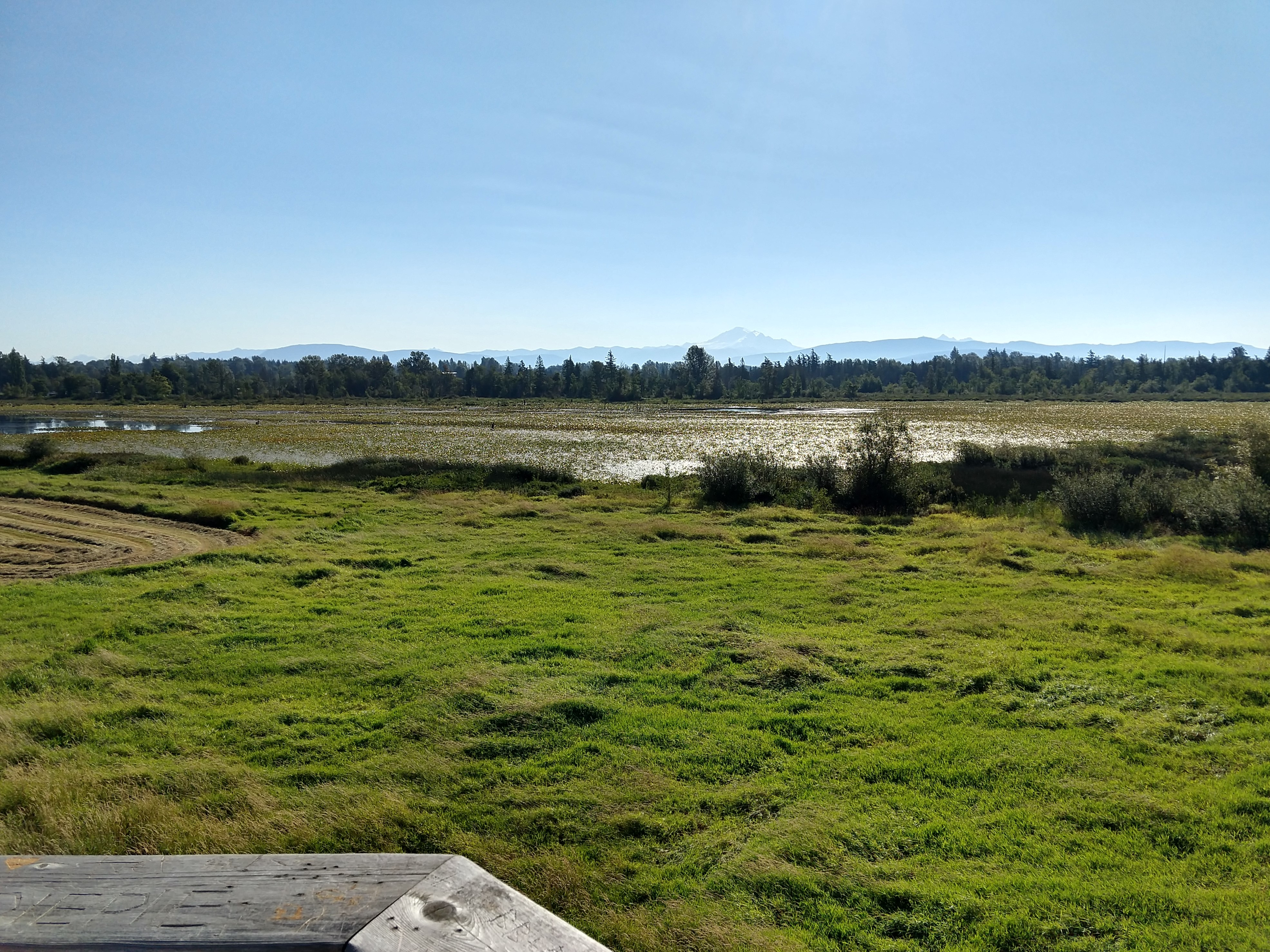
View from Wildlife Viewing Tower - 8/16/2020

=== Activities and tourism ===
As part of the park's status as a historical site, historical tours take place during the late spring and summer, led by a park supervisor or historian. A trail along the river between Hovander Homestead Park and Tennant Lake provides views of Mount Baker. The park is also used as a venue for various types of events and functions, as well as annual events such as Ski to Sea and the Highland Scottish Games.
