= KISM =

Radio station in Bellingham, Washington

- Bellingham, Washington; United States
- Broadcast area: Northwest Washington; Southwestern British Columbia
- Frequency: 92.9 MHz (HD Radio)
- Branding: 92.9 KISM

Programming
- Format: Classic rock
- Subchannels: HD2: KGMI simulcast (news/talk); HD3: Classic hits "98.9 K-Bay"

Ownership
- Owner: Saga Communications; (Saga Broadcasting, LLC)
- Sister stations: KAFE; KGMI; KPUG

History
- First air date: March 1960 (as KGMI-FM)
- Former call signs: KGMI-FM (1960–1970); KVGM (1970–1973)

Technical information
- Licensing authority: FCC
- Facility ID: 34469
- Class: C
- ERP: 50,000 watts
- HAAT: 744 meters (2,441 ft)
- Translator: HD3: 98.9 K255DC (Bellingham)

Links
- Public license information: Public file; LMS
- Webcast: Listen Live; Listen Live (HD3)
- Website: kism.com 989kbay.com (HD3)

KISM (92.9 FM) is a commercial radio station in Bellingham, Washington, United States. The station's transmitter is on Mount Constitution on Orcas Island, within Moran State Park. KISM is run by the Cascade Radio Group, owned by Saga Communications and airs a classic rock format.

KISM serves Northwest Washington with a strong signal that reaches into Greater Vancouver and Victoria in Canada and can also be heard in Seattle's northern suburbs, as well as the Olympic Peninsula.

== History ==
In March 1960, the station first signed on as KGMI-FM. It was owned by International Good Music, Inc., serving as the FM counterpart to KGMI (790 AM). The two stations simulcast their programming. It switched to KVGM in 1970.

In 1973, it began airing an automated Top 40 format, changing to its current call sign, KISM.

In 1998, Saga Communications purchased KISM and KGMI for $9.8 million.

== HD Radio ==
KISM's third HD Radio channel carries a classic hits format branded "98.9 K-Bay", in reference to FM translator K255DC (98.9 FM). The "K-Bay" programming had previously been carried on KBAI (930 AM) from 2017 until the AM station's closure 2024.

Broadcast translator for KISM-HD3
Call sign	Frequency	City of license	FID	ERP (W)	Class	Transmitter coordinates	FCC info
K255DC	98.9 FM	Bellingham, Washington	142903	250	D	48°46′33.4″N 122°26′29.6″W	LMS
