= Tennant Lake =

- Location within Washington (state)
- Location: Whatcom County, Washington
- Coordinates: 48°49′55″N 122°34′44″W
- Type: lake
- Basin countries: United States
- Surface area: 80 acres (32 ha)
- Surface elevation: 23 ft (7 m)

Tennant Lake is a lake in the U.S. state of Washington. Hovander Homestead Park encompasses the southwest corner of this lake, while the remainder of the lake is in the Tennant Lake Wildlife Area Unit, owned and managed by the Washington Department of Fish and Wildlife. Tennant Lake is an 80-acre (32 ha), shallow, peat-bog lake, and hosts a variety of birds and mammals.

Tennant Lake was named after John Tennant, an early settler.

== See also ==
- List of lakes in Washington
