= Ann Anderson (politician) =

American educator and politician

Member of the Washington Senate from the 42nd district
- In office January 12, 1987 – September 15, 1998
- Preceded by: Barney Goltz
- Succeeded by: Joe Elenbaas

Personal details
- Born: 1952 (age 73–74) Yakima, Washington, U.S.
- Party: Republican
- Spouse: Eric
- Education: Central Washington University (BA, MA)

Ann Anderson (born 1952) is an American educator and politician and who served as a member of the Washington State Senate, representing the 42nd district from 1987 to 1998. A member of the Republican Party, she ran for Washington State Commissioner of Public Lands in 1992, losing to Democrat Jennifer Belcher in an election that saw historic results for Washington women, especially Democrats. In 1996, she ran for lieutenant governor and was defeated by Democrat Brad Owen.
