= Homer Nunamaker =

American politician

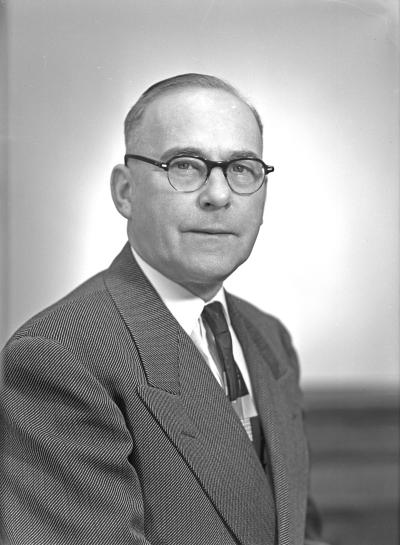
- Nunamaker in 1955

Member of the Washington Senate from the 42nd district
- In office January 10, 1955 – January 14, 1963
- Preceded by: Vaughan Brown
- Succeeded by: R. Frank Atwood

Member of the Washington House of Representatives from the 42nd district
- In office January 10, 1949 – January 12, 1953
- Preceded by: Leslie J. Peterson
- Succeeded by: Malcolm McBeath
- In office January 11, 1943 – January 13, 1947
- Preceded by: B. F. Reno Jr.
- Succeeded by: Leo C. Goodman

Personal details
- Born: Homer Okro Nunamaker; May 14, 1889 Greenup, Illinois, U.S.
- Died: May 21, 1964 (aged 75) Bellingham, Washington, U.S.
- Party: Democratic

Homer Ocro Nunamaker (May 14, 1889 – May 21, 1964) was an American politician in the state of Washington. He served in the Washington House of Representatives and Washington State Senate.
