= KPUG =

Radio station in Bellingham, Washington

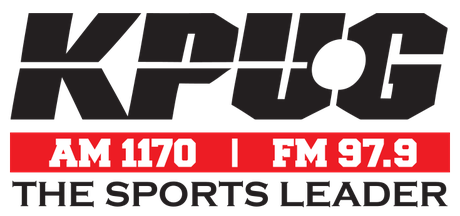
- Bellingham, Washington; United States
- Broadcast area: Whatcom County
- Frequency: 1170 kHz
- Branding: KPUG 1170

Programming
- Format: Sports
- Affiliations: ESPN Radio; Fox Sports Radio; Infinity Sports Network; Seattle Kraken; Seattle Mariners; Seattle Seahawks; Washington Huskies; Westwood One

Ownership
- Owner: Saga Communications; (Sage Broadcasting, LLC)
- Sister stations: KAFE; KGMI; KISM

History
- First air date: 1948

Technical information
- Licensing authority: FCC
- Facility ID: 58887
- Class: B
- Power: 10,000 watts day; 5,000 watts night
- Translator: 97.9 K250BW (Bellingham)

Links
- Public license information: Public file; LMS
- Webcast: Listen Live
- Website: www.kpug1170.com

KPUG (1170 AM) is a sports radio station in Bellingham, Washington, United States, transmitting from an antenna located off Sunset Drive. KPUG is operated by the Cascade Radio Group, owned by Saga Communications. The majority of local sports taking place in and around Whatcom County are broadcast on KPUG. Local programming includes "The Zone With Allan Fee," which runs weekdays from 3-6 pm.

KPUG serves Northwest Washington with a signal that reaches into Vancouver and Victoria in Canada and also reaches into Seattle's northern suburbs (daytime only) and the Olympic Peninsula.

== History ==
KPUG began broadcasting in early 1948 on 1170 kHz with 1,000 watts of power. It was an affiliate of the Don Lee Network. The station's principal owner was Jessica Longston.

== Translator ==
Call sign	Frequency	City of license	FID	ERP (W)	HAAT	Class	Transmitter coordinates	FCC info
K250BW	97.9 FM	Bellingham, Washington	143909	250	7 m (23 ft)	D	48°46′33.4″N 122°26′29.6″W	LMS
