= KAFE =

Radio station in Bellingham, Washington

- Bellingham, Washington; United States
- Broadcast area: Northwest Washington; Southwestern British Columbia
- Frequency: 104.1 MHz (HD Radio)
- Branding: KAFE 104.1

Programming
- Format: Adult contemporary

Ownership
- Owner: Saga Communications; (Saga Broadcasting, LLC)
- Sister stations: KGMI; KISM; KPUG

History
- First air date: July 2, 1965 (as KERI at 104.3)
- Former call signs: KERI (1965–1979); KNWR (1979–1989)
- Former frequencies: 104.3 MHz (1965–2010)
- Call sign meaning: "Café"

Technical information
- Licensing authority: FCC
- Facility ID: 58886
- Class: C
- ERP: 60,000 watts
- HAAT: 701 meters (2,300 ft)
- Transmitter coordinates: 48°40′49″N 122°50′31″W

Links
- Public license information: Public file; LMS
- Webcast: Listen Live
- Website: www.kafe.com

KAFE (104.1 FM, "KAFE 104.1", pronounced "Café") is a commercial FM radio station in Bellingham, Washington, United States. It is owned by Saga Communications, and is operated as part of its Cascade Radio Group; the broadcast license held by Saga Broadcasting, LLC. It airs an adult contemporary radio format, switching to Christmas music for much of November and December. The radio studios and offices are on Yew Street Road in Bellingham.

KAFE has an effective radiated power (ERP) of 60,000 watts. Its signal covers Northwest Washington and reaches into Vancouver and Victoria, British Columbia, and parts of the Olympic Peninsula and northern suburbs in the Seattle metropolitan area. The transmitter is atop Mount Constitution on Orcas Island, among the towers for other local FM and TV stations.

== History ==
The station signed on the air on July 2, 1965. Its call sign was KERI, originally broadcasting on 104.3 MHz. KERI was a sister station to KARI (550 AM) in Blaine. They were owned by Birch Bay Broadcasting and the two stations simulcast a country music format.

In the late 1970s, KERI began airing separate programming. From 1979 to 1989, it was KNWR, carrying the TM Stereo Rock automated Adult Top 40 format. On November 1, 1989, it flipped to an adult contemporary format, taking the KAFE call letters.

On January 14, 2010, KAFE swapped frequencies with Vancouver's 104.1 CHHR-FM to reduce interference with 104.5 KMCQ in Covington, Washington.
