= Ferndale, Washington =

- City
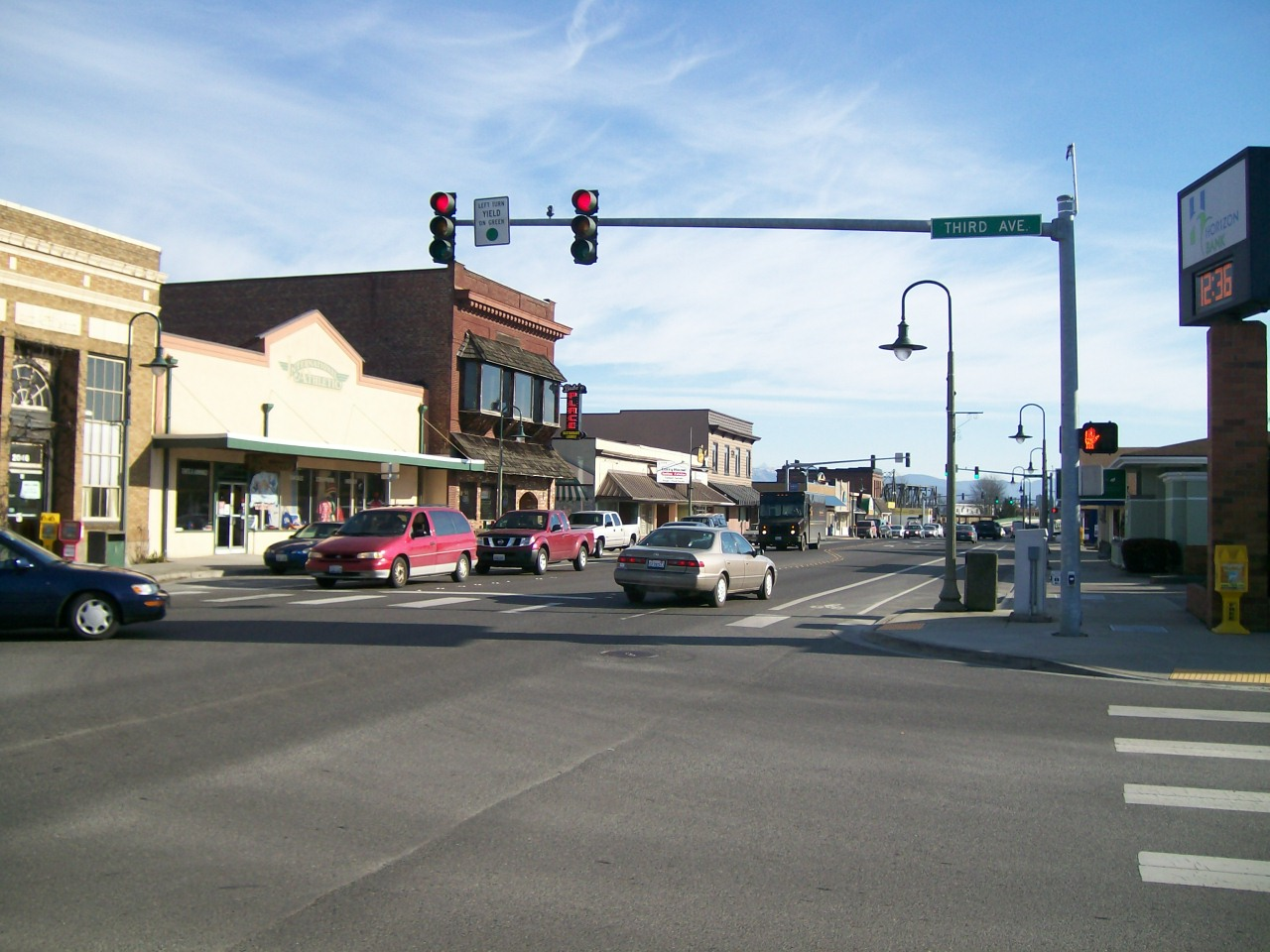
- Downtown Ferndale

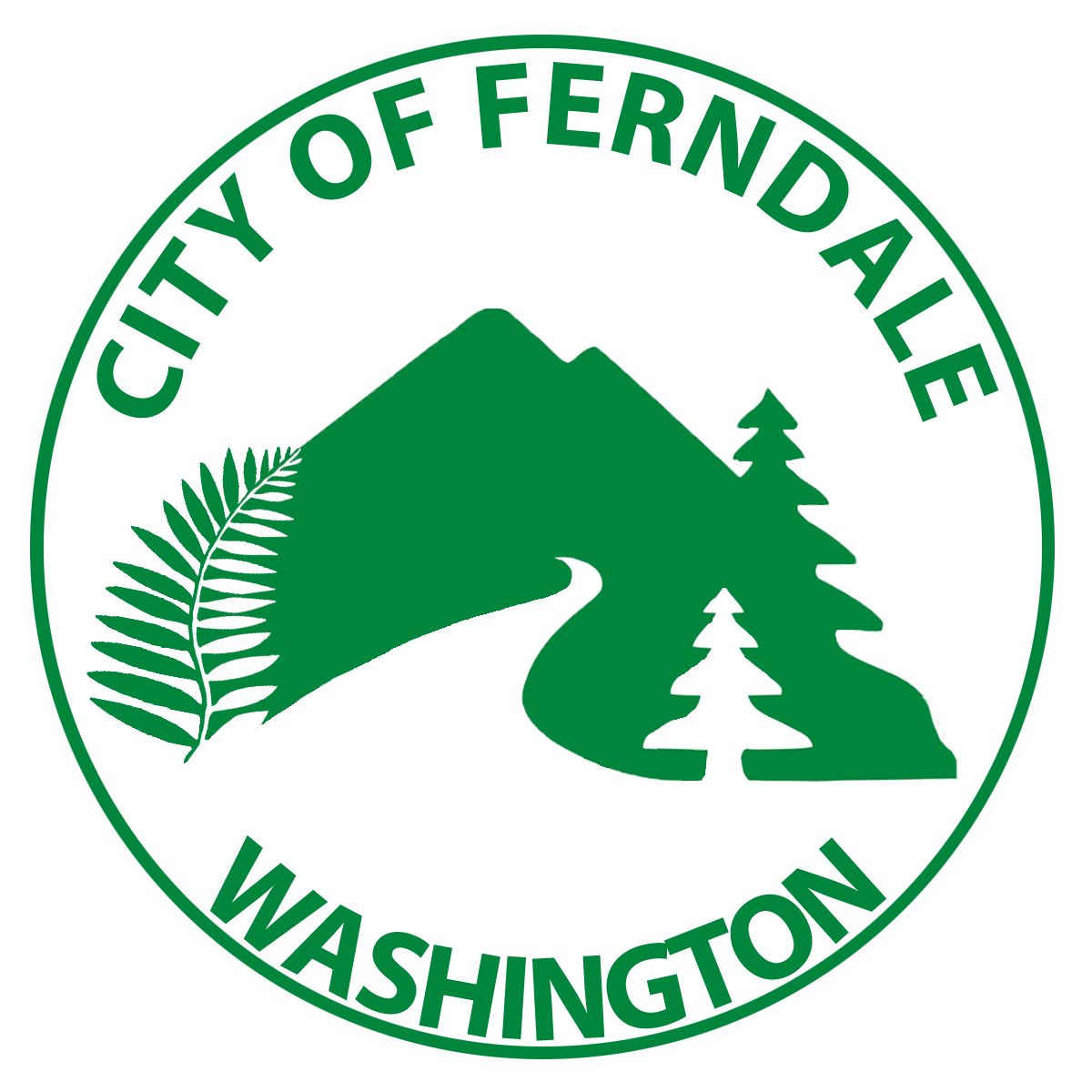
- Seal
- Interactive map of Ferndale, Washington
- Coordinates: 48°51′38″N 122°36′28″W
- Country: United States
- State: Washington
- County: Whatcom
- Incorporated: March 19, 1907

Government
  - Type: Mayor–council
  - Mayor: Greg Hansen

Area
  - City: 7.14 sq mi (18.49 km^{2})
  - Land: 7.03 sq mi (18.20 km^{2})
  - Water: 0.10 sq mi (0.27 km^{2})
- Elevation: 43 ft (13 m)

Population (2020)
  - City: 15,048
  - Estimate (2023): 15,992
  - Density: 2,276/sq mi (878.8/km^{2})
  - Metro: 234,954 (Bellingham metropolitan area) (US: 204th)
  - Metro density: 109.4/sq mi (42.25/km^{2})
- Demonym(s): Ferndaler, Ferndalian
- Time zone: UTC–8 (Pacific (PST))
  - Summer (DST): UTC–7 (PDT)
- ZIP Code: 98248
- Area codes: 360, 564
- FIPS code: 53-23620
- GNIS feature ID: 2410498
- Website: cityofferndale.org

Ferndale is a city in Whatcom County, Washington, United States. The population was 15,048 at the 2020 census. and according to 2023 census estimates, the city is estimated to have a population of 15,992. Ferndale is the second largest city in Whatcom County and is situated near the Lummi Nation within the Bellingham metropolitan area.

== History ==
A Lummi settlement was historically located on a prairie on the east bank of the Ferndale area. Early European settlers call the area near the Nooksack River the "lower crossing" to distinguish it from the principal river crossing at Everson. Billy Clark, a Texan who came to the Northwest during the Gold Rush, was the first European full-time resident of what eventually became the city of Ferndale. He lived here with his wife and family for over a decade. First settled in 1872, Ferndale was given its name because of the ferns that once grew around the original school house. Ferndale was originally called Jam because the town was located next to a log jam on the Nooksack River, but the original schoolteacher decided it needed a more picturesque name. Ferndale was officially incorporated on March 19, 1907.

== Geography ==
According to the United States Census Bureau, the city has a total area of 7.14 square miles (18.49 km^{2}), of which 7.03 square miles (18.21 km^{2}) is land and 0.11 square miles (0.28 km^{2}) is water. Downtown Ferndale is located near the river, along with Griffintown and a largely industrial area east of the Nooksack River. Northwest of these areas are suburban developments. Ferndale borders Hovander Homestead Park and Tennant Lake along its southeast boundary.

Downtown Ferndale is built largely on alluvium from the river, while in other parts the rock beneath is glacial in origin, from the Fraser glaciation.

=== Climate ===
Ferndale experiences a mild climate, with no average monthly temperatures above 71.6 °F (22.0 °C). Although Ferndale has slightly higher average wind speeds for much of the year, average temperatures, cloud cover and rainfall are similar to other lowland communities in western Whatcom County, such as Bellingham and Lynden. Ferndale averages slightly less snow than Lynden.

== Demographics ==
Historical population
Census	Pop.	Note	%±
1910	691		—
1920	759		9.8%
1930	752		−0.9%
1940	717		−4.7%
1950	979		36.5%
1960	1,442		47.3%
1970	2,164		50.1%
1980	3,855		78.1%
1990	5,398		40.0%
2000	8,758		62.2%
2010	11,415		30.3%
2020	15,048		31.8%
2023 (est.)	15,992		6.3%
U.S. Decennial Census; 2020 Census

=== 2020 census ===
As of the 2020 census, there were 15,048 people, 5,385 households, and 3,911 families residing in the city.

The median age was 35.6 years; 25.7% of residents were under the age of 18 and 14.0% were 65 years of age or older. For every 100 females there were 94.5 males, and for every 100 females age 18 and over there were 91.7 males age 18 and over.

99.6% of residents lived in urban areas, while 0.4% lived in rural areas.

There were 5,385 households in Ferndale, of which 38.9% had children under the age of 18 living in them. Of all households, 53.5% were married-couple households, 14.3% were households with a male householder and no spouse or partner present, and 24.2% were households with a female householder and no spouse or partner present. About 20.0% of all households were made up of individuals and 8.8% had someone living alone who was 65 years of age or older.

There were 5,553 housing units, of which 3.0% were vacant. The homeowner vacancy rate was 1.3% and the rental vacancy rate was 1.9%.

Racial composition as of the 2020 census
Race	Number	Percent
White	10,780	71.6%
Black or African American	164	1.1%
American Indian and Alaska Native	376	2.5%
Asian	1,019	6.8%
Native Hawaiian and Other Pacific Islander	97	0.6%
Some other race	1,058	7.0%
Two or more races	1,554	10.3%
Hispanic or Latino (of any race)	2,229	14.8%

=== 2010 census ===
As of the 2010 census, there were 11,415 people, 4,210 households, and 3,025 families residing in the city. The population density was 1,726.1 inhabitants per square mile (666.5/km^{2}). There were 4,428 housing units at an average density of 669.9 per square mile (258.6/km^{2}). The racial makeup of the city was 83.1% (9,490) White, 1.0% (117) African American, 2.6% (292) Native American, 3.6% (416) Asian, 0.2% (26) Pacific Islander, 5.2% (599) from other races, and 4.2% (475) from two or more races. Hispanic or Latino of any race were 12.0% (1,374) of the population.

There were 4,210 households, of which 40.8% had children under the age of 18 living with them, 53.7% were married couples living together, 13.6% had a female householder with no husband present, 4.6% had a male householder with no wife present, and 28.1% were non-families. 22.7% of all households were made up of individuals, and 9.5% had someone living alone who was 65 years of age or older. The average household size was 2.71 and the average family size was 3.20.

The median age in the city was 34.2 years. 29.1% of residents were under the age of 18; 8.6% were between the ages of 18 and 24; 27.2% were from 25 to 44; 24% were from 45 to 64; and 10.9% were 65 years of age or older. The gender makeup of the city was 48.6% male and 51.4% female.

As of 2010 the median household income in the city was $52,831, and the median income for a family was $64,638. Males had a median income of $47,917 versus $37,447 for females. The per capita income for the city was $23,837. About 13.3% of families and 16.8% of the population were below the poverty line, including 24.2% of those under age 18 and 7.3% of those age 65 or over.

== Economy ==
Originally, Ferndale's economy was based on timber, and shortly after, agriculture of the surrounding land. Dairy processing was a significant employer for the town, and the old Carnation dairy plant has since been converted to offices. The construction of the Ferndale Refinery west of town in the 1950s caused a population boom in the town. The Cherry Point Refinery was constructed to the northwest in the 1970s. A shoe manufacturing plant for Brooks Sports, capable of producing 500,000 pairs of shoes annually, resides in the city. On April 22, 2020, Alcoa announced plans to close the Intalco aluminum smelter, located five miles away, laying off 700 workers. The city also serves as a bedroom community for Bellingham.

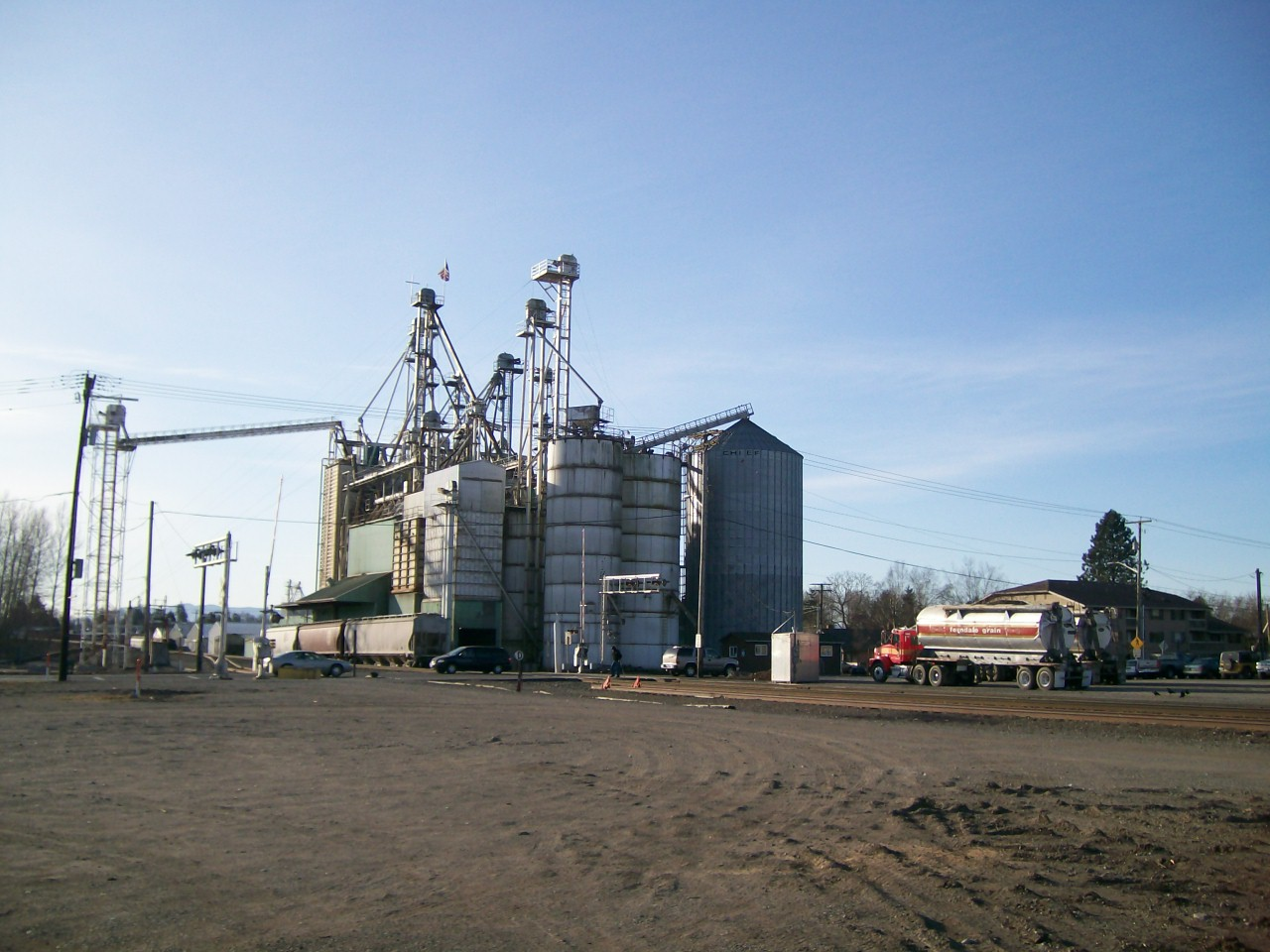
Grain storage and rail line

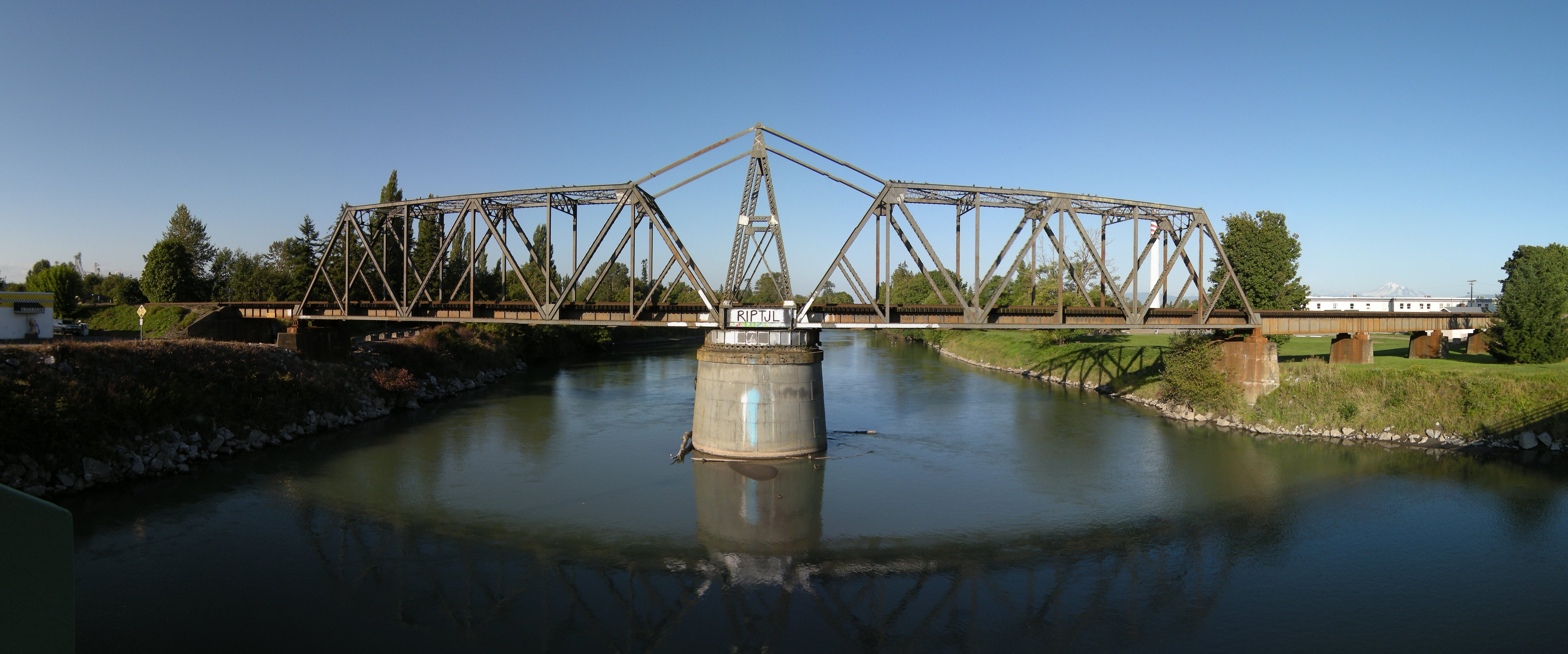
Rail bridge over the Nooksack River

== Transportation ==
The main highway serving Ferndale is Interstate 5. The town is also bisected by the BNSF Railway, which provides freight service and carries Amtrak Cascades passenger trains.

== Education ==
The majority of the city is served by the Ferndale School District. A small piece in the south extends into the Bellingham School District.

== Sister city ==
Ferndale has the following sister city relationship:

- Minamibōsō, Chiba Prefecture, Japan

== Notable people ==
- Jesse Brand – Nashville songwriter, musician, and actor
- Dennis Erickson – Retired college football and NFL head coach
- Sky Hopinka - Filmmaker, MacArthur grant recipient, poet
- Michael Koenen – Former punter for the Tampa Bay Buccaneers
- Wendy B. Lawrence – Former NASA astronaut.
- Jake Locker – Former NFL quarterback for the Tennessee Titans
- Daran Norris – actor and voice actor best known for voice roles in The Fairly OddParents franchise
- Doug Pederson – Former NFL quarterback, coach of the Jacksonville Jaguars
