= KGMI =

Radio station in Bellingham, Washington

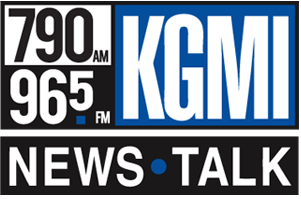
- Bellingham, Washington; United States
- Broadcast area: Whatcom County
- Frequency: 790 kHz
- Branding: 790 - 96.5 KGMI

Programming
- Format: News/talk
- Network: ABC News Radio
- Affiliations: Compass Media Networks; Premiere Networks; Salem Radio Network

Ownership
- Owner: Saga Communications; (Saga Broadcasting, LLC)
- Sister stations: KAFE; KISM; KPUG

History
- First air date: 1926 (as KVOS, in Seattle; moved to Bellingham in 1927)
- Former call signs: KVOS (1926–1962)

Technical information
- Licensing authority: FCC
- Facility ID: 34467
- Class: B
- Power: 5,000 watts day; 1,000 watts night
- Transmitter coordinates: 48°43′18.39″N 122°26′47.6″W
- Translator: 96.5 K243BX (Bellingham)
- Repeater: (92.9-2) KISM-HD2 (Bellingham)

Links
- Public license information: Public file; LMS
- Webcast: Listen Live
- Website: www.mybellinghamnow.com

KGMI (790 AM) is a commercial radio station in Bellingham, Washington, United States. The station is owned by Saga Communications, dba PNW Media Group. It airs a news/talk radio format. KGMI posts news stories and radio recordings on their website, MyBellinghamNow.com or My Bellingham Now.

KGMI serves Northwest Washington with a signal that reaches into much of Southwestern British Columbia, including Greater Vancouver and Victoria. The signal also reaches into Seattle's northern suburbs, as well as the Olympic Peninsula. Its transmitter is off Yew Street Road in Bellingham.

By day, the station transmits with 5,000 watts. To protect other stations on AM 790, it reduces power at night to 1,000 watts and uses a directional antenna after sunset. Programming is also heard on a 250-watt FM translator station, K243BX, on 96.5 MHz.

== History ==
=== Early years ===
The station was first licensed in 1926. It originally broadcast from Seattle using the call sign KVOS, and was owned by Lou Kessler. The station moved to Bellingham a year later, making it the second oldest Washington radio station north of Seattle, after KRKO in Everett. In 1928, Aberdeen businessman Rogan Jones bought the station.

In 1933, Jones began airing news bulletins from the Associated Press under the moniker "Newspaper of the Air". The AP obtained a restraining order, but federal judge John Clyde Bowen refused to grant a permanent injunction, saying that news reports belong to the public. Bowen's decision was reversed on appeal, prompting Jones to appeal to the Supreme Court. In 1936, the Supreme Court threw out the restraining order on the grounds that since the AP was a nonprofit organization, it could not incur damages. The case established that radio (and later, television) stations had the same right to news reports as newspapers.

The station broadcast on several different frequencies during its early years. In 1935, it was located on 1200 kilocycles, transmitting with 100 watts, the only radio station between Everett and Vancouver. In 1941, the North American Regional Broadcasting Agreement (NARBA) established new frequencies for many of the early radio stations. KVOS moved to its current frequency of 790 kHz, with 250 watts.

=== TV and FM stations ===
In 1953, Jones signed on the area's first television station, KVOS-TV. He sold it in 1962, but kept the radio station. Due to Federal Communications Commission (FCC) rules at the time regarding separately owned stations not sharing the same call letters, the TV station remained KVOS-TV, while the radio station changed its call sign to the current KGMI. In March 1960, Jones added an FM station on 92.9 MHz, KGMI-FM, which is now KISM.

Jones remained the owner until his death in 1972. In 1998, Saga Communications purchased KGMI and KISM for $9.8 million.

== Programming ==
Weekdays begin with a local news and information show, The KGMI Morning News featuring Dianna Hawryluk and Adam Smith. There is also a news hour during afternoon drive time, anchored by Kathi O'Shea. Joe Teehan hosts KGMI Konnects, a live call-in show, ahead of the evening news hour. The rest of the weekday schedule is made up of syndicated talk programs, including "Markley, Van Camp, and Robbins", The Lars Larson Show, Coast To Coast AM with George Noory and This Morning, America's First News with Gordon Deal.

Weekends feature shows on money, health, gardening, farming, car repair, home repair, real estate and technology, some of which are paid brokered programming. Weekend syndicated programs include The Kim Komando Show, Rich DeMuro on Tech and Rudy Maxa World Travel. Most hours begin with an update from ABC News Radio.

== Translator ==
Call sign	Frequency	City of license	FID	ERP (W)	Class	Transmitter coordinates	FCC info
K243BX	96.5 FM	Bellingham, Washington	144175	250	D	48°46′33.4″N 122°26′29.6″W	LMS
