= Harry A. Binzer =

American politician

Harry A. Binzer (December 26, 1897 – June 17, 1959) was a member of the Washington State Senate.

== Career ==
Binzer was a member of the State Senate in 1947. He was a Republican.
