= Washington's 42nd legislative district =

Coordinates: 48°45′N 121°39′W

Map of Washington's 42nd legislative district

Washington's 42nd legislative district is one of forty-nine districts in Washington state for representation in the state legislature.

The current state senator is Sharon Shewmake. The district's state representatives are Alicia Rule (D; position 1), and Joe Timmons (D; position 2).

== List of senators representing the district ==
Senator	Party	Term
District established January 1, 1903.
John Earles	Democratic	1903 – 1907
Robert L. Kline	Republican	1907 – 1911
Henry M. White	Democratic	1911 – 1915
Edward J. Cleary (Bellingham)	Republican	1915 – 1935
S. C. Roland	Democratic	1935 – 1939
Thomas Voyce	Democratic	1939 – 1943
Harry A. Binzer	Republican	1943 – 1944 (Resigned to enter military service)
Ralph C. Tenney	Republican	February 15, 1944 – 1945 (Resigned)
Thomas R. Waters	Democratic	1945 – 1947 (Elected to serve unexpired term)
Harry A. Binzer	Republican	1947 – 1951
Vaughan Brown	Democratic	1951 – 1955
Homer O. Nunamaker (Bellingham)	Democratic	January 10, 1955 – January 14, 1963
R. Frank Atwood	Republican	1963 – 1975
Barney Goltz	Democratic	1975 – 1987
Ann Anderson (Acme)	Republican	1987 – September 15, 1998 (Resigned due to appointment to Tax Appeals Board)
Joe Elenbaas	Republican	November 10, 1998 – November 23, 1998 (Appointed)
Georgia Gardner	Democratic	November 23, 1998 – January 2003
Dale Brandland (Bellingham)	Republican	January 13, 2003 – January 10, 2011
Doug Ericksen (Ferndale)	Republican	January 13, 2011 – December 17, 2021 (Died in office)
Simon Sefzik (Ferndale)	Republican	January 11, 2022 – December 9, 2022 (Appointed)
Sharon Shewmake (Bellingham)	Democratic	December 9, 2022 – present

== List of representatives representing the district ==
G. E. DeSteiguer (R), Edmond S. Meany (R)

1893 Edmond S. Meany (R), L. H. Wheeler (R)

1895 Solon T. Williams (R), R. B. Albertson (R)

1897 Hans Hansen (Pop.), Solon T. Williams (Silver Rep.)

1899 Charles S. Gleason (R), L. W. Carpenter (R)

1901 R. B. Albertson (Speaker) (R), Frederick Burch (R)

1903 Edgar C. Raine (R), Dr. C. S. Emery (R)

1905 David McVay (R), Gerhardt Ericksen (R)

1907 W. F. Freudenberg (R), W. C. McMaster (R)

1909 W. C. McMaster (R), Walter T. Christensen (R)

1911 Walter T. Christensen (R), Edgar J. Wright (R)

1913 Walter T. Christensen (Prog.), Thomas F. Murphine (Prog.)

1915 Thomas F. Murphine (Prog.), W. D. Lane (Prog.)

1917 Frank E. Boyle (R), Walter T. Christensen (R)

1919 George N. Hodgdon (D), H. C. Bohlke (D)

1921 Thomas F. Murphine (R), George T. Ericksen (R)

1923 William Phelps Totten (R), Thomas F. Murphine (R)

1925 Elmer Ellsworth Shields (R), William Phelps Totten (R)

1927 Elmer Ellsworth Shields (R), E. L. Howard (R)

1929 William Phelps Totten (R), M. B. Mitchell (R)

1931 M. B. Mitchell (R), E. L. Howard (R)

1933 Tim Healy (R), Charles I. Roth (R)

1935 James D. McDonald (D), Thomas Voyce (D)

1937 James D. McDonald (D), Thomas Voyce (D)

1939 James D. McDonald (D), B. F. Reno Jr. (R)

1941 B. F. Reno Jr. (R), Charles F. Trunkey (R)

1943 Homer O. Nunamaker (D), Percy Willoughby (D)

1945 Homer O. Nunamaker (D), Percy Willoughby (D)

1947 Leo C. Goodman (R), Leslie J. Peterson (R)

1949 Vaughan Brown (D), Homer O. Nunamaker (D)

1951 Marshall Forrest (D), Homer O. Nunamaker (D)

1953 Hal G. Arnason Jr (R), Malcolm McBeath (R)

1955 Hal G. Arnason Jr (R), Malcolm McBeath (R)

1957 George G. Dowd (D), Richard J. “Dick” Kink (D)

1959 A. E. Edwards (D), Richard J. “Dick” Kink (D)

1961 A. E. Edwards (D), Richard J. “Dick” Kink (D)

1963 Richard J. “Dick” Kink (D), Charles E. Lind (R)

1965 Richard J. “Dick” Kink (D), W. O. E. Radcliffe (D)

1967 Dr. Caswell J. Farr (R), Richard J. “Dick” Kink (D), Fred A. Veroske (R)

1969 Dr. Caswell J. Farr (R), Richard J. “Dick” Kink (D), Fred A. Veroske (R)

1971 Dr. Caswell J. Farr (R), Donald G. Hansey (R), Dan Van Dyk (D)

1973 H. A. “Barney” Goltz (D), Dan Van Dyk (D)

1975 Mary Kay Becker (D), Art Moreau (D)

1977 Mary Kay Becker (D), Art Moreau (D)

1979 Mary Kay Becker (D), Roger Van Dyken (R)

1981 Mary Kay Becker (D), Roger Van Dyken (R)

1983 Dennis Braddock (D), Roger Van Dyken (R)

1985 Dennis Braddock (D), Pete Kremen (D)

1987 Dennis Braddock (D), Pete Kremen (D)

1989 Dennis Braddock (D), Pete Kremen (D)

1991 Dennis Braddock (D), Pete Kremen (D)

1993 Kelli Linville (D), Pete Kremen (D)

1995 Gene Goldsmith (R), Pete Kremen (resigned December 9, 1995; elected Whatcom County Executive) (D), Kelli Linville (appointed December 12, 1995 to serve unexpired term) (D)

1997 Georgia Anne Gardner (D), Kelli Linville (D)

1999 Doug Ericksen (R), Kelli Linville (D)

2001 Doug Ericksen (R), Kelli Linville (D)

2003 Doug Ericksen (R), Kelli Linville (D)

2005 Doug Ericksen (R), Kelli Linville (D)

2007 Doug Ericksen (R), Kelli Linville (D)

2009 Doug Ericksen (R), Kelli Linville (D)

2011 Jason Overstreet (R), Vincent Buys (R)

2013 Jason Overstreet (R), Vincent Buys (R)

2015 Luanne Van Werven (R), Vincent Buys (R)

2017 Luanne Van Werven (R), Vincent Buys (R)

2019 Luanne Van Werven (R), Sharon Shewmake (D)

2021 Alicia Rule (D), Sharon Shewmake (D)

2023 Alicia Rule (D), Joe Timmons (D)

== See also ==
- Washington Redistricting Commission
- Washington State Legislature
- Washington State Senate
- Washington House of Representatives
