= List of provincial parks of the Lower Mainland =

The list of provincial parks of the Lower Mainland contains the provincial parks located within this geographic region of the province of British Columbia. It includes parks from the two regional districts of Fraser Valley and Metro Vancouver. These parks are administered by BC Parks under the jurisdiction of the Ministry of Environment and Climate Change Strategy.

== Parks ==
=== Fraser Valley Regional District ===
Name	Established	Commons category	Picture	Coordinates
Alexandra Bridge Provincial Park	1984-07-26	Alexandra Bridge (1926)		49.7°N 121.4°W
Bridal Veil Falls Provincial Park	1965	Bridal Veil Falls Provincial Park		49.1833°N 121.733°W
Cascade Recreation Area				49.2667°N 120.933°W
Chilliwack Lake Provincial Park	1973			49.0417°N 121.411°W
Chilliwack River Provincial Park	1961			49.08°N 121.886°W
Coquihalla Canyon Provincial Park	1986-05-15	Coquihalla Canyon Provincial Park		49.3703°N 121.369°W
Coquihalla River Provincial Park	1986			49.461°N 121.26°W
Cultus Lake Provincial Park	1948-02-10			49.036388888889°N 121.97444444444°W
Davis Lake Provincial Park	1963	Davis Lake Provincial Park		49.3°N 122.233°W
E. C. Manning Provincial Park	1941	Manning Park		49.0667°N 120.783°W
Emory Creek Provincial Park	1956			49.5167°N 121.417°W
F. H. Barber Provincial Park	1978			49.314°N 121.6349°W
Ferry Island Provincial Park	1963			49.2017°N 121.7815°W
Kilby Provincial Park	1973-08-28	Kilby Store and Farm		49.2375°N 121.961°W
Mehatl Creek Provincial Park	1997			50.05°N 122.033°W
Nicolum River Provincial Park	1956			49.3667°N 121.342°W
Rolley Lake Provincial Park	February 3, 1961			49.243°N 122.387°W
Sasquatch Provincial Park	1968			49.35°N 121.7°W
Silver Lake Provincial Park	February 1964			49.3167°N 121.4°W
Skagit Valley Provincial Park	1973	Skagit Valley Provincial Park		49.1167°N 121.167°W

=== Metro Vancouver ===
#	Name	Established	Commons category	Picture	Coordinates
1	Apodaca Provincial Park				49.3545°N 123.3398°W
2	Cypress Provincial Park	1975	Cypress Provincial Park		49.3917°N 123.213°W
3	Golden Ears Provincial Park	1967-12-14	Golden Ears Provincial Park		49.4667°N 122.45°W
4	Indian Arm Provincial Park	1995			49.43333333°N 122.86666667°W
5	Mount Seymour Provincial Park	1936			49.385°N 122.935°W
6	Peace Arch Park		Peace Arch Park		49°N 122.757°W
7	Pinecone Burke Provincial Park				49.3933°N 122.707°W
