= Hatzic =

Historic community in Central Fraser Valley, British Columbia, Canada

Coordinates: 49°09′00″N 122°15′00″W

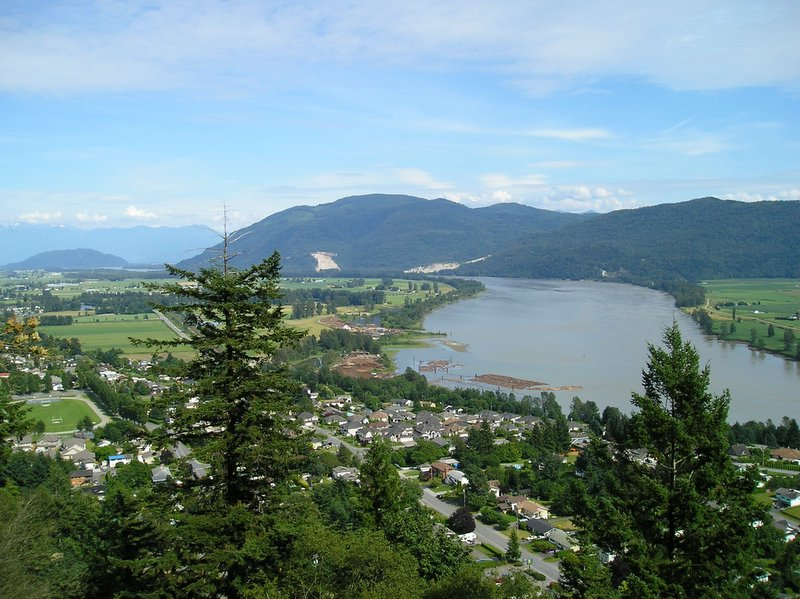
Overlooking Hatzic from a cliff on the grounds of Westminster Abbey

Hatzic is a historic community in the Central Fraser Valley region of the Lower Mainland of British Columbia, Canada, located on the east side of the City of Mission and including areas beyond the municipal boundary to the east and northeast.

Hatzic is the location of two very important historical sites in British Columbia, the mission school of the Oblate Fathers (OMI), St. Mary's Indian Residential School, the name sake of the City of Mission, and X̱á:ytem, an archaeological site and museum dating back over 9,000 years. X̱á:ytem is a National Heritage Site of Canada. Also notable is Ferncliff Gardens, a private floral operation now becoming a heritage site. Hatzic Slough, which is part of the drainage for the oxbow Hatzic Lake, is the site of one of the world's largest dry-sorting yards for raw timber. A former railway station named Hatzic was located between the outlet of Hatzic Lake and the foot of the rise to the benchland where most of residential Hatzic is today.

Mission's Fraser River Heritage Park is to the west and incorporates lands formerly belonging to the Oblate mission, including the foundations of the original school, though it is accessed from Mission proper, not via Hatzic.

Hatzic is one of Mission's older suburban neighbourhoods and is home to Hatzic Middle School and various elementary schools. Overlooking it from above is Westminster Abbey, a Benedictine monastery established in the 1950s, which is part of the Ferndale neighbourhood of Mission. Across the floodplain from the benchland Hatzic proper overlooks and, where Hatzic Valley is located, lies the community of Dewdney, standing astride the bridge where British Columbia Highway 7 leads onto Nicomen Island. Across the Fraser River from Hatzic is the northeast sector of Matsqui Prairie.

== Climate ==
Hatzic has an oceanic climate (Köppen climate type Cfb). The average annual precipitation is 1,883.3 mm (74.15 in). Extremes vary from −21.7 °C (−7.1 °F), recorded on December 29, 1968 to 35.0 °C (95.0 °F), recorded on August 8, 1978.

Climate data for Hatzic (Mission West Abbey) (Elevation: 197m) 1981−2010
Month	Jan	Feb	Mar	Apr	May	Jun	Jul	Aug	Sep	Oct	Nov	Dec	Year
Record high °C (°F)	16.5 (61.7)	18.9 (66.0)	24.0 (75.2)	28.0 (82.4)	34.0 (93.2)	32.5 (90.5)	35.0 (95.0)	35.0 (95.0)	33.5 (92.3)	26.0 (78.8)	17.8 (64.0)	16.5 (61.7)	35.0 (95.0)
Mean daily maximum °C (°F)	5.6 (42.1)	7.6 (45.7)	10.4 (50.7)	13.6 (56.5)	16.8 (62.2)	19.5 (67.1)	22.4 (72.3)	22.9 (73.2)	19.8 (67.6)	13.7 (56.7)	7.9 (46.2)	5.0 (41.0)	13.8 (56.8)
Daily mean °C (°F)	3.3 (37.9)	4.6 (40.3)	6.9 (44.4)	9.6 (49.3)	12.7 (54.9)	15.3 (59.5)	17.8 (64.0)	18.3 (64.9)	15.6 (60.1)	10.6 (51.1)	5.5 (41.9)	2.8 (37.0)	10.3 (50.5)
Mean daily minimum °C (°F)	0.9 (33.6)	1.6 (34.9)	3.3 (37.9)	5.5 (41.9)	8.5 (47.3)	11.1 (52.0)	13.3 (55.9)	13.6 (56.5)	11.3 (52.3)	7.4 (45.3)	3.1 (37.6)	0.5 (32.9)	6.7 (44.1)
Record low °C (°F)	−15.6 (3.9)	−18.0 (−0.4)	−10.0 (14.0)	−1.1 (30.0)	0.0 (32.0)	4.0 (39.2)	6.5 (43.7)	7.2 (45.0)	1.7 (35.1)	−9.0 (15.8)	−18.0 (−0.4)	−21.7 (−7.1)	−21.7 (−7.1)
Average precipitation mm (inches)	253.4 (9.98)	160.6 (6.32)	168.6 (6.64)	151.7 (5.97)	129.9 (5.11)	107.5 (4.23)	70.7 (2.78)	62.5 (2.46)	88.8 (3.50)	190.0 (7.48)	288.6 (11.36)	211.2 (8.31)	1,883.3 (74.15)
Average rainfall mm (inches)	230.6 (9.08)	147.2 (5.80)	161.2 (6.35)	149.9 (5.90)	129.9 (5.11)	107.5 (4.23)	70.7 (2.78)	62.5 (2.46)	88.8 (3.50)	189.9 (7.48)	279.8 (11.02)	191.0 (7.52)	1,808.7 (71.21)
Average snowfall cm (inches)	22.9 (9.0)	13.4 (5.3)	7.4 (2.9)	1.8 (0.7)	0.0 (0.0)	0.0 (0.0)	0.0 (0.0)	0.0 (0.0)	0.0 (0.0)	0.2 (0.1)	8.7 (3.4)	20.3 (8.0)	74.6 (29.4)
Average precipitation days (≥ 0.2 mm)	20.2	15.9	18.7	17.8	16.0	14.1	8.9	8.0	10.3	16.8	21.0	18.8	186.5
Average rainy days (≥ 0.2 mm)	18.0	14.4	18.1	17.8	16.0	14.1	8.9	8.0	10.3	16.8	20.2	16.7	179.3
Average snowy days (≥ 0.2 cm)	3.7	2.5	1.5	0.31	0.0	0.0	0.0	0.0	0.0	0.04	1.6	3.9	13.55
Source: Environment Canada (normals, 1981−2010)

== Related names and local geography ==
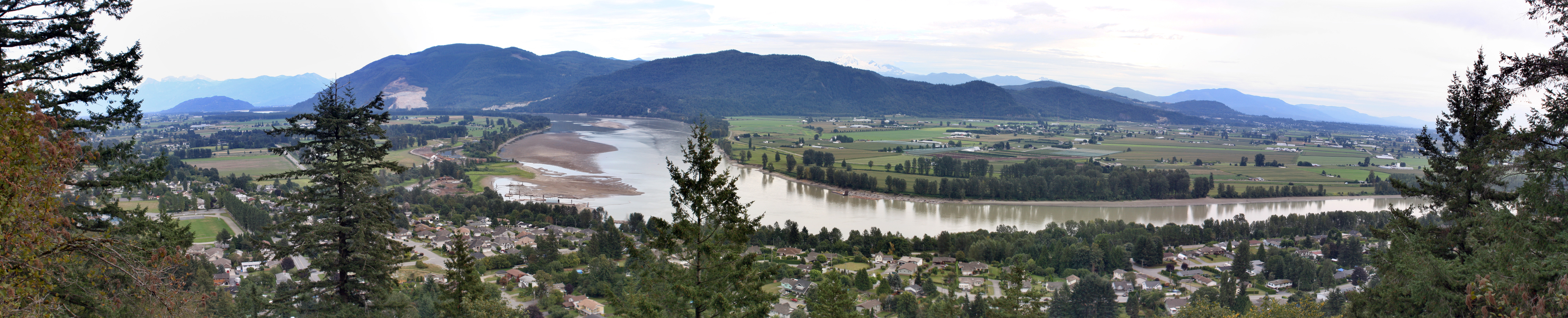
A wider view of residential Hatzic from the same cliff at Westminster Abbey.

Related names, which more or less are also considered part of Hatzic, are Hatzic Island, which is in the centre of Hatzic Lake, north of which are the farming communities of Hatzic Prairie and Durieu, which together form part of the Hatzic Valley, along with communities to the north of Hatzic Prairie around Allan Lake, McConnell Creek and Miracle Valley. The Hatzic Valley forms the southern portion of Electoral Area 'F' of the Fraser Valley Regional District and comprises the old course of the Stave River's glacier and its terminal moraine at the north end of the valley, most of which is fertile floodplain.
