= Dewdney =

Dewdney may refer to:

== Places in Canada ==
Some or all of these places are named for Edgar Dewdney, an Englishman who moved to British Columbia as a road and rail surveyor and was later a politician in British Columbia and in what is now Saskatchewan.

- Dewdney (electoral district), a former electoral district in British Columbia
- Dewdney, British Columbia, an unincorporated community, formerly a district municipality, in the Fraser Valley of British Columbia
- Dewdney Trail, a colonial-era route across southern British Columbia
- Dewdney Trunk Road, one of the earliest main roads in the Lower Mainland of British Columbia
- Dewdney-Alouette Regional District, a former regional district in British Columbia
- Regina Dewdney, a federal electoral district in Regina, Saskatchewan
- Dewdney Avenue, a main collector roadway in Regina, Saskatchewan
