= Cascade Falls Regional Park =

Park in British Columbia, Canada

Coordinates: 49.2746°N 122.2144°W

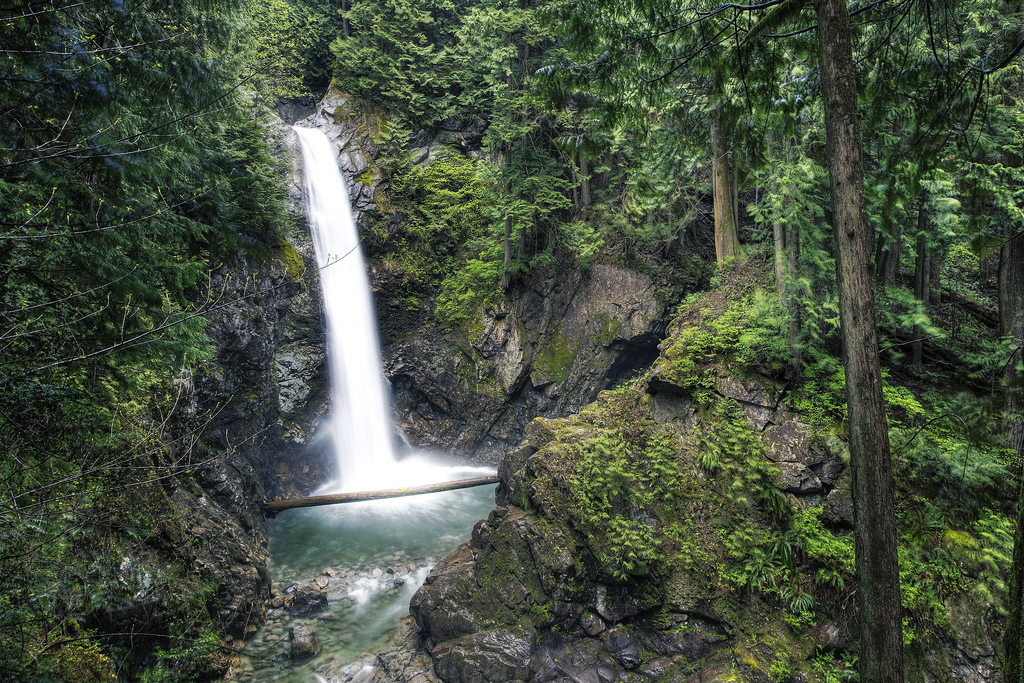
- A waterfall in the park
- Interactive map of Cascade Falls Regional Park
- Location: Hatzic Valley, British Columbia, Canada
- Area: 22 hectares (54 acres)
- Created: June 7, 1986
- Operator: Fraser Valley Regional District

Cascade Falls Regional Park is a regional park under the administration of the Fraser Valley Regional District in the Hatzic Valley of the Lower Mainland region of British Columbia, Canada. The park was originally 9.5 hectares in area but was expanded to a current 22 hectares. It has picnic tables and pit toilets, with various hiking trails and a walkway leading to a viewing platform over a large waterfall, which is 15 minutes walk from the park's parking lot.

The falls and their associated park have the following features:

- 30-metre waterfall
- Suspension bridge spanning Cascade Creek
- Viewing platforms on either side of the suspension bridge
- 1.2 km trail featuring stairs through coniferous forest
- Small run of waterfalls dropping 18 metres into tranquil lower pools

It is located in the McConnell Creek area northeast of Mission. Cascade Creek was formerly named McConnell Creek, after a logger in the area called Jack McConnell, who in fact had changed his name from John Connell further to the failure of his logging business. Cascade Creek drains into the southeast end of Stave Lake southwest of Davis Lake Provincial Park.

The park was first proposed in 1984 via studies commissioned by the Dewdney-Alouette Regional District and officially inaugurated on June 7, 1986. The park is open from 7AM till sunset, throughout the year.

Cascade Falls was featured in the final scene of the film Big Bully, as the location of a fight between characters played by Tom Arnold and Rick Moranis. It was also featured in the Twilight Movie, Breaking Dawn Part 2, during the Race Through The Forest scene.

== See also ==
- List of waterfalls in British Columbia
- List of filming locations in the Vancouver area
- Hiking to Cascade Falls
- The hidden natural waterslide above the falls
