= Hatzic Island =

Island in Mission, British Columbia, Canada

Coordinates: 49.167°N 122.239°W

Hatzic Island is an island located in the centre of Hatzic Lake, an oxbow lake formation north of the Fraser River, on the east side of Mission, British Columbia, Canada.

== Geography ==
Approximately 2.6 km in length from North to South and just over 600m wide at its widest point, the island is a pointed oval shape, located just above sea level. The island and its immediate neighbouring communities is accessed exclusively via Shook Street from BC Highway 7, which crosses the southern end of Hatzic Lake, alongside the mainline of the Canadian Pacific Railway.

The island is unincoporporated, forming part of Fraser Valley Regional District Electoral Area "G". Hatzic Island is a relatively densely populated residential and recreational community. It consists of houses, some smaller farms, privately run campgrounds, mobile home parks and trailer parks, the largest trailer park being the Everglades resort, consisting of nearly four hundred sites on thirty acres on the southeast part of Hatzic Island. Apart from properties on the island itself, there is a residential community immediately adjacent to Hatzic Lake's southwestern shore off Moore Avenue.

The nearest schools are in Hatzic and Dewdney, British Columbia as there are no schools on the island.

== Flooding ==
Because of Hatzic Island's low elevation it is potentially vulnerable to rising sea levels and flooding of the Fraser. Hazards from flooding caused by the annual spring freshet of the Fraser River and winter rainfall outflow from Hatzic Valley have generally been ameliorated by dykes, gates and pump stations which empty Hatzic Lake via its lower slough into the Fraser River. The most serious recorded flooding by the Fraser River of Hatzic Island was the "Great Flood" of 1948 which, further to breaches of the dykes, flooded over 13,000 acres of land in lowland areas adjacent to the Fraser River, extending north over twelve square miles of Hatzic Prairie. One year after the 1948 floods a replacement pumping station was built, with capacity of 8CM (cubic meters) per second. Although this was intended to be temporary, new pumps were not built until 2014, when three new pumps with combined pumping capacity of 14CM/s were fitted. The older pumps are still available as backups. The pumps are powered by electricity, funded by the Dewdney Area Improvement District and their taxpayers, and because of newer gate design and floating pump house construction offer a more fish-friendly and seismically stable solution.

Further to studies on flooding in the Lower Mainland the Fraser Basin Council has embarked on authoring a multi-phase Lower Mainland Flood Management Strategy (LMFMS), the first phase of which completed in 2016, being focussed on "BC Lower Mainland flood scenarios, a regional assessment of flood vulnerabilities and a review of flood protection works and practices in the region." In commenting on the maps published under Phase 1 of the LMFMS, The Hope Standard observed that "the deepest floodwaters would swamp the north and east of Hatzic Lake, in and around Dewdney and Deroche on the north side of the Fraser River, and the Glen Valley in northwest Abbotsford and northeast Langley, where many areas could see flood waters rise three metres or more above ground."

The second phase of the LMFMS program consists of multiple projects, and has the purpose of "developing a long-term strategy", having an expected completion date of late 2020/ early 2021.

== See also ==
- Hatzic Valley
- Hatzic Lake
