= Deroche =

- Location of Deroche in British Columbia
- Coordinates: 49°10′59″N 122°04′04″W
- Country: Canada
- Province: British Columbia
- Region: Fraser Valley
- Regional district: Fraser Valley

Area
  - Total: 4.21 km^{2} (1.63 sq mi)

Population (2021)
  - Total: 141
  - Density: 33.5/km^{2} (86.7/sq mi)
- Time zone: UTC−07:00 (PT)
- Area codes: 604, 778, 236, & 672
- Highways: Highway 7

Deroche is an unincorporated community at the foot of Nicomen Mountain in the Fraser Valley region of southwestern British Columbia. Encompassing the northeastern part of Nicomen Island, the infrastructure is centred on the northern shore of Nicomen Slough. The locality, on BC Highway 7, is by road about 29 kilometres (18 mi) west of Agassiz, 89 kilometres (55 mi) east of Vancouver, and 21 kilometres (13 mi) east of Mission. Deroche is part of the Fraser Valley Regional District Electoral Area G.

== Name origin ==
In the early 1860s, Joseph Deroche, who primarily operated a freight business, discovered Nicomen Island was suitable for wintering his cattle. The first resident on the northern part of the island, his farming involvement gradually increased and freighting phased out. In 1868, he pre-empted 65 hectares (160 acres) but focussed on another property during the late 1870s, which by the 1880s bordered the Nicomen train station.

His main residence was about 1.8 kilometres (1.1 mi) due south of the present bridge.

The early community, which straddled both sides of the slough, was originally called North Nicomen but was renamed Deroche in 1891. Due south, on the southeastern shore of the island, was what would become known as Deroche Landing.

When in his late nineties, Joseph died in 1922.

== Ferry, bridges, and roads ==
By the early 1890s, a steel cable guided the toll ferry across the slough. The site was on the Leqʼ a꞉ mel reserve, and Joe Kelly pulled the raft across by rope.

The 1894 wooden bridge comprised three 13-metre (44 ft) spans, but the approaches required immediate repair after the flood that year. In 1897, the bridge height was raised and the approaches lengthened. This structure was west of the present one.

The 1901 bridge contained a 49-metre (160 ft) Howe truss, three 18-metre (60 ft) A trusses, and thirteen 6.1-metre (20 ft) spans. This bridge was east of the present one. Centre Rd, now called Nicomen Island Trunk Rd, existed by 1908 but seasonally reverted to deep mud.

In 1916, the Dewdney Trunk Road eastward from the Stave River to the Deroche bridge was completed. On the island, the road followed the south bank of the slough.

During the 1920s, a bridge existed at the north end of Johnson Rd, which connected to a quarry. In 1929, Lougheed Highway was built across the island and the slough road abandoned.

In 1932, the Deroche bridge was rebuilt. By 1937, the highway eastward was paved to Deroche.

The replacement bridge built in 1957 was west of the previous structure.

== Earlier community ==
From the late 1880s, new settlers in the eastern Nicomen area were predominantly French-Canadian.

Around 1890, the first Roman Catholic church building was erected on the northeast corner of Cooper Rd and the highway. Ernest DesRochers was the inaugural postmaster 1891–1897. He was a farmer and road worker, who lived near the church. Apart from the Leqʼ a꞉ mel reserve to the west, the main core of Deroche was still undeveloped prior to William Charters receiving the land as part of a Crown grant in 1892. He sold the future townsite to Martha Pickles in 1893.

Norman McLeod was the inaugural teacher 1893–1899 at the one-room school. The building was replaced in 1914 and extended in 1932.

In 1900, the three Cooper brothers, Ashley, Austin, and Charles, arrived in the area. Austin D. Cooper ran a short-lived general store and was postmaster 1901–1902. Charles J. Cooper was postmaster 1903–1947 and opened a large new store by 1906. When Henry and Mary Park joined as partners in 1908, the name changed to the Nicomen Supply Store.

In 1908, the Kelliher Sawmill was established between the Canadian Pacific Railway (CP) track and the bridge, where bunkhouses provided accommodation. That year, the community hall and a Chinese laundry opened. Other businesses followed. In 1909, Charles Cooper subdivided the townsite.

In 1912, P.A. Wilson and M.J. Scanlon purchased the Kelliher Lumber Co mill. They formed Cottonwood Lumber Co., but defaulted on the mortgage in 1915. A dam across the slough held logs. After bankruptcy during World War I, the mill buildings were taken down and machinery removed.

In 1914, Cooper leased the general store/post office to the Murrays. That year, St. Joseph Roman Catholic Church was rebuilt and the Presbyterians acquired the old school building. After moving it northeastward to a new site, services were being held within a couple of years.

The 1917 fire gutted the store, community hall, and several residences. Louisa Cooper rebuilt and ran the store, before leasing the business to C.F. Chamerlayne. By the 1920s, apart from the descendants of a few families, the French-Canadians had left, replaced by Anglophones. By 1922, the community hall had been rebuilt on a new site. Grace Morton operated a small dry goods store from the front of her house 1922–1925. In 1928, St. Stephen's Anglican church was consecrated. About this time, Charles Cooper installed Imperial Oil gas pumps at his store and erected some tourist cabins.

The large mill bunkhouse became the Deroche-Nicomen Farmers' Co-operative Store from the 1920s to the early 1930s. A Shell station opened on the reserve. In 1931, a Home Oil station opened. Murray and Winnefred Smith owned the Cooper store from the mid-1930s to the mid-1940s.

By 1940, the United church (formerly Presbyterian) had closed. Frank and Norah Staines opened the Bi-Rite Store in 1942, which new owner Vic Crosby converted into a coffee bar in 1947. A 1945 fire destroyed the eastern end of the village. On reserve land purchased in 1946, the present community hall opened in 1958. The Bi-Rite reopened before closing finally in 1958. The disused Catholic church was demolished in 1957. The Anglican church closed in 1970.

In 1995, the school was rebuilt.

== Railway ==
During the 1894 flood, the CP track was submerged for miles.

In 1922, a westbound CP passenger train smashed into an automobile on a private railway crossing about 3 kilometres (2 mi) west. Two of Joseph Deroche's adult children were among the six occupants killed.

Prior to highway milk tankers, the station was the collection point for milk and cream churns.

Train Timetables (Regular stop or Flag stop)
	Mile	1912	1915	1916	1919	1929	1932	1935	1939	1943	1948	1954	1960
Agassiz	58.9	Reg	Both	Reg	Reg	Reg	Both	Reg	Reg	Reg	Reg	Reg	Reg
Harrison Mills	68.1	Both	Both	Both	Reg	Reg	Both	Both	Both	Both	Both	Both	
Deroche	75.4	^{a}		Both	Both	Both	Both	Reg	Both	Both	Both	Flag	
Nicomen ^{b}	76.7	Both	Both	Both	Reg	Both	Both	Flag	Flag	Flag	Flag	Flag	
Dewdney	81.5	Both	Both	Both	Both	Both	Both	Both	Both	Both	Both	Flag	

^a. In 1911, CP erected a section foreman's house and station, described as small. This suggests an unofficial flag stop commenced at the time.

^b. A flag stop opened in 1883, but the line was not completed east to Yale until 1884.

== Later community ==
Census population: Deroche
Year	Pop.	±%
1951	262	—
1956	228	−13.0%
1961	125	−45.2%
1966	155	+24.0%
1971	87	−43.9%
1976	115	+32.2%
1981		—
1986	394	—
1991	238	−39.6%
1996		—
2001		—
2006	139	—
2011*	217	+56.1%
2016	187	−13.8%
2021	141	−24.6%
Source: Statistics Canada * Revised figure

Central infrastructure includes a community hall, general store, garage/gas station, and other small commercial enterprises. In 2016, the Deroche Neighbourhood Plan was published. The Sasquatch Lions run the Deroche Community Hall hosting regular events including poker events funding charitable efforts.

There is a North Fraser Fire Department training facility on the grounds of the Community Hall.

Deroche Elementary, the smallest in School District No. 75 (Mission), totals about 85 students, 65 per cent of whom are First Nations.

In 2011, two Cessna 150s collided in mid-air near Mission. One safely landed, but the other finished upside down in the slough near Deroche, claiming the lives of the pilot and passenger.

In 2015, the Carmel Hill Little Flower Monastery Formation House was built to the north.

== Water supply ==
In 1913, Charles Cooper channelled the first water supply from Burnbrae Creek. During the 1930s, he diverted water from Deroche Creek, which was piped to the village. Halfway down, he installed a hydroelectricity plant. The Deroche water system service area was established in 1992 by the Dewdney-Alouette Regional District, and later became a Fraser Valley Regional District service area after reorganization of regional district boundaries. The water system serves the community of Deroche, which is in Electoral Area G of the regional district. The system was originally operated as a private water system under a Certificate of Public Convenience and Necessity, and was taken over by DARD in 1993. At that time, Deroche Creek was used as the source, but several debris flow incidents within the watershed severely affected the creek, causing interruptions of supply as well as several water quality challenges for the system. As a result, in 1999–2000 several upgrades to the system were carried out. The system was changed over to a groundwater well source, dramatically improving water quality and supply reliability.

== See also ==
- Dewdney
- Lake Errock
