= Assiniboia (disambiguation) =

Assiniboia may refer one of a number of different locations and administrative jurisdictions in Canada. The name is taken from the Assiniboine First Nation, and the Assiniboine River, named for the people.

- Assiniboia refers to either of two historical districts in Canada's North-West Territories.
- Assiniboia, Saskatchewan is a town in south-central Saskatchewan.
- Assiniboia (federal electoral district) was a Canadian federal electoral district in Saskatchewan that was represented in the Canadian House of Commons from 1908 to 1988.
- Assiniboia (provincial electoral district) is the name of a current provincial electoral district in the Canadian province of Manitoba.
- Assiniboia Regional Park, a park in Saskatchewan.
- Assiniboia, Winnipeg, a neighbourhood and former rural municipality in Manitoba

There are also:

- Assiniboia East, a former Canadian federal electoral district
- Assiniboia West, a former Canadian federal electoral district
- the Council of Assiniboia, the appointed administrative body for Rupert's Land which existed from 1821 to 1870
- the Legislative Assembly of Assiniboia, a legislature set up for a provisional government established by Louis Riel from 1869 to 1870
