= Nicomen Mountain =

Mountain in British Columbia, Canada

- Location within British Columbia
- Interactive map of Nicomen Mountain

Highest point
- Elevation: 1,221 m (4,006 ft)
- Coordinates: 49°12′19″N 122°07′13″W

Geography
- Location: British Columbia, Canada
- District: New Westminster Land District
- Parent range: Douglas Ranges
- Topo map: NTS 92G1 Mission

Nicomen Mountain, 1,221 m (4,006 ft), is the southernmost major summit of the Douglas Ranges in the Lower Mainland region of southern British Columbia. It is located to the north of Nicomen Island and the communities of Deroche and Lake Errock.

== See also ==
- Dewdney Peak
