= Central Fraser Valley Regional District =

Coordinates: 49°05′00″N 122°15′00″W

The Central Fraser Valley Regional District was a regional district in the province of British Columbia, Canada, located in the Lower Mainland region, south of the Fraser River and west of Chilliwack. It comprised the Township and City of Langley, the Village of Abbotsford, and the Districts of Matsqui and Sumas, plus adjoining unincorporated areas (Sumas Mountain and Vedder Mountain).

The regional district was abolished in 1995, with the Township and City of Langley being added to an enlarged Greater Vancouver Regional District and Abbotsford, Matsqui and Sumas, now incorporated together as the City of Abbotsford, added to the new Fraser Valley Regional District, which also includes the eastern half of the former Dewdney-Alouette Regional District and all of the former Regional District of Fraser-Cheam.
