= Dewdney, British Columbia =

Dewdney
- Unincorporated community
- Interactive map of Dewdney
- Coordinates: 49°10′00″N 122°12′00″W
- Country: Canada
- Province: British Columbia
- –: Central Fraser Valley
- –: Nicomen Island
- Time zone: UTC−07:00 (PT)

Dewdney, originally named Johnson's Landing from 1884–1892, is an unincorporated community in the Central Fraser Valley of British Columbia, Canada, about 15 km east of the city of Mission. It was incorporated as a district municipality on April 17, 1892, including adjoining areas of Hatzic and Hatzic Island but the anticipated real estate boom on that island did not pan out, and economic damage from the Great Fraser Flood of 1894 led to the municipality's disincorporation on March 12, 1906. Another municipality eastwards, Nicomen, was incorporated in the same year but similarly later disincorporated. Though in the same school district as Mission, it and other adjoining rural areas did not join that municipality when offered. It is now represented as part of Electoral Area 'G' in the regional district government, which currently is the Fraser Valley Regional District.

Dewdney is located at the western end of Nicomen Island, one of the largest settled islands in the Fraser and at the southeast corner of Hatzic Prairie, a lowland floodplain whose the south end includes Hatzic Lake, an oxbow lake with a community of the same name on the island in its centre.

Downtown Dewdney spans the Nicomen Slough, which is fed by Norrish Creek (aka Suicide Creek), one of the main water supplies for the District of Mission. Running east on the north side of the slough is Hawkins Pickle Road, famous mostly for its name. Dewdney has a couple of stores, a post office, the Historic Dewdney Pub (aka "Church of the Blues"), the Dewdney Elementary School which features a Community Outdoor Recreation Education program, and other businesses. It is a service centre for other nearby communities, most of which are more rural in character. Though situated in rich farmland, Dewdney also has a history and continuing economic presence as a lumbering and milling community, as well as fishing and shipping on the river.

Dewdney was the destination of the Dewdney Trunk Road, one of the Fraser Valley's earliest main roads, which ran from Port Moody to Dewdney. The Dewdney Trunk Road, or Dewdney Trunk as it is often called, should not be confused with the Dewdney Trail, which is a colonial-era route from Hope to the East Kootenay region built by Edgar Dewdney. He had been in charge of surveying the site of New Westminster during colonial times and had served on the Legislative Council, the colony's governing body, and as Member of Parliament. The community of Dewdney was named in 1892 when he was appointed Lieutenant-Governor of British Columbia; he had been Lieutenant-Governor of the Northwest Territories from 1881 and federal Minister of the Interior from 1888 to 1892.

== Associated names ==
The community is the namesake of the historical Dewdney provincial electoral district and also of the now-dismantled Dewdney-Alouette Regional District (DARD). Dewdney Peak (locally referred to as Hatzic Mountain) immediately to the community's north was named for the community in 1939, rather than for Edgar Dewdney.

== See also ==
- Deroche, British Columbia
- Durieu, British Columbia
