= Durieu =

Durieu is a French surname and may refer to:

== People ==
- Michel Charles Durieu de Maisonneuve (1796–1878), French soldier and botanist
- Pierre-Paul Durieu (1830–1899), French Roman Catholic missionary
- Jean Louis Marie Eugène Durieu (1800–1874), French photographer

== Places ==
- Durieu, British Columbia, Canada, located northeast of Mission, British Columbia, named for Bishop Durieu.
