= Norrish Creek =

Watercourse in British Columbia, Canada

Coordinates: 49°10′23″N 122°08′07″W

Norrish Creek is a tributary of the Fraser River. It is located in the Douglas Ranges, the southernmost subrange of the Pacific Ranges of the Coast Mountains of British Columbia, Canada to the north of Nicomen Island. Local residents refer to it as "Suicide Creek." It was named after William Henry Norrish a pioneer Scottish Canadian farmer.

== Course ==
Norrish Creek has its source in Dickson Lake, a medium-sized, seldom visited reservoir at the bases of Mount Wardrop and Catherwood. The creek flows alongside Norrish Creek FSR down from its source for much of its length. Its mouth is near Dewdney, which is east of Vancouver in the Lower Fraser Valley. Norrish Creek is fed by many feeder streams along the way.

The creek actually flows into the Nicomen Slough, which is a major slough off the Fraser.

== West Norrish Creek ==
Norrish Creek's west fork has its source in the small Sonny Lake. It flows east from the lake and meets with the mainstream just below the outlet of Dickson Lake.

== Recreation ==
Norrish Creek has small pools for swimming in the lower portion. These are accessible without a vehicle.

The creek has a water treatment plant located at around the 8-kilometre (5 mi) mark.

== Accessibility ==
The mountain ranges along the Lower Fraser Valley experience intense rainfall and heavy snow during the winter. In the winter of 2006–07, 20-to-50-year storms hammered the mainline. Washouts occurred at many locations. The road was initially built to log the valley about 50 years prior to this. Many of the bridges and culverts were deemed unsafe to cross. In 2007 and 2008, the road and many creek crossings were surveyed. Many old wood structures were replaced with CSP's and concrete/ steel composite bridges. The engineering was done by Matt P. Crawford, Civil Engineer Technologist, and Lee Deslauriers, P. Eng, RPF. Construction of the new structures was completed by Brad Beaton.

The forest service road along Norrish Creek is gated and inaccessible to the public. However, during the day, the gates are open for workers and the public can access the road. The area is used by all-terrain vehicles (ATV)s and hunters.

== See also ==
- Pitt River
- Fraser River
- List of rivers of British Columbia
