= F. H. Barber Provincial Park =

Provincial park in British Columbia, Canada

- IUCN category II (national park)
- Location within British Columbia Location within Fraser Valley Regional District
- Interactive map of F. H. Barber Provincial Park
- Location: Fraser Valley RD, British Columbia, Canada
- Coordinates: 49°18′47″N 121°38′05″W
- Area: 8.5 ha (21 acres)
- Established: October 4, 1978
- Governing body: BC Parks

F.H. Barber Provincial Park is a provincial park in British Columbia, Canada. Comprising 8.5 ha of Fraser River floodplain in its natural state, it is one of only two secured public access points to the Fraser between Chilliwack and Hope. It is located at the confluence of Wahleach Creek (Jones Creek) and the Fraser one mile west of Laidlaw, British Columbia and is bounded on the south by the tracks of the Canadian National Railway.
