= William Walter McDonald =

Canadian politician (1844–1929)

William Walter McDonald (July 4, 1844 – June 20, 1929) was a politician from Northwest Territories, Canada who served as a member of the House of Commons of Canada from 1892 to 1896.

== Background ==
McDonald was born in Pigeon Hill, Canada East. He was elected to the House of Commons of Canada in a by-election on November 21, 1892. He was defeated by James Moffat Douglas from the Liberal Party of Canada in the 1896 Canadian federal election after serving just one partial term in office.

By-election on 21 November 1892
Party	Candidate	Votes
Conservative	William Walter McDonald	acclaimed

1896 Canadian federal election: Assiniboia East
Party	Candidate	Votes
Liberal	James Moffat Douglas	3,556
Conservative	William Walter McDonald.	2,502

Parliament of Canada
Preceded by Edgar Dewdney	Member of Parliament Assiniboia East; 1892–1896	Succeeded by James Moffat Douglas
