= Chilliwack River Provincial Park =

Provincial park in British Columbia, Canada

- IUCN category II (national park)
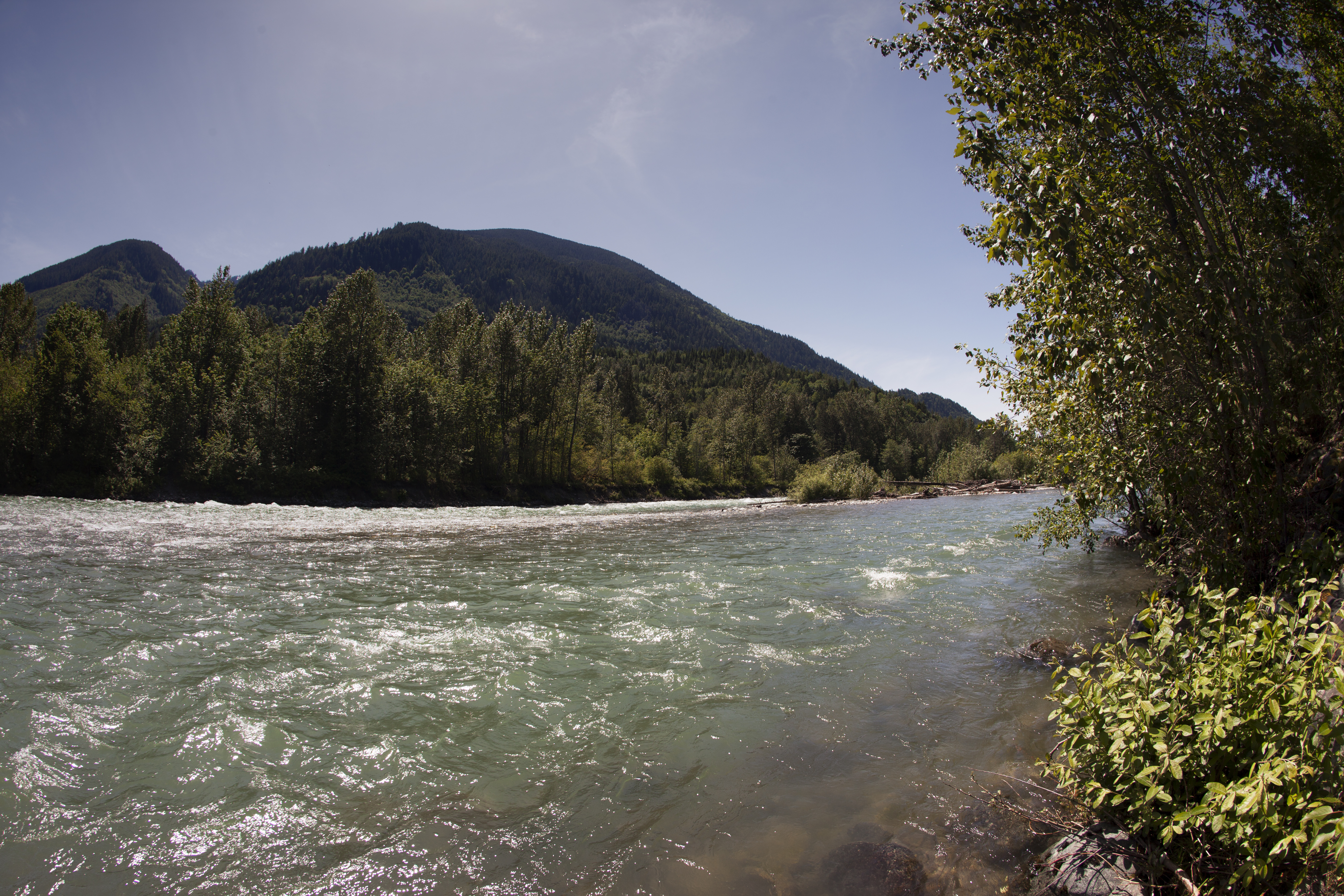
- Chilliwack River

- Location within British Columbia Location within Fraser Valley Regional District
- Interactive map of Chilliwack River Provincial Park
- Location: Fraser Valley, British Columbia, Canada
- Nearest city: Chilliwack
- Coordinates: 49°04′45″N 121°53′08″W
- Area: 23.1 ha (57 acres)
- Established: April 28, 1961
- Governing body: BC Parks

Chilliwack River Provincial Park is a provincial park in British Columbia, Canada, located on the north side of the Chilliwack River to the southeast of the City of Chilliwack in the province's Lower Mainland region.

When first established in 1961, the park comprised approximately 65 acres. Boundaries were decreased in 1970, then increased back to 65 acres later that year. The boundary was redrawn again in 2004, with the park now comprising 21 hectares.
