= Davis Lake Provincial Park =

Park in British Columbia near the town of Mission

- IUCN category II (national park)
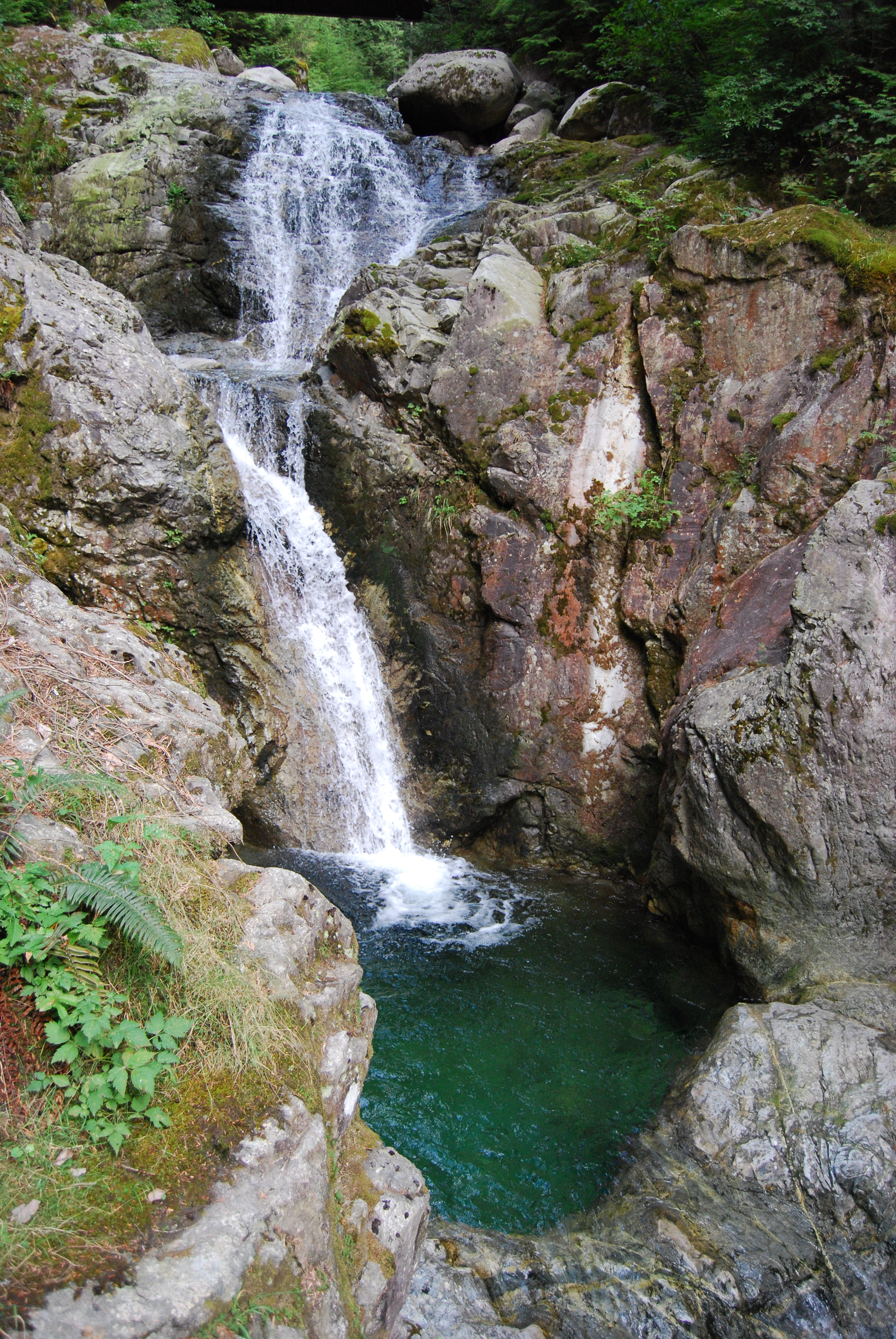
- McDonald Falls

- Location within British Columbia Location within Fraser Valley Regional District
- Interactive map of Davis Lake Provincial Park
- Location: Fraser Valley RD, British Columbia, Canada
- Coordinates: 49°17′51″N 122°14′19″W
- Area: 192 ha (470 acres)
- Established: August 17, 1963
- Governing body: BC Parks

Davis Lake Provincial Park is a 185 acres (0.75 km^{2}) park in British Columbia, Canada, established as a protected provincial park in October 1963. It is located east of the southern end of Stave Lake, northeast of Mission, British Columbia, approximately 18 km north on Sylvester Rd from BC Highway 7. There are campgrounds and beaches at the south end of the lake, access is walk-in only via a 1 km unmaintained gravel road.

The park features bird habitat for sapsuckers, woodpeckers and spotted owls as well as a relatively untouched stand of old growth Western Hemlock.

Davis Lake Provincial Park attractions include:

- canoeing and kayaking, although there are no campsites accessible via kayak or canoe,
- fishing - requiring a fishing permit,
- hiking - in particular to McDonald Falls, on Murdo Creek, accessed downhill from the Lost Creek Forest Service Road (continuation of Sylvester Road) just east of the lake.
- swimming

A 2018 report by the Vancouver Sun indicated that the province had some way to go with urgent need for better park management, in particular in the case of Davis Lake Provincial Park.

== See also ==
- Cascade Falls Regional Park
- Hatzic Valley
