= Silver Lake Provincial Park =

Provincial park in British Columbia, Canada

- IUCN category II (national park)
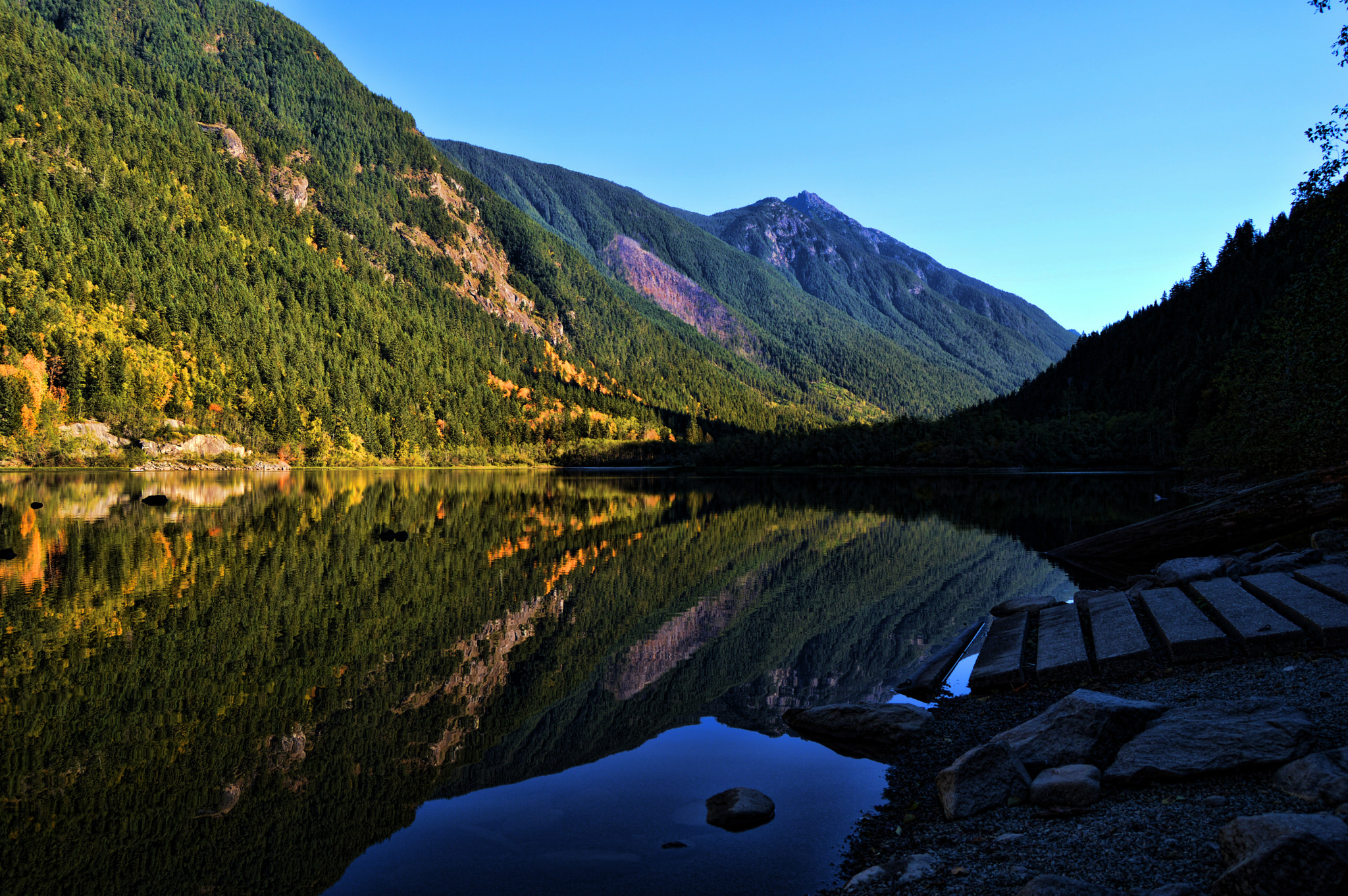
- Silver Lake

- Location within British Columbia Location within Fraser Valley Regional District
- Interactive map of Silver Lake Provincial Park
- Location: Fraser Valley RD, British Columbia, Canada
- Nearest city: Hope
- Coordinates: 49°18′57″N 121°24′49″W
- Area: 77 ha (190 acres)
- Governing body: BC Parks

Silver Lake Provincial Park is a provincial park in British Columbia, Canada, located in the Skagit River Valley just south of Hope and comprising 77 hectares.
