= Hatzic Lake =

Oxbow lake east of Mission, British Columbia

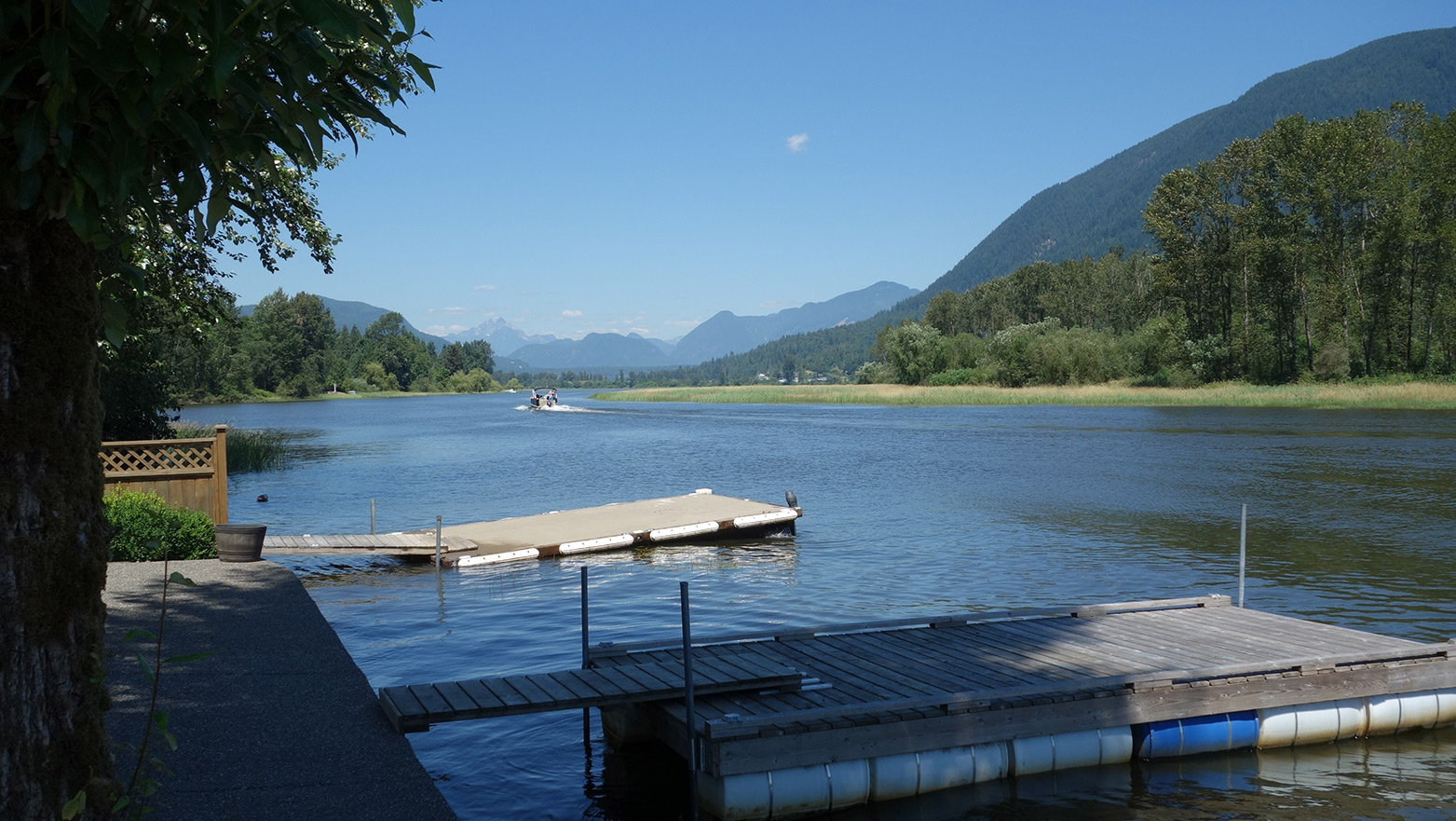
- Hatzic Lake looking north, from east Hatzic Island.

- Location within British Columbia
- Location: East of Mission, British Columbia
- Coordinates: 49°10′30″N 122°14′35″W
- Lake type: oxbow lake
- Basin countries: Canada
- Max. length: 3.7 km (2.3 mi)
- Average depth: 2 m (6 ft 7 in)
- Max. depth: 15 m (49 ft)
- Surface elevation: 0 m (0 ft)
- Islands: 1 (Hatzic Island)

Hatzic Lake is an oxbow lake north of and draining into the Fraser River, immediately south of Hatzic Valley, and east of the benchland neighbourhood of Hatzic.

Neilson Regional Park and the district of Mission is on the immediate west shore of Hatzic Lake, while the centre of the oxbow is Hatzic Island. Northeast of the lake is Dewdney Peak (Hatzic Mountain) which forms the southmost endpoint of the Douglas Ranges. In addition to a large number of private residences the locality has a few commercial campgrounds.

Hatzic Valley's Lagace Creek, Scorey Creek, and Hatzic Slough drain into the northern end of Hatzic Lake, providing it with water. Since these tributaries are intermittent, the water freshness and level of Hatzic Lake can vary seasonally.

The length of the lake, on its north–south axis, is approximately 3.7 km, while Hatzic Island is approximately 2.6 km in length, with the widest parts of the lake off the northern end of the oblong island at about 775 m. The width of the lake inclusive from its extreme west to east is about 2.5 km. BC Highway 7 and the mainline of the Canadian Pacific Railway cross its southern end, just south of the southernmost parts of Hatzic Island.

The depth of the lake is a uniform 2 to 3 meters, except immediately north of Hatzic Island to west of Hatzic Island where depth varies between 3 and 15 meters. Because the lake is surrounded with private residences launch sites for non-residents' boats are limited and smaller boats tend to be launched from Neilson Regional Park or near Hatzic bridge on Lougheed Highway.

Because the lake is very shallow it is warm, and is popular for swimming, water sports and water-skiing. The lake water temperature and farm fertiliser run-off introduced via Scorey Creek has been blamed for invasive flowering rush and algal bloom issues, the latter of which has led to Fraser Health-imposed swimming bans. In 2019 the BC Government funded over a quarter million dollars for addressing invasive plant concerns in Hatzic Lake.

== See also ==
- List of lakes of British Columbia
