= James Moffat Douglas =

Canadian politician

The Honourable James Moffat Douglas
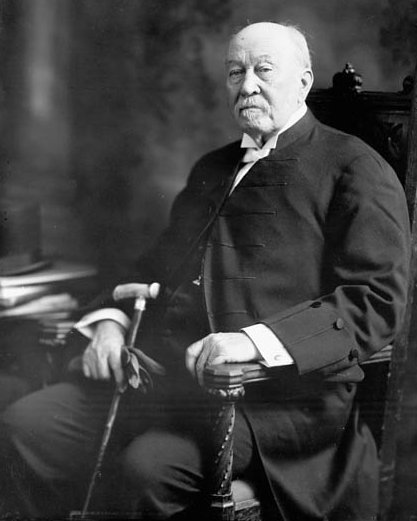

Member of Parliament for Assiniboia East
- In office 1896–1904
- Preceded by: William Walter McDonald
- Succeeded by: John Gillanders Turriff

Canadian Senator from Saskatchewan
- In office 1906–1920
- Appointed by: Wilfrid Laurier

Personal details
- Born: May 26, 1839 Linton, Scotland
- Died: August 19, 1920 (aged 81) Tantallon, Saskatchewan, Canada
- Party: Liberal (1896–1906); Independent Liberal (1906–1920)

James Moffat Douglas (May 26, 1839 – August 19, 1920) was a farmer, missionary and politician from western Canada. He served as MP for a district in the NWT from 1896 to 1904 and as Canadian Senator from 1906 to 1920.

== Background ==
The son of John and Euphemia (Moffat) Douglas, he was born and received his early education in Linton, Bankhead, Roxburghshire in Scotland, and came with his parents to settle on a small farm near Cambray, Ontario, in 1851.

Douglas was elected to the House of Commons of Canada for the district of Assiniboia East in the 1896 Federal Election. He defeated William McDonald, who had been acclaimed as the riding's Member of Parliament in the previous election. Douglas won under the Liberal Party of Canada banner, but also had strong backing from the local farmers' organization, the Patrons of Industry.

In 1900, he was re-elected to represent the district. He retired in 1904.

Douglas was appointed to the Senate of Canada to represent the province of Saskatchewan on the advice of Prime Minister Wilfrid Laurier on March 8, 1906. He served in the Canadian Senate affiliated as an Independent Liberal until his death on August 19, 1920.

Douglas built a homestead in the Qu'Appelle Valley in 1904. He named it Tantallon because he said the location reminded him of Tantallon Castle in Scotland. Tantallon takes its name from the homestead.

== Electoral record ==
1900 Canadian federal election: Assiniboia East
Party	Candidate	Votes	%	±%
Liberal	James Moffat Douglas	4,081	51.64	–7.06
Conservative	Richard Stuart Lake	3,822	48.36	+7.06
Total valid votes		7,903	100.00	
Total rejected ballots		unknown		
Turnout		7,903	76.59	–0.28
Eligible voters		10,319		
Liberal hold		Swing		–7.06
Source: Library of Parliament

1904 Canadian federal election: Assiniboia East
Party	Candidate	Votes	%	±%
Liberal	John Gillanders Turriff	3,770	55.39	+3.75
Conservative	J.R. Brigham	3,036	44.61	–3.75
Total valid votes		6,806	100.00	
Total rejected ballots		unknown		
Turnout		6,806	73.95	–2.64
Eligible voters		9,204		
Liberal hold		Swing		+3.75
Source: Library of Parliament
