= Nicoamen River =

Watercourse in British Columbia, Canada

Coordinates: 50°16′00″N 121°24′00″W

The Nicoamen River is a tributary of the Thompson River in the southern Interior of British Columbia, Canada, located 15 kilometres (9 mi) upstream from its confluence with the Thompson at Lytton.

The Nicoamen forms the extreme northeast boundary of the Cascade Mountains and part of the western boundary of the Thompson Plateau. Located nearby is the Nicoamen Plateau, a small subplateau of the Thompson Plateau.

== History ==
The confluence of the Thompson and Nicoamen is the site of one of the incidents which led to the Fraser Canyon Gold Rush of 1858–60, as the location of a meet-up between the Nlaka'pamux people of the area and American miners.

== See also ==
- List of rivers of British Columbia
