= Nicoamen Plateau =

- Plateau
- Location within British Columbia
- Coordinates: 50°12′00″N 121°14′00″W
- Location: British Columbia, Canada
- Part of: Thompson Plateau

The Nicoamen Plateau is a small sub-plateau of the Thompson Plateau in the southern Interior of British Columbia, Canada, located between the Nicoamen River (W) and the lower valley of the Nicola River (E).
