= Assiniboia East =

Former federal electoral district in the North-West Territories, Canada

Alberta electoral district

Defunct federal electoral district
- Legislature: House of Commons
- District created: 1886
- District abolished: 1907
- First contested: 1887
- Last contested: 1904

Assiniboia East was a federal electoral district in North-West Territories and Saskatchewan, Canada, that was represented in the House of Commons of Canada from 1887 to 1908.

This riding was created in 1886 in the North-West Territories. Following the creation of the province of Saskatchewan in 1905, Assiniboia East became a riding in Saskatchewan until it was abolished in 1907 when it was redistributed into Assiniboia, Qu'Appelle and Saltcoats ridings.

== Members of Parliament ==
Assiniboia East
Parliament	Years	Member	Party
7th	1887–1888	William Dell Perley	Conservative
7th	1888–1891	Edgar Dewdney	Conservative
7th	1891–1892	Edgar Dewdney	Conservative
7th	1892–1896	William Walter McDonald	Conservative
8th	1896–1900	James Moffat Douglas	Liberal
9th	1900–1904	James Moffat Douglas	Liberal
10th	1904–1908	John Gillanders Turriff	Liberal
District redistributed into Assiniboia, Qu'Appelle and Saltcoats

== Election results ==
=== 1904 ===
1904 Canadian federal election
Party	Candidate	Votes	%	±%
Liberal	John Gillanders Turriff	3,770	55.39	+3.75
Conservative	J.R. Brigham	3,036	44.61	–3.75
Total valid votes		6,806	100.00	
Total rejected ballots		unknown		
Turnout		6,806	73.95	–2.64
Eligible voters		9,204		
Liberal hold		Swing		+3.75
Source: Library of Parliament

=== 1900 ===
1900 Canadian federal election
Party	Candidate	Votes	%	±%
Liberal	James Moffat Douglas	4,081	51.64	–7.06
Conservative	Richard Stuart Lake	3,822	48.36	+7.06
Total valid votes		7,903	100.00	
Total rejected ballots		unknown		
Turnout		7,903	76.59	–0.28
Eligible voters		10,319		
Liberal hold		Swing		–7.06
Source: Library of Parliament

=== 1896 ===
1896 Canadian federal election
Party	Candidate	Votes	%	±%
Liberal	James Moffat Douglas	3,556	58.70	+20.01
Conservative	William Walter McDonald	2,502	41.30	–20.01
Total valid votes		6,058	100.00	
Total rejected ballots		unknown		
Turnout		6,058	76.87	–
Eligible voters		7,881		
Liberal gain from Conservative		Swing		+20.01
Source: Library of Parliament

=== 1892 by-election ===
Canadian federal by-election, November 12, 1892 Resignation of Edgar Dewdney
Party	Candidate	Votes
Conservative	William Walter McDonald	acclaimed
Source: Library of Parliament

=== 1891 ===
1891 Canadian federal election
Party	Candidate	Votes	%	±%
Conservative	Edgar Dewdney	2,049	61.31	+1.91
Liberal	John Gillanders Turriff	1,293	38.69	–1.91
Total valid votes		3,342	100.00	
Total rejected ballots		unknown		
Turnout		3,342	67.68	–5.12
Eligible voters		4,938		
Conservative hold		Swing		+1.91
Source: Library of Parliament

=== 1888 by-election ===
Canadian federal by-election, September 12, 1888 Appointment of William Dell Perley to the Senate
Party	Candidate	Votes
Conservative	Edgar Dewdney	acclaimed
Source: Library of Parliament

=== 1887 ===
1887 Canadian federal election
Party	Candidate	Votes	%
Conservative	William Dell Perley	1,736	63.22
Liberal	James Hay Dickie	1,010	36.78
Total valid votes		2,746	100.00
Total rejected ballots		unknown	
Turnout		2,746	72.80
Eligible voters		3,772	
Source: Library of Parliament

== See also ==
- List of Canadian electoral districts
- Historical federal electoral districts of Canada
