= Nicomen Island =

Island in British Columbia, Canada

Coordinates: 49°09′52″N 122°07′00″W

Nicomen Island is an island in the Fraser River in the Fraser Valley region of southwestern British Columbia. Nicomen Mountain in the Douglas Ranges lies to the north across Nicomen Slough. Chilliwack Mountain lies to the south across the Fraser River. Adjacent to the northeast is Skumalasph Island. Dewdney, which by road is about 11 kilometres (7 mi) east of Mission, extends onto the northwestern end of the island. Deroche, which by road is about 29 kilometres (18 mi) west of Agassiz extends onto the northeastern end.

== First Nations ==
Several First Nations reserves exist on the island and in the vicinity. Suggested meanings for Nicomen (Nickcöhrn-men) (Halkomelem) are 'level part', 'part (people) travel to', 'place cut through by a water course', or 'near a big creek'.

The traditional peoples had contact possibly with the Spanish in the 1790s but definitely with fur traders a decade later. Haida war canoes frequently travelled up the river to plunder the villages and take slaves. The original Fort Langley, which was established in 1827, quickly realized that defending against Haida raids was a priority for local First Nations, rather than hunting and bringing in pelts to the fur trading post. Eventually, the Hudson's Bay Company (HBC) fort opened fire on a passing war party, which deterred future raids and allowed the local people to return to a more peaceful existence.

In 1846, the HBC established a fish-curing plant at the mouth of the Chilliwack River, opposite the eastern end of the island, where the local people could bring canoe loads of salmon. The plant operated for about a decade.

== Early European community ==
The northeastern portion, which was pioneered by Joseph Deroche and known as "North Nicomen", is outlined in Deroche. The remainder, called "Nicomen", was settled by James Codville in the mid-1860s. About 1.4 kilometres (0.9 mi) downstream from Deroche Landing, Codville Landing was at the foot of present McDonald Rd. Codville sold animal feed to passersby on the river and wintered their livestock on his 190-hectare (480-acre) holding. He also ran a hotel. It unclear whether the ferry services were just passing but also across the river. During 1865–1866, he operated the first rural post office in mainland BC, before the facility moved to the mouth of the Sumas River. In 1869, Samuel McDonald purchased the property.

In the 1880s, a few farms were established at the western end of the island. As of 1892, only 6% of the land was cultivated, 72% being woodland, and 22% swamp/pasture. Spring freshets regularly flooded much of the island, making crop growing secondary to raising livestock. The 1894 flood was especially extreme.

In 1892, an area from Norrish Creek (mid-island) east to the Harrison River mouth was incorporated as the Nicomen municipality but existed only on paper. The inactive body vanished within a few years.

William Brown was the inaugural official postmaster 1890–1900. Brown was a blacksmith and wheelwright, who lived at the western end near Dewdney. By 1895, Thomas Patton had opened a store, likely in the same area.

Mid-island, immediately southeast of present day Johnson Rd on the Nicomen Island Trunk Rd, the first Nicomen Island school opened in 1890. The building was also used for community events.

J.S. Ashley Cooper opened a store at McDonald Landing and was postmaster 1900–1902. On leaving, his brother Austin D. Cooper moved from Deroche to take over the store and was postmaster 1903–1907. The store unlikely survived more than a year or two longer.

In 1912, a Baptist church was erected on the corner of McDiarmid Rd. In 1916, the school building was replaced.

The island was diked on the Fraser side in 1923 and the slough side in 1929.

The Baptist church closed in the early 1940s. The building became the community hall in 1945 but was demolished in the 1970s.

Transportation developments align with those of Deroche.

Erosion over the decades washed away huge acreages especially around McDonald Landing and the reserve to the west. As the river rose during the 1948 flood, residents and livestock evacuated much of the island before the dike burst, destroying bridges and buildings. Stragglers were rescued from rooftops. Poultry and livestock losses were significant.

== Later community ==
The 35 kilometres (22 mi) of diking around the island protects the agricultural lands. However, sections that are too steep or too low are vulnerable to a major flooding event. To reduce this risk, provincial grants in 2017 provided $6 million to widen dikes and $4.5 million to upgrade the pumping system. However, any repeat of the 1894 flood would still spill over the top. A 2015 report estimated a cost of $65 million to upgrade the whole diking system to modern standards.

In 2017, the British Columbia Court of Appeal reversed the decision of a lower court by dismissing the claims by the great grandchildren of Samuel McDonald for a larger share of the McDonald Landing Farms Ltd assets following their father's death in 2005.

By 2020, the school building was derelict, having sat empty for over a decade.

In 2021, a proposal for a 32-kilometre (20 mi) greenway around the island was in the early planning stages.

== See also ==
- Nicomen Mountain
- Nicoamen River
- Nicoamen Plateau
