= Regional District of Fraser-Cheam =

Former regional district in British Columbia, Canada

Coordinates: 49°35′00″N 121°40′00″W

The Regional District of Fraser-Cheam, commonly called the Fraser-Cheam Regional District, was a regional district in the province of British Columbia, Canada, surrounding the Fraser River from Chilliwack to just south of Lytton. It was created in 1967 but rescinded in 1995. Its area is now part of the Fraser Valley Regional District.

== See also ==
- Cheam Peak (Mount Cheam)
