= Durieu, British Columbia =

Durieu
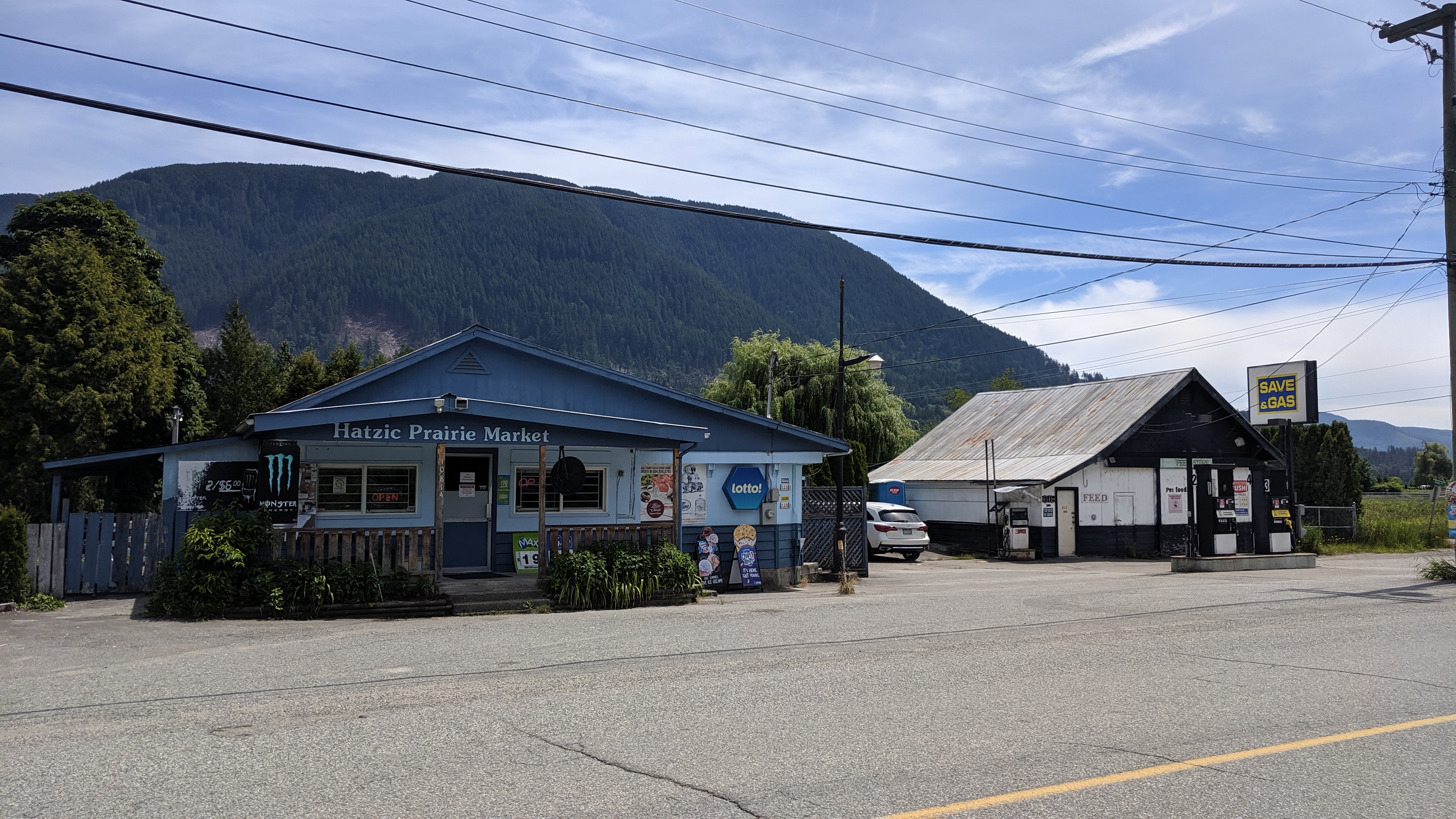
- Durieu's store, feed co-op and gas station on Farms Road on Hatzic Prairie, showing Dewdney Peak in the background, spring 2019.

- Location of Durieu in British Columbia
- Coordinates: 49°13′14″N 122°14′31″W
- Country: Canada
- Province: British Columbia
- Time zone: UTC−07:00 (PT)
- Area codes: 604, 778

Durieu is an unincorporated predominantly farming community, located around five kilometres northeast of Mission, British Columbia, Canada in Area F of the Fraser Valley Regional District of that province's Lower Mainland at an elevation of between twenty and forty metres above sea level. Durieu falls mostly within zone 1 of the Agricultural Land Reserve. Sited in the middle of Hatzic Valley it has few services other than a store, gas station, feed co-op, defunct elementary school and community hall.

Hatzic Prairie's former post office was renamed to Durieu Post Office in remembrance of Archbishop Pierre-Paul Durieu around 1910. This in turn led to British Columbian government officials and cartographers using the name "Durieu" to describe the local settlement from 1939. Durieu currently holds community-level status per the BC Geographic names office.
