= Hatzic Valley =

Valley in British Columbia, Canada

Coordinates: 49°14′00″N 122°14′00″W

NNW over Hatzic Valley from Sylvester Road, just south of Seux Road. Picture shows light snow on Mount Robie Reid.

The Hatzic Valley is the southerly, lowland portion of the Fraser Valley Regional District Electoral Area "F" of British Columbia's Lower Mainland. The valley was carved as a result of southward glacial action, being "centered along a low‐lying glacial trough that extends from Stave Lake to the Fraser Valley."

The perimeter of Hatzic Valley is described in the current British Columbian Official Community Plan document "Official Community Plan for Hatzic Valley, Electoral Area "F" Bylaw No. 0999, 2010", published by the Fraser Valley Regional District, and which illustrates the valley as occupying the area from the southeast point of Stave Lake in the northwest to Hatzic Lake in the south.

The valley is flanked on the eastern side by the Douglas Ranges, the ridge nearest the valley known as Durieu Ridge, the southern point of which forms Dewdney Peak. The valley includes the area occupied by Davis Lake Provincial Park and Mount St. Benedict in the north and that of Cascade Falls Regional Park in the northeast. The valley measures about 12.5 kilometers long from Davis Lake to Hatzic Lake, and about 2.5 kilometers wide at Durieu. The valley is home to approximately 1,300 people.

Hatzic Valley in turn comprises various unincorporated communities, specifically Hatzic Island & Hatzic Prairie in the south, the town of Durieu in the center, and the unincorporated community of McConnell Creek in the north. While Miracle Valley is identified on Google Maps, Miracle Valley was a 160 acre private property - not an unincorporated community.

== Hatzic Valley communities ==
=== McConnell Creek ===
North across Hartley Rd viewing the McConnell Creek Community Hall with Mount St. Benedict behind it, June 2019.

McConnell Creek is the portion of Hatzic Valley that exists north of Durieu Road. A portion of McConnell Creek - 14100 Stave Lake Road - is called "Miracle Valley" and is described below. McConnell Creek is also the former name of Cascade Creek that drains Cascade Falls and runs through the McConnell Creek area, draining into Stave Lake. McConnell Creek is named after a logger, Jack McConnell, who logged in the area, but in fact lived in Silverdale, British Columbia. McConnell changed his name from John Connell after the failure of his Columbia River logging business.

The bulk of McConnell Creek is at an elevation of around 100 meters above level, with the lowest point being Durieu Road at around 20 meters above sea level. The highest point in McConnell Creek, and also the Hatzic Valley perimeter as defined by the FVRD above, is the summit of Mount St Benedict at 1,278 meters above sea level.

Historically, McConnell Creek supported various timber mills, all of which have since shut down. The area was electrified in 1949, the same year that the McConnell Creek Community Hall on Hartley Road opened.

==== Miracle Valley ====
Miracle Valley is a 160 acres (0.65 km^{2}) private parcel of land located at 14100 Stave Lake Road within the McConnell Creek community. It was purchased in 1963 by The Salvation Army, and is so-named as the Salvation Army used it as a rehabilitation center for recovering substance abusers. The facility ran into financial difficulties and closed in 2010, it was sold to become Khalsa Centre, a cultural retreat/campground with an attached blueberry farm. Miracle Valley does not and has not existed since the sale of the private property in 2010. This property is located in the north end of Hatzic Prairie. Miracle Valley is not an unincorporated community, despite appearing on google maps.

=== Hatzic Prairie and Durieu ===
North across Durieu Road, June 2019.

Hatzic Prairie is the portion of Hatzic Valley south of Durieu Road.

Historically, Hatzic Prairie was first occupied by members of the Kwantlen (formerly Sto:lo) First Nations as a summer camping place. The first recorded settler of European descent was the Irish squatter John or James Kelly in the 1860s, who was formerly a Cariboo teamster. After being apprehended for illegally importing cattle he was deported, and went to the USA. In the 1880s some 1,200 acres of land up to present-day Durieu Road was owned by the Burton family, and known as "Burton Prairie". The name changed around 1889 after Ralph Burton sold up because of the flooding of the Fraser River. One of the new owners, Livingston Thompson - a former army captain - built a post office that opened on 1 April of the same year. He became the first postmaster, and renamed the land to Hatzic Prairie.

Looking West over Hatzic Prairie Community Hall, June 2019.

The post office was renamed on 1 March 1910 to Durieu, in remembrance of the life of the Archbishop of New Westminster Pierre-Paul Durieu who had died around a decade earlier. This name change led to the settlement name "Durieu" being recognised on 12 December 1939 by British Columbia government officials and cartographers. Although the post office closed around three years later on 31 December 1942, the name Durieu stuck; in fact Durieu was elevated from "settlement" to "community" status since the BC government definition of community had been met, being "an unincorporated populated place, generally with a population of 50 or more, and having a recognized central area that might contain a post office, store and/or community hall, etc, intended for the use of the general public in the region".

==== Flooding on Hatzic Prairie ====
The name "Hatzic Prairie" is due to renaming by Livingstone Thompson after Ralph Burton sold the land, a sale which, as mentioned above, would not have occurred but for flooding of the area by the Fraser River. The area continued to flood - notably in 1894 - but the most serious recorded flooding by the Fraser River was the "Great Flood" of 1948 which flooded over 13,000 acres of land in adjacent lowland areas, twelve square miles of which were on Hatzic Prairie.

Because of historical issues with flooding, extensive studies have been completed regarding potential floodwater impact on lower-lying Fraser Valley communities. These studies have focussed in particular on Hatzic Prairie, where much of the terrain is lower than 20 metres above sea level, being for the most part drained by Legace Creek, which also drains Pattison Creek. These studies include the following publications:

- The "Hatzic Prairie Drainage Study" of August 1992, whose purpose, stated at p123, was to "develop a comprehensive plan to reduce flood damages and channel instability."
- The "Flood Damage Recovery Plan, Legace Creek, Hatzic Valley Draft Report" of June 2005, prepared by Northwest Hydraulic Consultants, which examined drainage of Hatzic Valley via Legace Creek, and proposed, per page i, "gravel removal, channel recontouring, bank protection and sediment traps" to mitigate the likelihood of overbank flooding and ensuing property damage. The costs of dredging and associated work were put at just over $1M, and the report advised on page ii that any such work undertaken may be overwhelmed by "the chronic occurrence of high-energy debris flood or debris flow events that regularly introduce vast quantities of sediment to the channel."

Since the above reports were published, The Fraser Basin Council has embarked on authoring a multi-phase Lower Mainland Flood Management Strategy (LMFMS), the first phase of which was completed in 2016: "BC Lower Mainland flood scenarios, a regional assessment of flood vulnerabilities and a review of flood protection works and practices in the region." In commenting on the maps published under Phase 1 of the LMFMS, The Hope Standard observed that "the deepest floodwaters would swamp the north and east of Hatzic Lake, in and around Dewdney and Deroche on the north side of the Fraser River, and the Glen Valley in northwest Abbotsford and northeast Langley, where many areas could see flood waters rise three metres or more above ground."

The second phase of the LMFMS program consists of multiple projects, and has the purpose of "developing a long-term strategy", having an expected completion date of late 2020/ early 2021.

== Water ==
There are three known aquifers in the Hatzic Valley area

- The "Hatzic Prairie Aquifer", the southmost and shallowest aquifer in the Hatzic Valley,
- The "Cascade Aquifer", the northmost aquifer in the valley, laying north of Cascade and south of Davis Creeks,
- The "McConnell Aquifer", also described in some of the following references as "Miracle Valley Aquifer", an aquifer between the above two aquifers in the Hatzic Valley.

The Hatzic Prairie and Cascade aquifers are described as "highly vulnerable" because of high levels of soil permeability, readily allowing contaminants into the aquifer. The McConnell Aquifer is described as having "low vulnerability because the aquifer is capped with relatively impermeable sediments, which prevent contaminants from entering the aquifer." However Tom Millard, geomorphologist, indicates in his 2013 paper titled "Hatzic Region Hydrology and Watershed Stability Assessment" that the low vulnerability aquifer may not replenish as readily as the others because of its lower permeability.

Many of the residents in Hatzic Valley have wells directly connecting to one of the three above-named aquifers. Additionally, the FVRD supplies water south of Durieu Road via various wells, pumps, reservoirs and pipelines. Groundwater in the Hatzic Prairie community is an ongoing concern on account of the heightened water table relative to ground level and resulting potential contamination of fresh water by farms and septic systems, especially given the vulnerability of the aquifer as described above.

Expansion of the current FVRD supply system is an ongoing concern, with a number of studies and academic publications probing sustainability and hydrogeological issues. These include a 2011 study by Thomas D'Hoore of UBC on behalf of various Hatzic Valley Ratepayer Associations and 2012 (Miracle Valley Aquifer paper), 2014 (Well viability paper with regard to the Hatzic Prairie and Miracle Valley Aquifers), and 2017 (Construction and testing of a named production well in the valley) publications by Piteau Associates on behalf of the District of Mission and the FVRD. Additionally, hydrogeological and water-related plans and issues are described by the Hatzic Valley Official Community Plan.

As of March 2019 the FVRD has indicated, notwithstanding concerns regarding sustainability, that construction of an additional well will commence immediately in order to avoid potential loss of a financial grant by the Clean Water and Wastewater Fund.

== Land use ==
=== Provincial and Regional Parks ===
Hatzic Valley is adjacent to Hatzic Lake in the south and Stave Lake in the northwest, although there is no direct access to Stave Lake from Hatzic Valley. Hatzic Valley is connected with Cascade Falls Regional Park in the northeast and Davis Lake Provincial Park in the north.

=== Private land ===
The bulk of the privately owned land in Hatzic Valley is within the British Columbia Agricultural Land Reserve. Accordingly, land in the valley is used residentially and economically for hobby and commercial farming. Natural resources such as timber and aggregate are also extracted from neighbouring hills and mountains.
