= Dewdney Peak =

Mountain in British Columbia, Canada

- Location within British Columbia

Highest point
- Elevation: 930 m (3,050 ft)
- Prominence: 160 m (520 ft)
- Parent peak: Unnamed at head of Pattison Creek
- Coordinates: 49°11′21″N 122°11′53″W

Geography
- Location: British Columbia, Canada
- Parent range: Douglas Ranges

Dewdney Peak, also known unofficially as Hatzic Mountain, is the southwesternmost summit of the Douglas Ranges in the Lower Mainland of southern British Columbia, Canada. Dewdney Peak is located east of Hatzic Prairie and north of Dewdney, British Columbia, from whence it got its name.

== Recreation ==
Dewdney Peak can be hiked via two trails on the east side of Dewdney Peak, accessed via the Norrish Creek Forest Service Road to the immediate east of the peak. The hike to the summit of Dewdney Peak - "The Dewdney Grind" - allows access to a memorial cabin named for Ben Von Hardenberg, a local firefighter who perished in a helicopter accident in 2003.
