= Dewdney-Alouette Regional District =

Coordinates: 49°30′00″N 122°20′00″W

The Dewdney-Alouette Regional District was a regional district in the Lower Mainland of British Columbia, Canada, comprising the district municipalities of Pitt Meadows, Maple Ridge and Mission and unincorporated areas east to the Harrison River and north to the southern end of Lillooet Lake. The regional district was partitioned when the Greater Vancouver Regional District (branded Metro Vancouver) was expanded in 1995 to take in Pitt Meadows and Maple Ridge; the regional district's eastern half was combined with the former Central Fraser Valley Regional District and the Regional District of Fraser-Cheam to form the Fraser Valley Regional District.
