= Fraser Valley Regional District =

Regional district in British Columbia, Canada

Coordinates: 49°35′00″N 121°50′00″W

Fraser Valley
- Regional district
- Fraser Valley Regional District
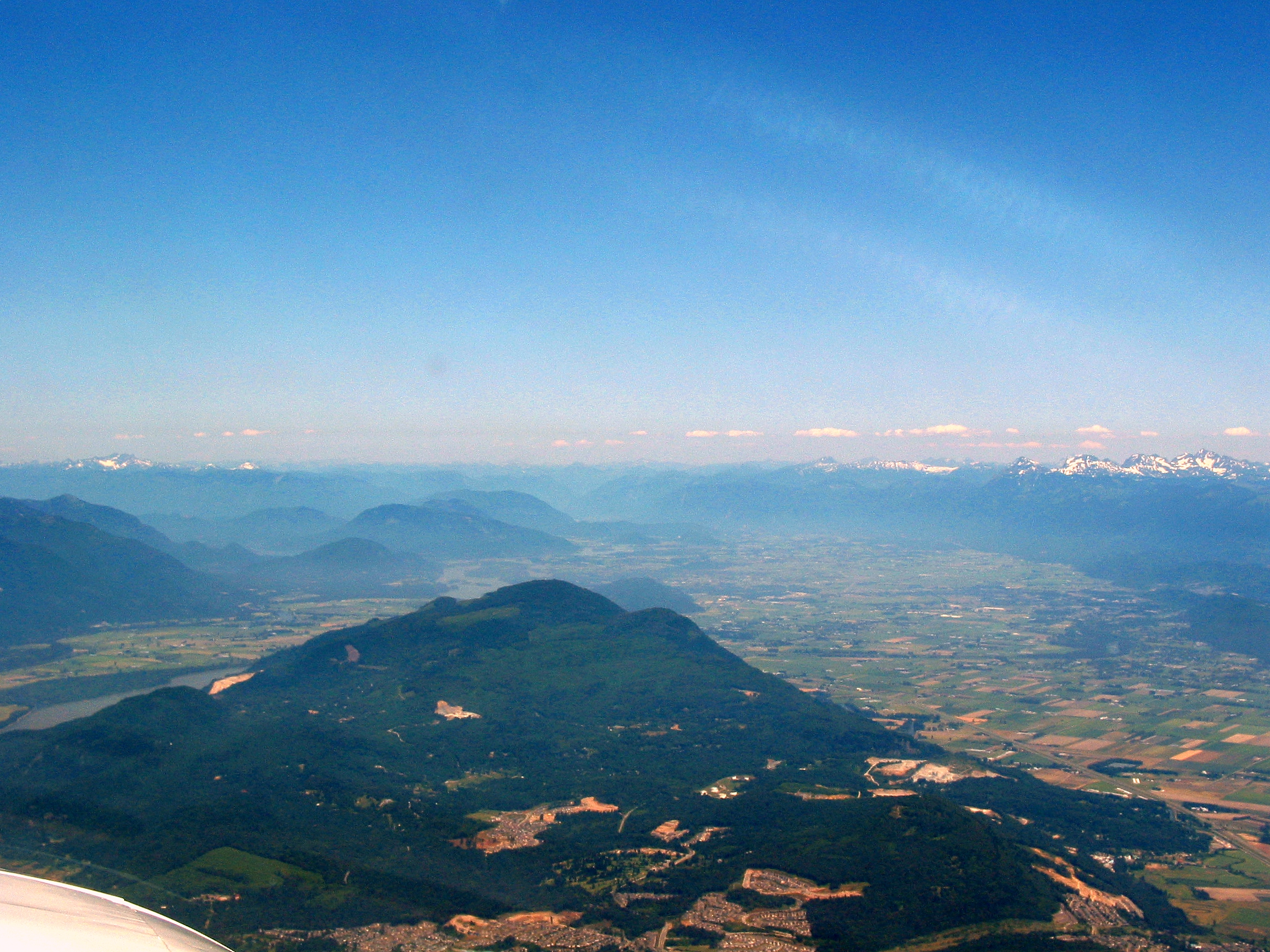
- View departing Abbotsford Airport

- Logo

- Location in British Columbia
- Country: Canada
- Province: British Columbia
- Seat: Chilliwack

Government
  - Type: Regional district
  - Body: Board of directors
  - Chair: Patricia Ross (Abbotsford)
  - Vice chair: Chris Kloot (Chilliwack)
  - Electoral areas: A - Boston Bar–North Bend–Canyon Alpine; B - Yale/Choate/Dogwood Valley/Emory Creek/Laidlaw/Othello/Ruby Creek/Spuzzum/Sunshine Valley; C - Sasquatch Country; D - Popkum–Bridal Falls; E - Chilliwack River Valley; F - McConnell Creek-Hatzic Prairie; G - Nicomen Island–Deroche–Dewdney–Hatzic Island; H - Cultus Lake–Columbia Valley–Lindell Beach

Area
  - Land: 13,335.28 km^{2} (5,148.78 sq mi)

Population (2021)
  - Total: 324,005
  - Density: 24.3/km^{2} (63/sq mi)
- Website: www.fvrd.ca

The Fraser Valley Regional District (FVRD) is a regional district in British Columbia, Canada. Its headquarters are in the city of Chilliwack. The FVRD covers an area of 13,361.74 km^{2} (5,159 sq mi). It was created in 1995 by an amalgamation of the Fraser-Cheam Regional District and Central Fraser Valley Regional District and the portion of the Dewdney-Alouette Regional District from and including the District of Mission eastwards.

The FVRD is the third most populous Regional District in British Columbia, incorporating roughly the eastern half of the Lower Mainland of southwestern BC, and is bordered by Whatcom County, Washington to the south, Metro Vancouver to the west, the Okanagan-Similkameen Regional District to the east, the Squamish-Lillooet Regional District to the northwest, and the Thompson-Nicola Regional District to the northeast.

It also includes unincorporated areas north of the City of Pitt Meadows, which were part of the Dewdney-Alouette Regional District but which were not transferred to the Metro Vancouver Regional District (MVRD) when it expanded to include Pitt Meadows and Maple Ridge.

== Demographics ==
As a census division in the 2021 Census of Population conducted by Statistics Canada, the Fraser Valley Regional District had a population of 324,005 living in 118,217 of its 124,988 total private dwellings, a change of 9.5% from its 2016 population of 295,934. With a land area of 13,319.34 km^{2} (5,142.63 sq mi), it had a population density of 24.3/km^{2} (63.0/sq mi) in 2021.

=== Population by census subdivision ===
Area	Population (2006)	Population (2011)	Population (2016)	Population (2021)
City of Abbotsford	123,864	133,497	141,397	153,524
City of Chilliwack	69,217	77,936	83,788	93,203
City of Mission	34,505	36,426	38,554	41,519
District of Hope	6,185	5,969	6,181	6,686
District of Kent	4,738	5,664	6,067	6,300
Village of Harrison Hot Springs	1,573	1,468	1,468	1,905
Electoral Area "A"	478	442	405	495
Electoral Area "B"	796	721	892	869
Electoral Area "C"	952	973	1,023	1,133
Electoral Area "D"	1,296	1,346	1,529	2,092
Electoral Area "E"	3,481	3,358	1,540	1,568
Electoral Area "F"	1,339	1,303	1,293	1,384
Electoral Area "G"	1,914	1,764	1,776	1,692
Electoral Area "H"	394	N/A (dissolved)	1,847	2,459
First Nation Reserves			8,164	9,161

=== Ethnicity ===
Panethnic groups in the Fraser Valley Regional District (2001−2021)
Panethnic group	2021		2016		2011		2006		2001	
Panethnic group	Pop.	%	Pop.	%	Pop.	%	Pop.	%	Pop.	%
European (Note: Statistic includes all persons that did not make up part of a visible minority or an indigenous identity.)	212,630	66.93%	208,025	72.04%	205,540	75.66%	199,415	78.56%	193,020	82.54%
South Asian	53,585	16.87%	39,920	13.82%	33,375	12.29%	26,365	10.39%	19,295	8.25%
Indigenous	24,010	7.56%	22,205	7.69%	18,540	6.82%	14,535	5.73%	11,525	4.93%
Southeast Asian (Note: Statistic includes total responses of "Filipino" and "Southeast Asian" under visible minority section on census.)	8,480	2.67%	4,985	1.73%	3,115	1.15%	2,820	1.11%	2,515	1.08%
East Asian (Note: Statistic includes total responses of "Chinese", "Korean", and "Japanese" under visible minority section on census.)	7,940	2.5%	6,700	2.32%	5,890	2.17%	6,375	2.51%	4,245	1.82%
African	3,520	1.11%	2,495	0.86%	1,840	0.68%	1,275	0.5%	915	0.39%
Latin American	3,045	0.96%	2,050	0.71%	1,385	0.51%	1,785	0.7%	1,325	0.57%
Middle Eastern (Note: Statistic includes total responses of "West Asian" and "Arab" under visible minority section on census.)	2,045	0.64%	860	0.3%	635	0.23%	495	0.2%	255	0.11%
Other (Note: Statistic includes total responses of "Visible minority, n.i.e." and "Multiple visible minorities" under visible minority section on census.)	2,405	0.76%	1,515	0.52%	1,330	0.49%	780	0.31%	755	0.32%
Total responses	317,670	98.04%	288,765	97.58%	271,655	97.86%	253,840	98.76%	233,850	98.44%
Total population	324,005	100%	295,934	100%	277,593	100%	257,031	100%	237,550	100%

- Note: Totals greater than 100% due to multiple origin responses.

=== Language ===
According to the 2011 Census, 76.47% of Fraser Valley's population have English as mother tongue; Punjabi is the mother tongue of 10.02% of the population, followed by German (3.49%), Dutch (1.39%), French (1.07%), Korean (0.69%), Spanish (0.66%), Tagalog (0.35%), Chinese, n.o.s. (0.33%), and Vietnamese (0.30%).

Knowledge of languages in the Fraser Valley Regional District (1991−2021)
Language	2021		2011		2001		1991 (Note: Statistic includes the results from the former regional districts of Fraser-Cheam and Central Fraser Valley, and the subdivision of Mission, all of which were later amalgamated to form the Fraser Valley Regional District)	
Language	Pop.	%	Pop.	%	Pop.	%	Pop.	%
English	306,300	96.42%	264,790	97.47%	229,090	97.96%	176,445	98.59%
Punjabi	47,065	14.82%	30,595	11.26%	17,935	7.67%	7,595	4.24%
French	13,695	4.31%	12,625	4.65%	12,290	5.26%	8,470	4.73%
Hindustani (Note: Combined responses of Hindi and Urdu as they form mutually intelligible registers of the Hindustani language.)	10,295	3.24%	4,010	1.48%	4,180	1.79%	1,275	0.71%
German	7,600	2.39%	10,205	3.76%	13,555	5.8%	14,860	8.3%
Spanish	5,795	1.82%	3,900	1.44%	3,360	1.44%	1,675	0.94%
Chinese (Note: Combined responses of the Chinese languages, including Mandarin, Cantonese, Min Nan, Hakka, Wu (Shanghainese), Min Dong, Chinese, n.o.s., and Chinese languages, n.i.e..)	3,735	1.18%	2,295	0.84%	1,975	0.84%	1,200	0.67%
Dutch	3,565	1.12%	4,730	1.74%	5,525	2.36%	4,825	2.7%
Tagalog	3,275	1.03%	1,190	0.44%	545	0.23%	240	0.13%
Korean	2,170	0.68%	2,045	0.75%	1,100	0.47%	190	0.11%
Vietnamese	2,040	0.64%	730	0.27%	985	0.42%	435	0.24%
Polish	805	0.25%	730	0.27%	755	0.32%	605	0.34%
Ukrainian	555	0.17%	625	0.23%	1,055	0.45%	1,110	0.62%
Total responses	317,670	98.04%	271,655	97.86%	233,850	98.44%	178,975	98.21%
Total population	324,005	100%	277,593	100%	237,550	100%	182,243	100%

== Services ==
While the member municipalities provide for their own municipal services, the FVRD acts as the local government for the electoral areas. As a local government or regional district, it can provide services such as water piping, storm sewers, sanitary sewers, street lighting, waste management, fire protection, mosquito control, enhanced 911 service, emergency preparedness/recovery, cablevision, air quality monitoring, library funding, growth management, park maintenance, building inspections and bylaw enforcement, planning, and development approvals. Each area does not necessarily receive all these services so each electoral area pays property taxes, through the provincial government, in accordance with the particular services they receive. The FVRD has opted to implement a regional growth strategy, as allowed by Section 25 of the BC Local Government Act.

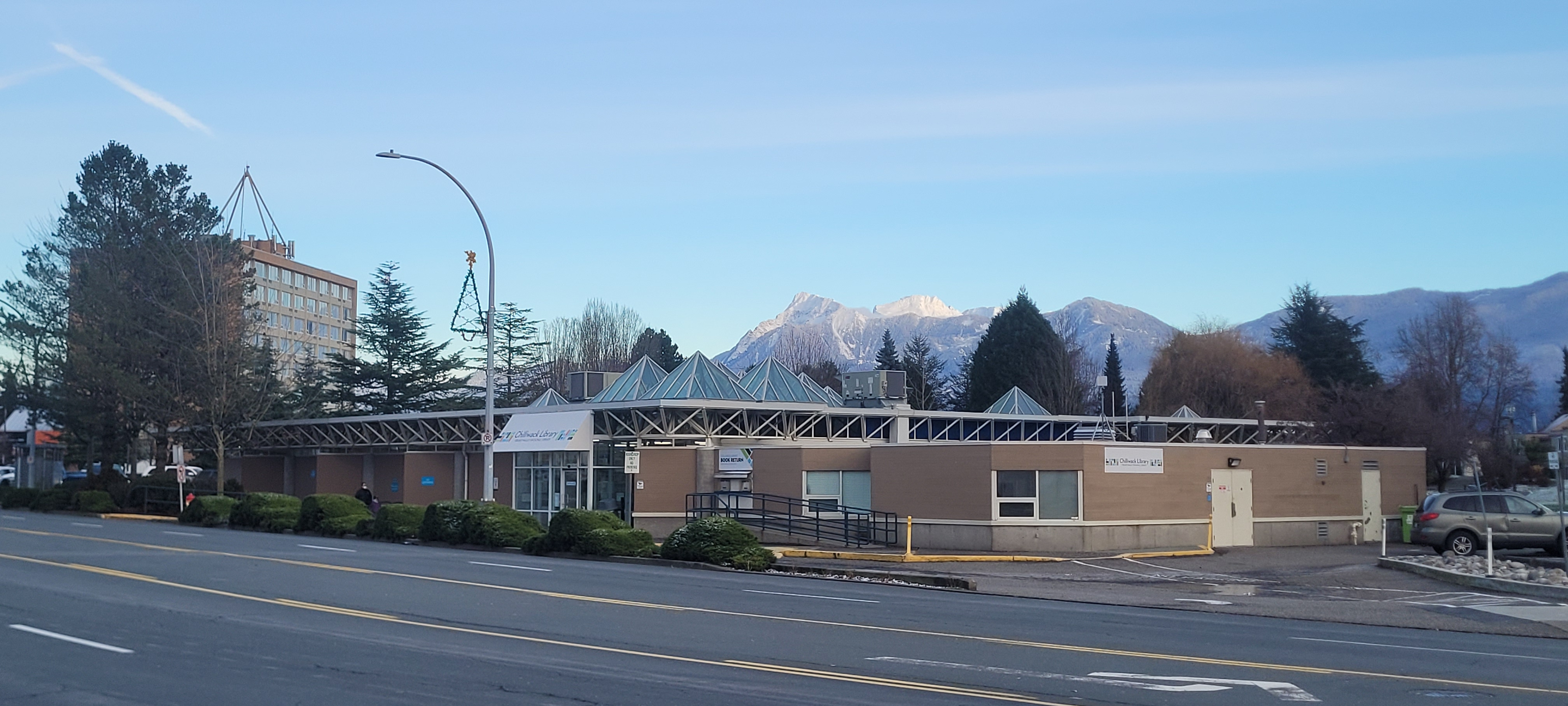
Fraser Valley Regional Library is a region-wide library system with over 20 locations in the Fraser Valley. This specific branch is located in Chilliwack, British Columbia.

== Political structure ==
The regional district is a federation of municipalities and electoral areas. Each municipality appoints councillors to the board of directors for the regional district in proportion to their relative population sizes and the electoral areas directly elect one director each.

== Economy ==
Economically, the area has grown around resource extraction, specifically farming, logging and gravel mining. Much of the Fraser Valley's land base is within the Agricultural Land Reserve (ALR). The balance, not privately owned is in Crown Lands. Retirement and recreational services (like campgrounds, RV parks, boating, skiing etc.) have become increasingly important. However, most commercial and industrial activities are kept within the municipal boundaries and leaving the electoral areas for farming and rural residential uses.

== Electoral area, geography, and climate ==
The areas in a regional district that are not incorporated are called ‘electoral areas’.

=== Electoral area "A" ===
Boston Bar and North Bend, with populations nearing 200 people each, are the two main small towns in this area. Other residents of this area live in small subdivisions (i.e. Canyon Alpine and Falls Creek) or Indian reserves which line the Fraser Canyon.

=== Electoral area "B" ===
Communities in this area are connected by three highways (Highway #1, #3, #5) which radiate out of the District of Hope. The communities of Dogwood Valley, Emory Creek, and Choate are just north of Hope and have a combined population of about 133 people. Sunshine Valley is a community on BC Highway 3 southeast of Hope with 164 people and was originally a Japanese internment camp named Tashme. Other communities in this area include Laidlaw, west of Hope, and Spuzzum, north of Yale.

=== Electoral area "C" ===
Communities in this area include Lake Errock with 368 people, Harrison Mills with 141 people, and the resort town of Hemlock Valley, with only 15 permanent residents (but several hundred hotel guests and condo residents during the ski season). There are vacation homes on islands in Harrison Lake.

=== Electoral area "D" ===
The population of this area lives in the unincorporated villages of Popkum and Bridal Falls. Combined they have a population of 972 people.

=== Electoral area "E" ===
The Chilliwack River runs east-west through this area. Most of the population live in the small area between the mountains and the river, which is generally divided into three areas: Slesse Park, Baker Trails and Bell Acres.

Other residents of this area live on the north end of Cultus Lake, or in the Columbia Valley, south of Cultus Lake, bordering Washington state.

=== Electoral area "F" ===
Area F lies between the boundaries of the Squamish-Lillooet Regional District to the north and west, the Metro Vancouver Regional District to the west, Electoral Area G and the cities of Mission and Maple Ridge to the South, and Electoral Area C to the east. The Area F population of approximately 1,300 people lives exclusively in the southern, lowland portion of Area F, specifically that between Hatzic Lake and the southeast end of Stave Lake, as everything in this electoral area north of Stave Lake is inaccessible or uninhabitable. This inhabited lowland area is also known as Hatzic Valley, and includes the unincorporated localities of McConnell Creek and Miracle Valley in the north, and Hatzic Prairie and the farming town of Durieu in the south.

=== Electoral Area "G" ===
This small but populous (~1,800 pop.) Electoral Area lies mainly north of the Fraser River but also encompasses portions of Sumas Mountain to the south (formerly Electoral Area "H".) Area "G" borders the District of Mission to the west, Electoral Areas "F" and "C" to the North and East and the city of Abbotsford, British Columbia to the south. It includes the communities of Hatzic Island, Dewdney, Nicomen Island, and Deroche. FVRD local services provided to Area "G" include the Dewdney and Deroche Community Water Systems, North Fraser Fire Protection, North Side Street Lighting and North Side Garbage.

Farming (dairy, nursery and blue berries) and resource extraction (forestry and aggregate) along with recreation are the primary activities. Approximately one-quarter of the residents live on Hatzic Island with much of the Electoral Area's remaining population residing in more rural locations and on Leq’a:mel First Nation Reserve lands.

The Sasquatch Lions Club (member club of Lions Clubs International) is the predominant service organization found in Area "G" and the Deroche and District Community Association has been active since 1908.

=== Electoral Area "H" ===
This new Electoral Area H was re-established in 2014 to include Cultus Lake and Columbia Valley. Previously, Electoral Area H was dissolved in 2008, with privately owned lands within the area being annexed into Abbotsford, and crown lands being reassigned to Electoral Area "G". The previous area consisted of the majority of Sumas Mountain.

== See also ==
- Pacific Ranges — the mountains comprising the northern half to the district.
- Fraser Valley — the river valley comprising the southern half of the district.
