= Ruskin, British Columbia =

Ruskin
- Rural community
- Location in British Columbia
- Coordinates: 49°12′00″N 122°26′00″W
- Country: Canada
- Province: British Columbia

Ruskin is a rural, naturally-treed community, about 35 mi (56 km) east of Vancouver on the north shore of the Fraser River. It was named around 1900 after the English art critic, essayist, and prominent social thinker John Ruskin.

Ruskin is one of the historical communities of the municipality of Maple Ridge. In that context Ruskin borders on its west side with the community of Whonnock by the Whonnock Creek and the Whonnock Reserve, and on the east side with the municipality of Mission. The border to the south is the Fraser River and to the north the point where Whonnock Creek crosses the Mission borderline. Ruskin touches the Stave River at the tip of the southwest corner where the Stave River flows into the Fraser River.

The area generally understood as Ruskin goes beyond those boundaries. Ruskin in a social sense straddles the municipal border of Maple Ridge and Mission. In that close-knit community there was and is no border separating residents from Maple Ridge from those in Mission. Residents who lived and are still living along the western shore of the lower Stave River, even if they live in the municipality of Mission, consider their neighbourhood as Ruskin.

== Settlement and history ==
Permanent white settlers only came to the Ruskin area after the 1885 completion of the Canadian Pacific Railway, Canada's first transcontinental railroad. The Whonnock First Nation claimed for themselves the land along the Fraser River between the Stave River and Whonnock Creek but this land was not included in the Whonnock Indian Reserve and was released for settlement.

The entire area on both sides of the Stave River, including Whonnock and Ruskin, was originally referred to as Stave River. Over time the settlers gave distinctive names to separate localities within that large area. For Ruskin the opening of a post office made its name official. That happened with the nomination of a postmaster on January 1, 1898. By that time the settlement of Ruskin Mills had been established in the area.

== Lumber industry ==
=== Ruskin Mills: The Canadian Co-operative Society ===
Members of the Canadian Co-operative Society, formed in Mission, BC, in 1895, gave the name Ruskin Mills to a sawmill and to the settlement they established at the mouth of the Stave River in present-day Ruskin.

Although nothing in the constitution and bylaws of the Society alludes to the formation of an utopian Ruskin socialist colony, some leading members sympathized with and discussed Ruskin's social ideas frequently.

At first the Canadian Co-operative Society was a success. In 1897 the co-operative counted 54 members, most living close to the mill. There they had built homes and barns and a boarding house. Aside from the sawmill and a logging operation, the members had set up a general store, a smithy, and a shoemaker's shop. They also ran a dairy and a vegetable farm. Not less than thirty students—mostly the members' children—attended the first school in Ruskin in the spring of 1897.

The year 1898 was the last year of the co-operative in Ruskin. In the traditional way, logs were pulled by horses or oxen to Stave River and floated down to the mill but due to a rainless summer the Stave River dried up and logs could not be moved to the mill. Lacking money and facing potential bankruptcy the Society surrendered its assets to E.H. Heaps & Co. who had supplied the machinery for the mill on credit.

Most members moved away. Only a few members stayed and worked at the mill for a year or so.

=== Heaps & Co. ===
Heaps & Co. turned the small Ruskin mill into a progressive operation. They started expanding and upgrading the mill and horse or oxen logging was replaced by steam and railway logging. Heaps built a logging rail line that grew northwest until it reached Dewdney Trunk Road and down a short distance along the east side of Kanaka Creek.

Across the Canadian Pacific Railway (CPR) rail track, on the shore of the Fraser River, was Heaps office building that also accommodated the general store and post office as well living quarters for senior staff and their families.

The Heaps mill at Ruskin burned down in the winter of 1904/1905 and was rebuilt, only to burn down again in 1910. Plans to rebuild the mill failed when no money could be raised by the company. There were plans and promises for a new and even larger mill, but Heaps's Ruskin logging and lumber operations went in receivership after the building boom in Vancouver crashed in 1913.

=== Stoltze Manufacturing Co. ===
As Heaps's operation came to an end, a shingle mill started operations on the Stave River less than half a mile upriver from the ruins of the Heaps mill and just across the municipal border line in Mission. Stoltze Manufacturing Co. was American-owned. Their shingle mill at Stave River started operating in 1912. Because their main market was in the United States and not the depressed local market. Stoltze went from strength to strength right from the start. The company owned tree-limits but could soon count on a continuous supply of cedar when Abernethy-Lougheed won the contract for 8,000 acres of timber at Stave Lake in 1914. In the 1920s Stoltze was the largest shingle mill in British Columbia. Stoltze's success depended heavily on the employment of in particular Japanese workers in the woods and in the mill. The 1930 depression hit the mill hard and it closed during the Second World War.

== Japanese community ==
After the First World War, Japanese started farming in Ruskin, mostly growing raspberries and strawberries. In the 1930s there were about thirty registered Japanese landowners in Ruskin. Some seventy-five percent of the Ruskin population was Japanese. Photos of school classes of that time show that not more than a handful of the students of the Ruskin elementary school were of European origin. The Japanese settlers had their own community hall on 280th Street. There were Japanese logging operations in the area and a couple of small Japanese sawmills. That all ended with the expulsion and Japanese-Canadian internment in 1942. The forcible uprooting of Japanese Canadians ended any significant type of agriculture in the community.

== Commerce and industry ==
The mills and the businesses of Ruskin were and are all in the south-east corner of Ruskin close to where the Stave River joins the Fraser River, close to the rail tracks and since 1930 present-day Lougheed Highway.

Already the Canadian Co-operative Society had a general store, and later Heaps had one in their building, together with the post office. The shop continued to be in that building even after Heaps stopped their Ruskin operation. In 1924, the Cash Grocery store to a new building on the north side of the railway tracks, where it served the community for more than half a century. The building was demolished for the widening of Lougheed Highway. A small shop, combined with a gas station, serves the area today.

The Ruskin railway station, built in 1910, stood here until there were no longer enough passengers to warrant a stop of the scheduled trains. The building was dismantled in 1961.

Lumber remained the main industry of Ruskin. With the station also the resident CPR agent disappeared, whose services the industry thought to be "absolutely essential."

== School ==
After Heaps took over the operation of former Ruskin Mills the school moved to a location on 96th Avenue at the foot of 284th Street. That is where the school stayed until it was closed in 1998. After that Ruskin students attended the Whonnock Elementary School.

== Ruskin Community Hall ==
For their community events the residents of Ruskin assembled in the schoolhouse or occasionally in the Heaps building. When in 1916 the old schoolhouse was replaced by a two-room building, the residents pulled the old structure across the street and made it their community hall. That first building burned down in 1922—the date shown on the front of the hall today—and was replaced by the present structure, opened in 1924. The hall is owned and operated by Ruskin Community Hall Association, incorporated in 1930.

== Ruskin Dam ==
Ruskin Dam is in the District of Mission, standing at the narrowest point of what had been the Stave River canyon, was completed in 1930 for purpose of hydroelectric power generation. The dam's reservoir is named Hayward Lake, named after one of the company's engineer, and is about 4.5 miles in length. A small employees' village or camp adjacent to the facility is also referred to informally as Ruskin Dam. Before the project, there had been a hunting and fishing lodge still in use as a private residence, and a couple of small farms.

Higher up on the Stave River is the Stave Dam (actually two dams flanking what is now technically an island), built over Stave Falls, once a natural feature of the Stave River and now the name of the community stretching from the dam west along Dewdney Trunk Road as far as Wilson Street, which is the continuation of what Maple Ridge designates as 287th Street (formerly 34th Avenue). The falls is a dry falls now, below Blind Slough Dam, one of the two dams forming Stave Lake; the Stave Falls Powerhouse is immediately below the main dam, which is the western pair of the two. It is now a museum and visitor centre.

In 1899, the year when Heaps took over the Ruskin mill, the Stave Lake Power Company was formed and subsequently obtained permission from the province to use the water of the river at the Stave Falls to generate electric power. It took more than a decade to make that a reality. Only in December 1911 did their successor, the Western Canada Power Company, see power starting to flow from the Stave Dam plant.

The Stave Falls Branch, an electric railway built by the British Columbia Electric Railway Company in 1910, connected the CPR line at Ruskin with the construction site. The traffic generated by the activities around the Stave Falls dam convinced the CPR to approve the building of a rail station at Ruskin that same year – one of the many things by which the residents of Ruskin profited from what happened in their backyard. The railway's track-grade is still extant through the community, and the portion of it along Hayward Lake is now a walking trail; some of its trestles still stand in ruins, partly demolished to keep people from climbing on them. The trail is part of a 10 km (6.2 mi) circuit around the lake which returns to Ruskin Dam on the east side of the lake, which was built by prisoners from the correctional centres in Mission. The older rail grade, from before the dam was built, can also be discerned below Ruskin Dam, with tracks rising out of the water a mile or so below Stave Falls Dam.
