= Silverdale, British Columbia =

Coordinates: 49°09′00″N 122°24′00″W

Silverdale is a semi-rural neighbourhood of the District of Mission, British Columbia, Canada, located about 40 km east of Vancouver on the east bank of the Stave River at its confluence with the Fraser. Noted for its historic Italian Canadian community, its economy was farming, fishing and logging based until the general suburbanization of Fraser Valley life in the 1960s and 1970s. Of its Italian community, notable offspring include Phil Gaglardi, former BC Highways minister, and speed-skater Eden Donatelli. Silverdale is also notable as the site of Canada's first train robbery, by the "Gentleman Bandit" Billy Miner, and it is there he is supposed to have first used the polite "Hands Up!" in the course of the robbery.

The lakeshore residences on the east side of Silvermere Lake are part of Silverdale. Silvermere was created by the dredging of the marshlands in the area.

Silverdale was named after Silverdale, Staffordshire. The name was chosen from a list of British places by J. A. Skinner, an early postmaster.
