= Silvermere Lake (Canada) =

- Location within British Columbia
- Location: Silverdale, Mission, British Columbia, Canada
- Coordinates: 49°11′00″N 122°24′00″W
- Type: man-made lake

Silvermere Lake, locally called Hullah's Lake, is located on the west side of Silverdale, a rural neighborhood of Mission, British Columbia, is a man made lake. It is visible from and adjacent to the Lougheed Highway, which follows a causeway on the lake's south side. The lake covers an inter tidal prairie with natural drainage patterns coming off of the Silverdale and Silverhill areas on the East side of the lake and joining the Stave River above the highway. BC geological survey aerial photography from the early 1950s shows this Photo # BC1782:40) The lake was created by diking both of off the highway and on the North end to Hayward road. The dikes were constructed by dump and push methods with raw gravel mined from the North end of the island. The only native ground removal from the bottom of the lake was done by dredging was along the South end, in front of the houses, to increase depth and at the North end to create more land base for development. The North dredging created a hole that used to be up to 30 feet deep. All of this was part of a 1950s vintage real estate development by Norman William (Ned) Hullah's. He built his private estate on the naturally occurring hill along the west side of the lake. This hill now locally known as the Island, though previously it was known as Hullah's Island. The ownership of the island is split more or less equally down the middle between I.R. on the West and Private land on the East. The private portion includes the lake bottom to the Fraser 1896 high water mark in front of all of the housing along the shore. The portion South of the highway was recently subdivided out to Ducks Unlimited.

The name Stave River was created by Hudson's Bay Company employees. The native name for the river is forgotten, although modern-day natives refer to it as Skayuks ("everyone died"), also the name given to one of three villages that were located in the delta marshlands of the lower reaches of the river at the time of non-native settlement (1870s onwards). The name is a reference to consequences of the successive smallpox plagues and other disease pandemics which destroyed the populations and cultures of the Fraser Valley.

== See also ==
- List of lakes of British Columbia
