= MRCC =

MRCC — acronym, may refer to:

- ICAO code for Coto 47 Airport (Costa Rica)
- Maritime Rescue Coordination Centre, for example:
  Hong Kong MRCC
  Mumbai MRCC
- Medical Representatives Certification Commission
- Member of the Royal College of Chiropractors, see List of post-nominal letters (United Kingdom)
- Midwest Regional Climate Center
- Mildura Rural City Council
- Mission Regional Chamber of Commerce
- Mobile Reconnaissance and Command Center, see for example PPRU-1
- Multi-Reference Coupled Cluster
- Multi-Role Combatant Craft, see Wet sub
- Mumbai Regional Congress Committee, of the Indian National Congress

mRCC — Metastatic renal cell carcinoma
