= Stave Lake =

Body of water in British Columbia, Canada

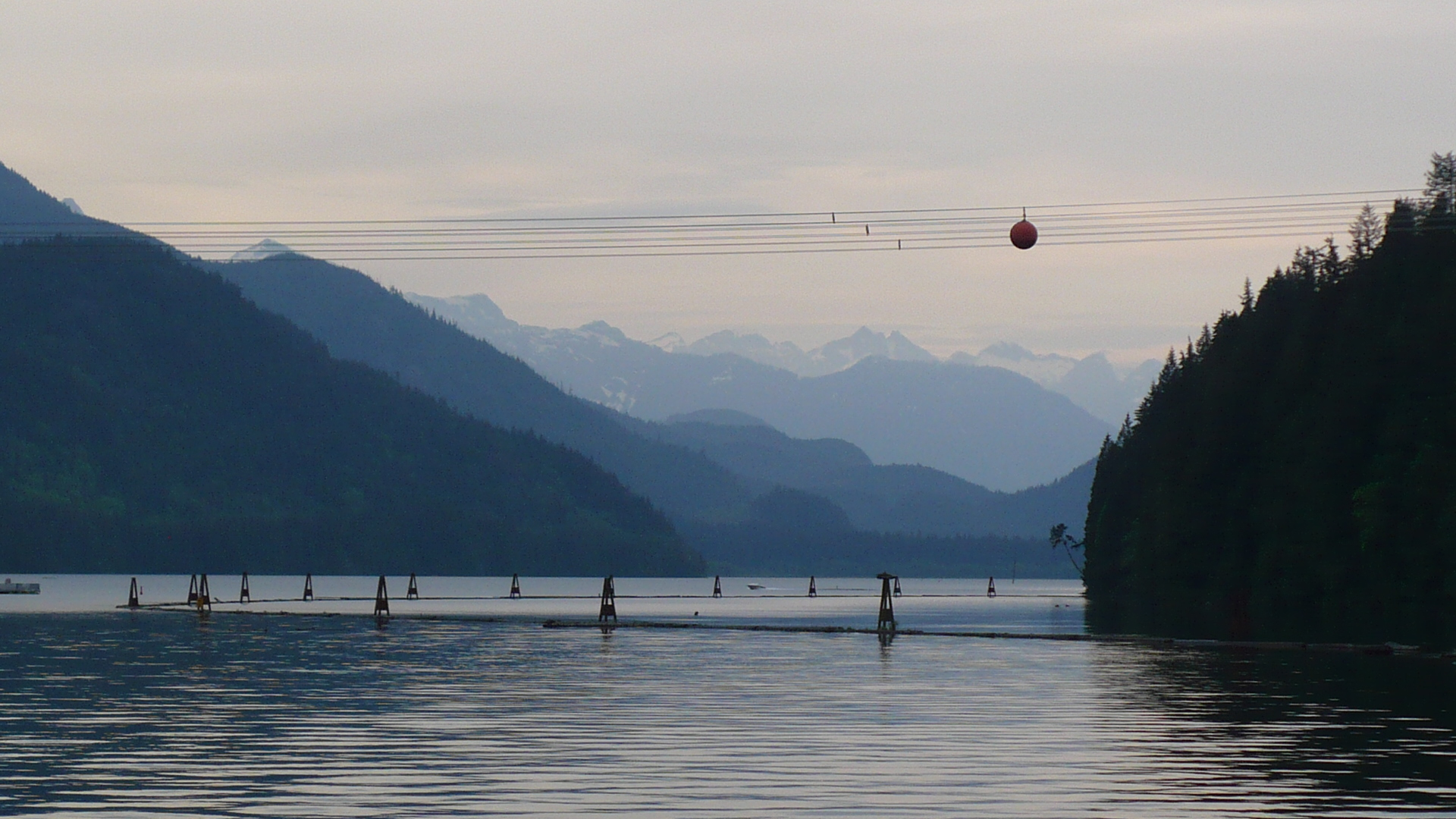

- Location within British Columbia
- Location: Mission, British Columbia
- Coordinates: 49°22′N 122°18′W
- Type: reservoir, natural lake
- Basin countries: Canada
- Surface area: 55 km^{2} (21 sq mi)

Stave Lake is a lake and reservoir for the production of hydroelectricity in the Stave River system, located on the northern edge of Mission City, about 65 km (40 mi) east of Vancouver, British Columbia, Canada. The main arm of the lake is about 20 km (12 mi) long from north to south and its southwest arm, ending at Stave Falls Dam near Stave Falls, is about 9.5 km (5.9 mi) long. The total area of the lake currently is about 55 square kilometres (21 square miles). Prior to construction of the dam, the lake was about one-third the size of its current main arm.

The Stave River, the traditional territory of the Sxa'yaks (Skayuks), a vanished Halqemeylem-speaking Coast Salish people related to today's Sto:lo, was a productive salmon river. The Skayuks demise was caused by the introduction of smallpox by the Europeans and subsequent expansion by the Kwantlen First Nation. The presence of large red cedar trees attracted lumber companies, notably Stave Lake Cedar, whose mill was a mile above the damsite. The lower portion of the Stave is called Hayward Lake, formed by Ruskin Dam and formerly a canyon similar to Capilano and Lynn Canyons, and at its head in the grounds of the one-time community of worker's housing, there is a recreation area there and the beginning of a lakeside trail using the right-of-way of a railway line.

== Climate ==
Stave Lake has an oceanic climate (Köppen climate type Cfb). The average annual precipitation is 2,359.4 mm (92.89 in). Extremes vary from −26.7 °C (−16.1 °F), recorded on January 31, 1929, to 40.0 °C (104.0 °F), recorded on June 25, 1925.

Climate data for Stave Lake (Stave Falls) (Elevation: 110m) 1981−2010
Month	Jan	Feb	Mar	Apr	May	Jun	Jul	Aug	Sep	Oct	Nov	Dec	Year
Record high °C (°F)	16.5 (61.7)	19.4 (66.9)	27.2 (81.0)	32.2 (90.0)	35.6 (96.1)	40.0 (104.0)	39.4 (102.9)	38.9 (102.0)	36.7 (98.1)	30.0 (86.0)	20.0 (68.0)	19.4 (66.9)	40.0 (104.0)
Mean daily maximum °C (°F)	5.6 (42.1)	8.0 (46.4)	10.6 (51.1)	14.7 (58.5)	17.8 (64.0)	20.5 (68.9)	23.7 (74.7)	24.0 (75.2)	21.4 (70.5)	14.1 (57.4)	8.7 (47.7)	5.4 (41.7)	14.5 (58.1)
Daily mean °C (°F)	3.1 (37.6)	4.4 (39.9)	6.6 (43.9)	9.8 (49.6)	12.8 (55.0)	15.5 (59.9)	18.1 (64.6)	18.3 (64.9)	15.9 (60.6)	10.5 (50.9)	6.0 (42.8)	3.0 (37.4)	10.3 (50.5)
Mean daily minimum °C (°F)	0.6 (33.1)	0.9 (33.6)	2.5 (36.5)	4.9 (40.8)	7.8 (46.0)	10.4 (50.7)	12.4 (54.3)	12.7 (54.9)	10.3 (50.5)	6.9 (44.4)	3.3 (37.9)	0.7 (33.3)	6.1 (43.0)
Record low °C (°F)	−26.7 (−16.1)	−15.6 (3.9)	−12.2 (10.0)	−4.4 (24.1)	−1.1 (30.0)	1.7 (35.1)	1.1 (34.0)	3.3 (37.9)	−1.1 (30.0)	−5.6 (21.9)	−13.9 (7.0)	−23.3 (−9.9)	−26.7 (−16.1)
Average precipitation mm (inches)	300.7 (11.84)	211.1 (8.31)	215.7 (8.49)	191.6 (7.54)	148.3 (5.84)	137.7 (5.42)	82.0 (3.23)	81.7 (3.22)	102.7 (4.04)	235.6 (9.28)	370.8 (14.60)	281.6 (11.09)	2,359.4 (92.89)
Average rainfall mm (inches)	265.0 (10.43)	197.9 (7.79)	210.3 (8.28)	191.4 (7.54)	148.3 (5.84)	137.7 (5.42)	82.0 (3.23)	81.7 (3.22)	102.7 (4.04)	235.6 (9.28)	363.2 (14.30)	258.1 (10.16)	2,273.8 (89.52)
Average snowfall cm (inches)	35.7 (14.1)	13.2 (5.2)	5.5 (2.2)	0.2 (0.1)	0.0 (0.0)	0.0 (0.0)	0.0 (0.0)	0.0 (0.0)	0.0 (0.0)	0.0 (0.0)	7.6 (3.0)	27.6 (10.9)	89.6 (35.3)
Average precipitation days (≥ 0.2 mm)	23	17.8	21.1	19.5	18.1	16.2	10.7	10.5	11.6	19.7	23.6	23.0	214.9
Average rainy days (≥ 0.2 mm)	21.2	17.0	21.2	19.5	18.1	16.2	10.7	10.5	11.6	19.7	23.3	21.2	210.2
Average snowy days (≥ 0.2 cm)	4.8	2.2	1.2	0.11	0.0	0.0	0.0	0.0	0.0	0.0	1.3	4.1	13.71
Source: Environment Canada (normals, 1981−2010)

== Dams ==
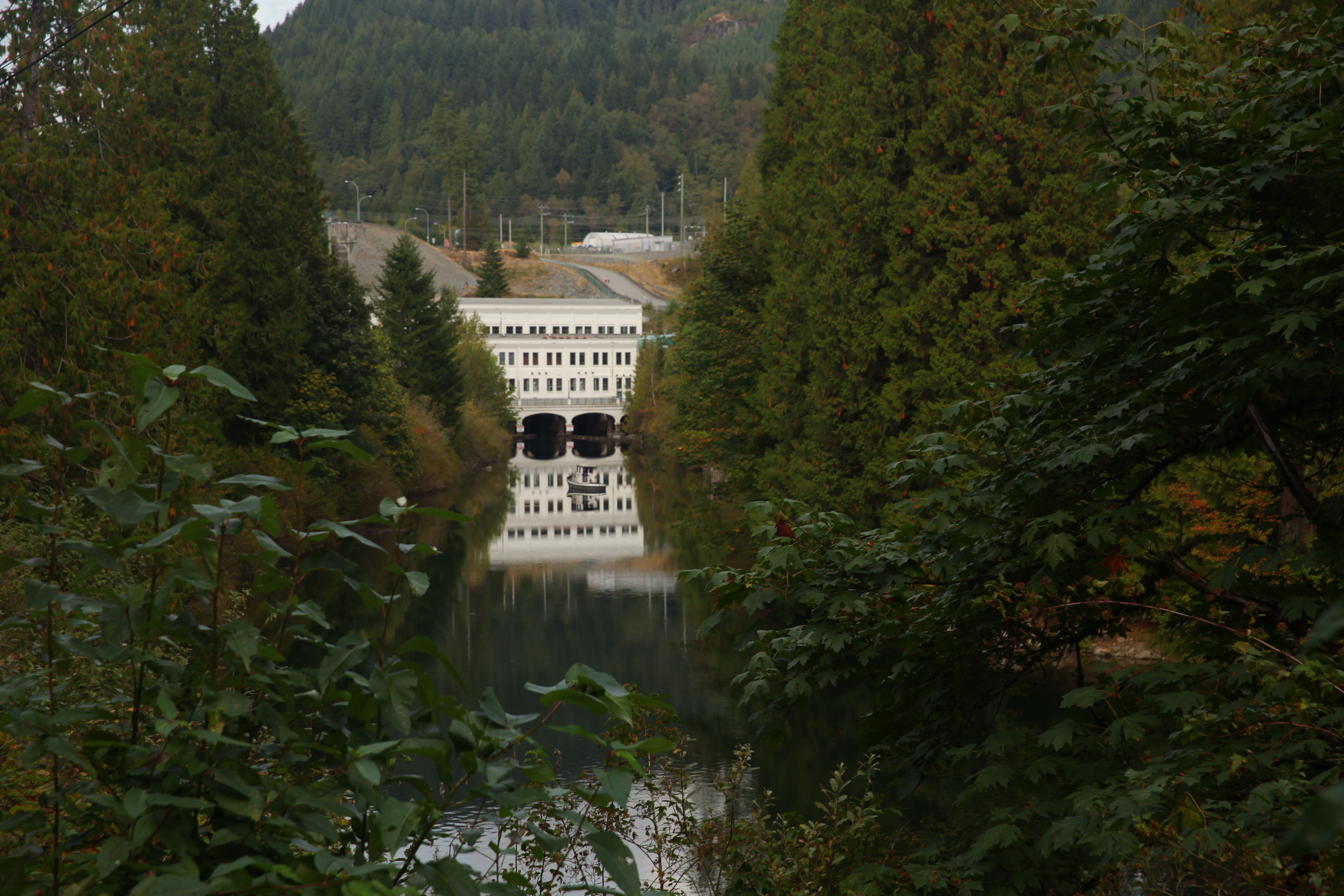
Stave Lake Powerhouse seen from its tailrace

The Stave Falls Power Company, later a subsidiary of the British Columbia Electric Railway, dammed the river in the 1920-22 period. The Stave Falls Dam and Powerhouse, bunkhouses, a community hall, a large workers' community and railway, known as the Stave Falls Branch, were part of these projects. As a result, the Upper Stave was raised and flooded the forests, as was also the case later with Hayward Lake, which was formed by the completion of Ruskin Dam and Powerhouse in 1930. The cedar stood in the river for years, though during the 1980s and 1990s the timber been reclaimed by work crews from a prison camp near Sayres Lake (Cedar Lake), adjacent to the opening from the main arm, by prolonged lowerings of the reservoir level to allow for timber extraction.

After the dam was built, logging lines used the right of way and logged further north into the Stave Valley. The film We're No Angels was partly filmed at the Stave Dam complex, with a large fake town and impressive (and real) timber cathedral built on pilings into Stave Lake. The whole set was dismantled, although a gazebo-type bandstand was moved to the Hayward Lake Recreation Site just below Stave dam.

== Neighbours ==
Most property neighbouring Stave Lake is controlled by BC Hydro. A small number of private cabins are present on the east shores and Zajac Ranch, a summer camp for children with special needs, is on the south west side of the lake. Access to the east side of the lake is available via Sylvester Road. A large raft can be seen on Google's satellite image at coordinates 49.309144,-122.320021 which floats around the lake during the summer months.

== Recreation ==
Stave Lake is a popular 4x4 and dirt-biking location because of its extensive mud flats to the southwest.

== See also ==
- List of lakes of British Columbia
