= Mission, British Columbia =

Mission
- City
- City of Mission
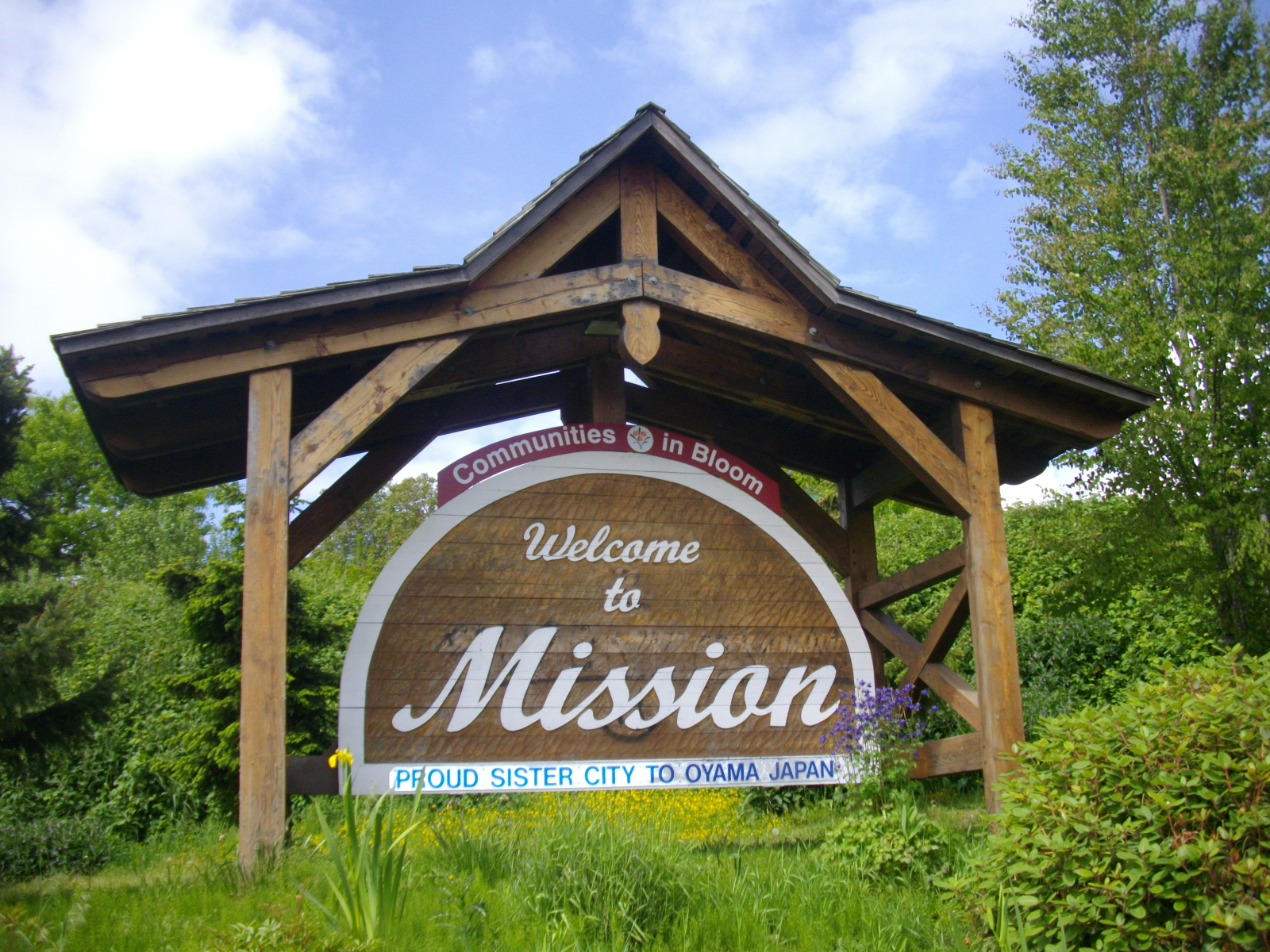
- The "Welcome To Mission" sign located near Horne Street

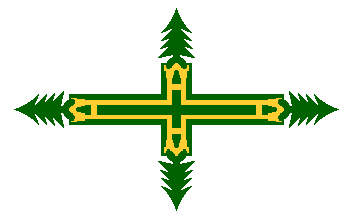
- Flag
- Motto: "The Future Our Mission"
- Location of Mission within the Fraser Valley

- Location of Mission in British Columbia
- Coordinates: 49°08′01.3″N 122°18′40.2″W
- Country: Canada
- Province: British Columbia
- Regional district: Fraser Valley
- Founded: 1868
- Incorporated: 1892
- Incorporated (city): March 29, 2021

Government
  - Mayor: Jag Gill

Area
  - Total: 227.65 km^{2} (87.90 sq mi)

Population (2021)
  - Total: 41,519
  - Density: 170.6/km^{2} (442/sq mi)
- Time zone: UTC-7 (PDT)
- Forward sortation area: V2V, V4S
- Area codes: 604, 778, 236, 672
- Website: mission.ca

Mission is a city in the Lower Mainland of the province of British Columbia, Canada. It was originally incorporated as a district municipality in 1892, growing to include additional villages and rural areas over the years, adding the original Town of Mission City, which had been an independent core of the region, in 1969. It is bordered by the city of Abbotsford to the south and the city of Maple Ridge to the west. To the east are the unincorporated areas of Hatzic and Dewdney.

It is situated on the north bank of the Fraser River, backing onto mountains and lakes overlooking the Central Fraser Valley 65 km (40 miles) southeast of Vancouver.

== Geography ==
Unlike the other Fraser Valley municipalities, Mission is mostly forested upland with only small floodplains lining the shore of the Fraser River. Some benches of farmland rise in succession northwards above the core developed area of the city. Mission was once the heart of the berry industry in the Fraser Valley, with "Home of the Big Red Strawberry" as Mission's slogan in the 1930s and into the 1940s.

The more southerly portion of the municipality is bounded on the west by the lower reaches of the Stave River, which consists mostly of the lakewaters of two hydroelectric reservoirs, Stave Lake and Hayward Lake. Although the vast majority of the population of Mission lives well to the east of the Stave, over 50% of the northern land area of the municipality is west and north of that river; its extreme northwest corner is on the far side of upper Alouette Lake. A small portion of the lower Stave still runs free in its last two miles before its confluence with the Fraser at Ruskin; its last three-quarters of a mile forms the border with the larger municipality of Maple Ridge to the west.

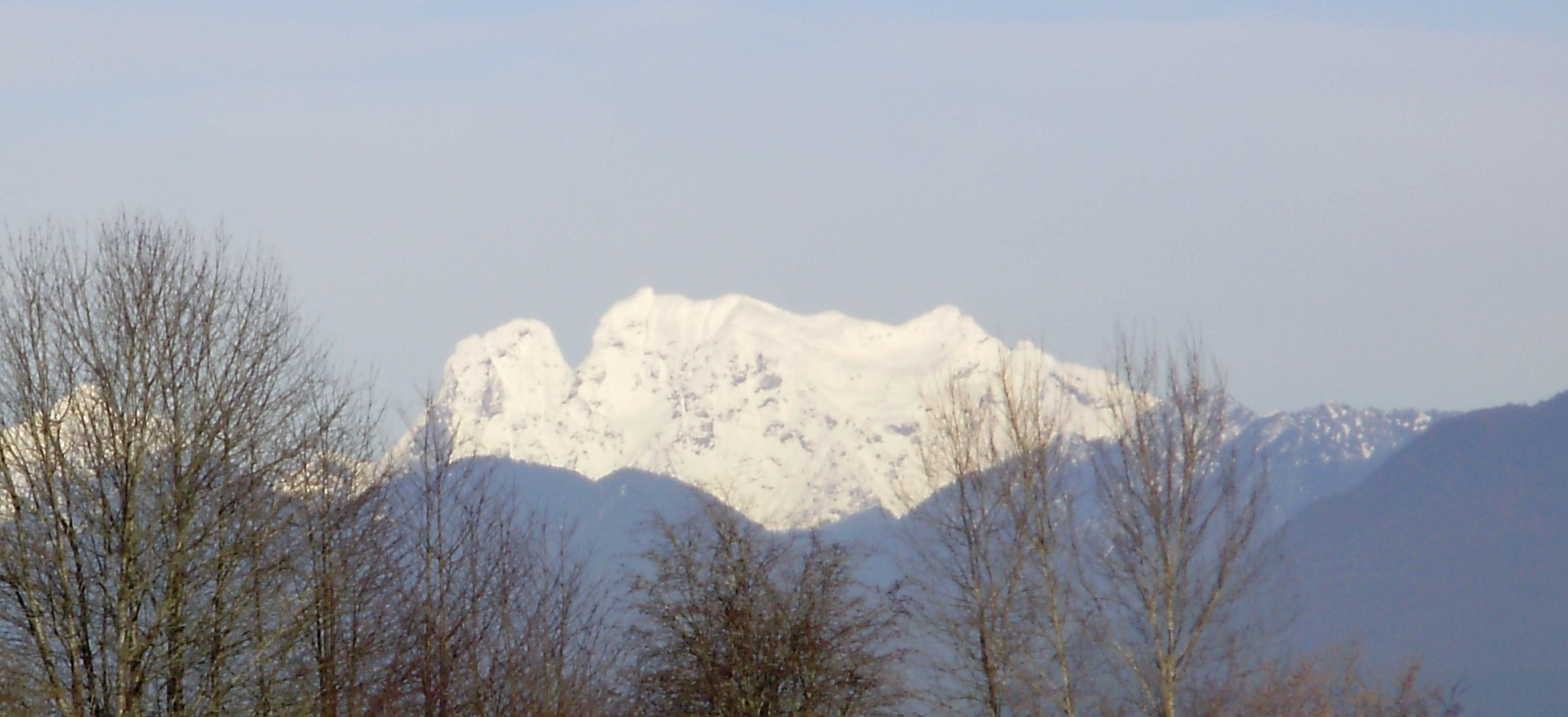
Mount Robie Reid lies just past Mission's northern boundary.

Over 40% of Mission is tree farm, making it one of two communities with municipal tree farms (the other being Revelstoke, with a much smaller and newer farm). Mission's tree farm celebrated its 50th anniversary in 2008. Mission's Municipal Forest is known as Mission Tree Farm Licence #36 and managed by the City of Mission's Forestry Department. It comprises much of the northern part of the district, including the area west of the Stave River, up to the district's northern boundary near the foot of Mount Robie Reid; a small sliver of Mission District is at the head of Alouette Lake (normally thought of as being in Maple Ridge).

The eastern boundary of the municipality roughly coincides with the division between the Mission upland and the alluvial floodplain of Hatzic Prairie, which resembles much of the rest of the Fraser Valley Lowland. The unincorporated communities from Hatzic eastwards through Dewdney and Nicomen Island to Deroche are part of the social and commercial matrix centred on Mission but have never joined the municipality, as is also the case with areas north of Hatzic and Dewdney such as McConnell Creek and Durieu; the local economy and societies are built on dairy, berry and corn farming as well as a large First Nations community at the Indian Reserves of the Leq' a: mel First Nation, formerly known as the Lakahahmen First Nation, on Nicomen Island and Deroche.

== Government ==
Mission was incorporated in 1892 and is 225.78 km^{2} (87.17 sq mi) in size. In 1922 the District of Mission was partitioned by the creation of the Village of Mission, which later became the Village of Mission City, then the Town of Mission City, until amalgamated with the District by plebiscite in 1969.

The City of Mission operates under a Council-Manager system of local government. The municipal council was elected on October 15, 2022, and Jag Gill serves as the mayor of Mission, having been elected by acclamation in September 2026. He succeeded Paul Horn.

Previous mayor Pam Alexis resigned in November 2020 after winning a seat in the Legislative Assembly of British Columbia for the provincial riding of Abbotsford-Mission.

== History ==
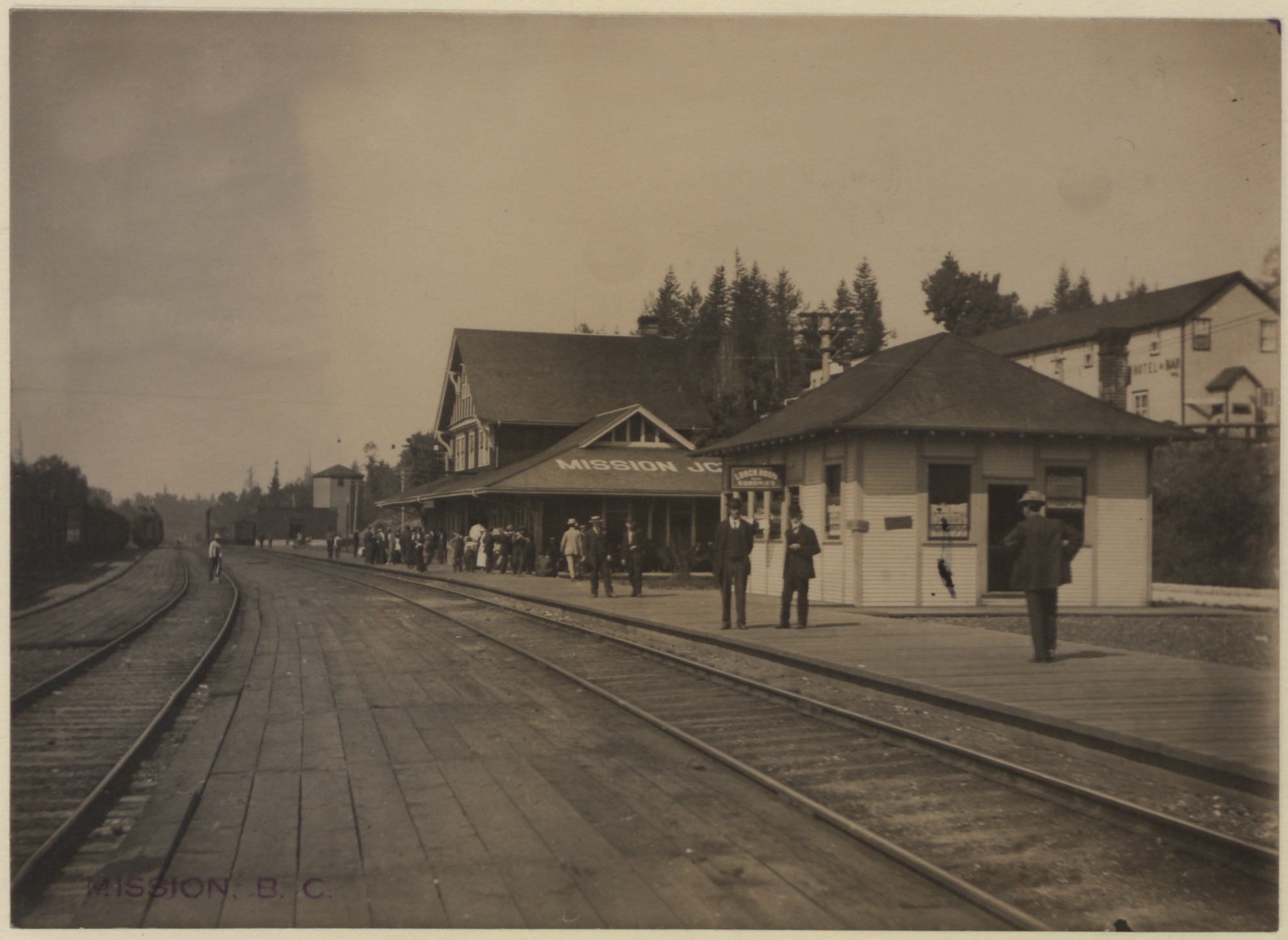
Mission's old CPR train station in 1910

The Town of Mission City took its name from the local St. Mary's Mission and Residential School established earlier in 1861 and began as a land promotion. The town's core commercial properties and residential streets were auctioned off through James Horne's auction, the "Great Land Sale" May 19, 1891, with buyers brought in via the CPR mainline from Vancouver as well as from Eastern Canada. Soon afterwards, Harry Brown French, an American from New York, came to the city and founded the Mission Regional Chamber of Commerce on June 19, 1893. It was the first Board of Trade in B.C." Some of the early houses and commercial buildings were, in fact, specifically designed to be reminiscent of small towns in southern Ontario in order to encourage buyers. Hailed at the time as a new metropolis, the fledgling town's location at the junction of the Canadian Pacific Railway mainline with a northward extension of the Burlington Northern Railroad brought name suggestions that included East Vancouver and North Seattle. The name Mission City was chosen due to the site's proximity to the historic St. Mary's Mission of the Oblate order just east of town, which was founded in 1868 (now the Peckquaylis Indian Reserve).

At the time of founding, the swing-span Mission Railway Bridge opened in 1891 was the only crossing of the Fraser River in the Fraser Valley below the Alexandra Bridge, and all rail traffic between Vancouver and the United States was necessarily routed through Mission until the New Westminster Bridge at New Westminster was built in 1904. The rail bridge at Mission doubled duty as a one-way alternating vehicular bridge until 1973, when a long-promised new Mission Bridge was finally completed. The bridge's location is geographically important at the head of the tidal bore on the Fraser River, and its water level gauge is an important measure of the Fraser's annual and sometimes dangerously large spring freshet.

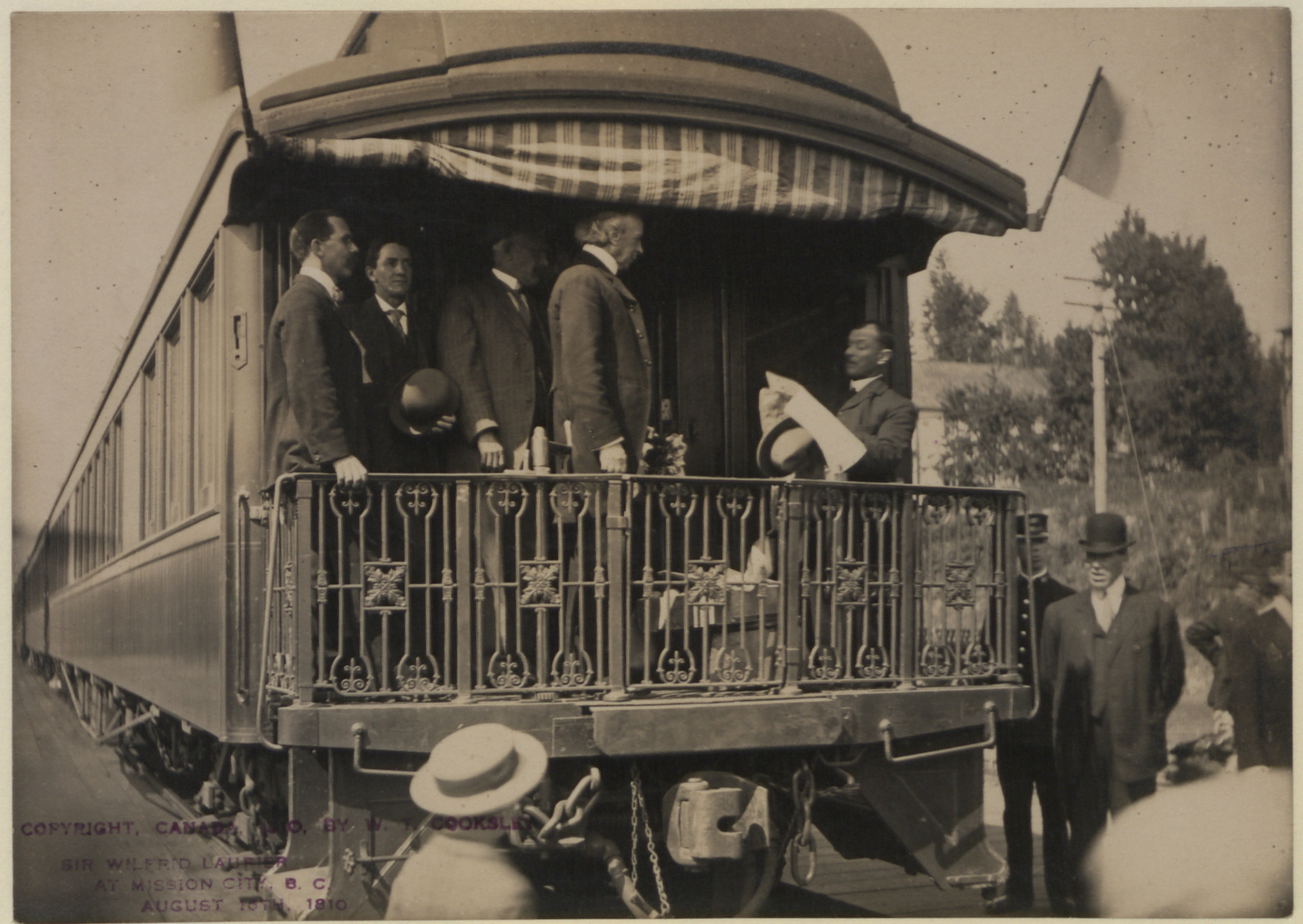
Prime Minister Sir Wilfrid Laurier visiting Mission City, 1910

Mission City's original retail core was in the small area of lowland between the CPR mainline and the river. Following the great flood of 1894 a few years after the town's founding, the core was relocated just north of the rail line at the foot of the hillside rising above the rail junction. This small commercial strip, originally named Washington Avenue, later Main Street and since the 1980s called First Avenue, is only four or five blocks long and was one of the principal commercial centres of the Fraser Valley for many decades and had a lively retail trade and social life. Following the 1894 flood, abandoned buildings and lots in the old downtown were taken over by Chinese merchants and workers, creating a Chinatown which lasted until the 1920s.

The western part of the district, the Stave Valley, is largely rural and forested but its watercourse is home to what was the largest hydroelectric project in British Columbia until the Bridge River Power Project opened in 1961. It was built by the British Columbia Electric Railway (BCER) to provide power to the electric street railway and interurban system in Vancouver. The Stave Falls Power Co. operated a light-gauge railway for passenger and freight service up the lower canyon of the river to the dam at Stave Falls. During the construction of the Ruskin Dam (completed 1931) the railway was rebuilt at a higher elevation so as to skirt the new Hayward Lake reservoir. The rail line has long been discontinued, but the old grade and its trestles are now part of a recreation trail circling the reservoir.

Flanking the outraces of the powerhouse at Stave Falls there was once a fairly large community (300 houses), which was served by the railway via connections to the CPR line at Ruskin, although the (then very rough) Dewdney Trunk Road used the dam to cross the Stave River. Population in the Stave Falls area is now away from the dams, west along the Dewdney Trunk towards Maple Ridge, in a rural farm-and-wilderness area south of Rolley Lake Provincial Park.

Up against the Maple Ridge boundary near the waterfront on the west side of the Stave, and halfway between the dam and the mills at Ruskin, was a large drive-in theatre for many years. It is now a large trailer park, and the most populated of Ruskin's neighbourhoods.

The building of the Highway 1 freeway on the south side of the Fraser in the early 1960s brought huge population growth and large shopping malls to formerly rural Abbotsford, Matsqui, Sumas and Langley; as a result Mission lost its "anchor", the main Eaton's department store in the Valley, and the town's Main Street businesses lost much of their business to the new shopping malls a few minutes away across the river. This process was accelerated with the opening of the new bridge in the mid-1970s.

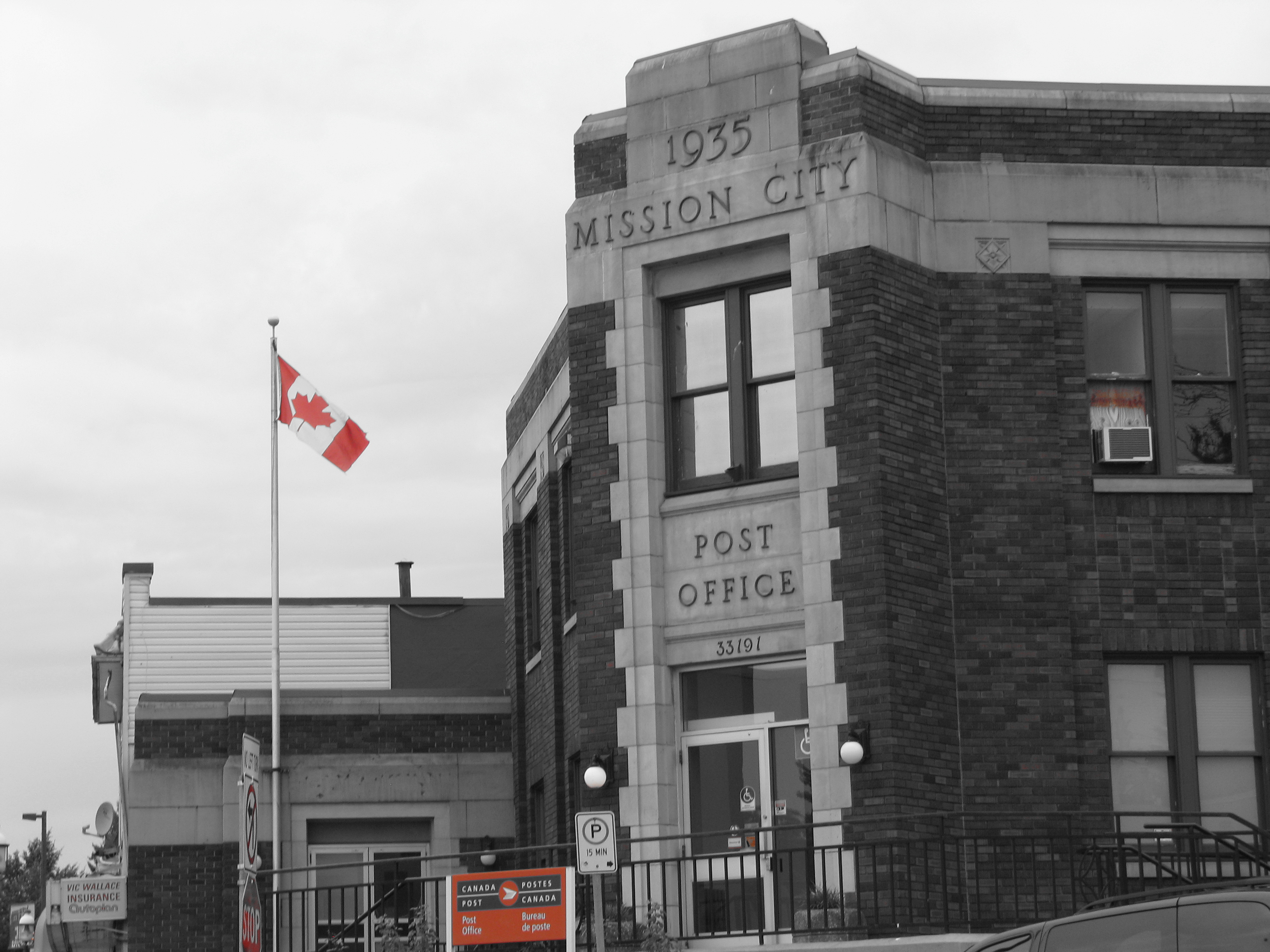
Mission Post Office, First Avenue at Welton Avenue in the heart of Mission's commercial core

Despite a cohesive business community and new retail malls on the edges of the old core, Mission's retail community has never regained its former prominence in the Fraser Valley. Burgeoning "exurban" population growth connected with the rapid growth of the population of the Lower Mainland and encouraged by a new commuter rail line direct to downtown Vancouver, the West Coast Express, has reversed this trend.

Outside of the core "urban" area, most of which had been the Town of Mission City, the former District of Mission was a collection of distinct rural communities, each with their own history and sometimes distinct ethnic flavour. Silverdale, 7 kilometres (4.3 mi) west of Mission on the east bank of the lower Stave River, was homesteaded in the 1880s by Italian immigrants. Neighbouring Silverhill was founded by a Finnish Utopian sect who were superseded by Scandinavian and German settlers following a forest fire that virtually wiped out the Finns.

Steelhead, in the northern part of the district, was originally a weekend retreat for some of Vancouver's press community. Other localities such as Ferndale, Cedar Valley and Hatzic were farming communities of mixed origin, with Europeans and anglicized French-Canadians alongside the usual English-Scottish Canadian mix typical of much of the Fraser Valley. Throughout the Mission area before World War II, there was a large Japanese-Canadian population involved in berry farming, logging and milling and in the fishery on the river.

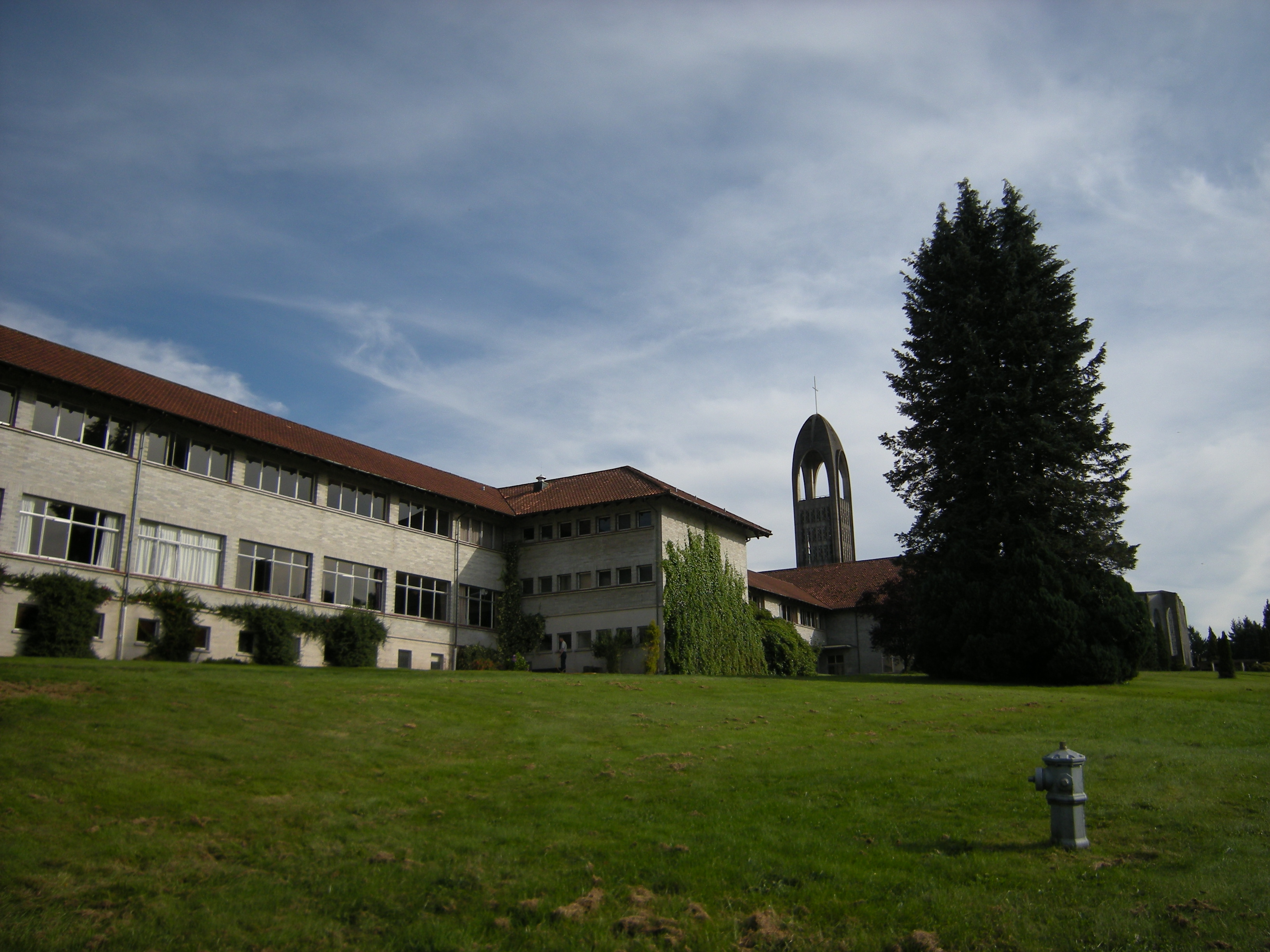
Westminster Abbey

In 1954, Benedictine monks obtained land near Mission, where they set up their Westminster Abbey and Seminary of Christ the King. They have lived there ever since, running their own farm and teaching high school and college men at the seminary.

The berry industry, formerly the district's largest and most important, formed the heart of the town's annual summer party, the Strawberry Festival. The Strawberry Festival began in 1946, when it was suggested by the Board of Trade. But with the impacts on this industry (relocation of the Japanese during wartime and the devastating flood of 1948), the strawberry theme was abandoned. The town acquired the rights to the Western Canada championships of the Soap Box Derby, which were held annually in a specially built facility until 1973; the Derby has been revived in the new millennium.

Mission's other major industry was logging, and the town's several mills were noted for being the world's largest suppliers of red cedar shakes and shingles. The District of Mission has operated for many years its own tree farm, covering most of its northern and northwestern mountainous forests. This tree farm served as a model for silvicultural management on a larger scale throughout British Columbia as well as provided a unique income source for the municipality. From 1967 through the 1970s, the Soap Box Derby shared the July 1 Dominion Day holiday with a large Loggers Sports event, one of the largest in British Columbia and important on the North American Loggers Sports Association circuit.

In the 1960s and 1970s there was a large cluster of productive mills on the waterfront in Mission, for many years world capital of red cedar shake production (the mill at Whonnock outproduced the largest of the Mission mills, but Mission's city of mills was the largest overall producer). Nearby Eddy Match Co., between Mission and Hatzic, was the largest matchstick-making plant in the world until it closed in the 1960s; its only rival was in Hull, Quebec.

Adjoining it was the Empress Foods Co. cannery, the survivor of the struggles of the berry industry in the Central Fraser Valley, and dating from the days of Mission's supremacy as strawberry capital of the valley before the 1948 Fraser River flood wiped it out. In more recent times one of these buildings was for a while converted into the province's largest marijuana grow-op, in a scandal involving one of the town's wealthiest families.

Mission is noted as the home of a long-established professional dragstrip, Mission Raceway Park, which was moved in relatively recent times outside the dyking of the lower part of town to reduce noise in residential and commercial areas nearby.

In 1972 a large tract of land in central Mission's Ferndale area, flat upland at the top of the slope above downtown, was acquired by the federal government and developed into two large penal facilities. One is a minimum security facility, and the other is a medium security prison. The northern part of the district, and the wilds of the Stave River basin to the north of it, are home to a few wilderness work camps for young offenders and low-risk convicts; these camps have over recent decades participated in the ongoing clearing of vast forests of flooded-out trees from the inundated areas of Stave Lake, opening the lake to water recreation and public exploration.

In the 1990s, The Junction Shopping Centre, Mission's largest shopping centre located near the southern tip, was opened to the public.

On March 29, 2021, the District of Mission was reclassified as a city.

== Economy ==
Historically, forestry, hydroelectricity and agriculture were Mission's chief resource sectors and provided the basis for varied related retail and service activities. In recent history, transportation improvements have enabled the manufacturing sector to expand beyond sawmilling and food processing.

Forest and wood related industries dominate the manufacturing sector, with an emphasis on redcedar shake and shingle mills. Mission also holds the only municipal tree farm license in British Columbia.

Agriculture is mostly restricted to a narrow belt along the Fraser River, and the unincorporated Dewdney-Deroche district east of Mission contains the majority of the farms in the area. There are about 96 commercial and hobby farms in the area. Dairy is the chief agricultural enterprise; other income sources include poultry, hogs, beef and vegetables. Approximately 5% of the land mass in the City of Mission is part of the Agricultural Land Reserve.

Mission's largest employer is the local school district, School District #75, and its second largest employer is the District (i.e. the municipality) itself.

== Transportation ==
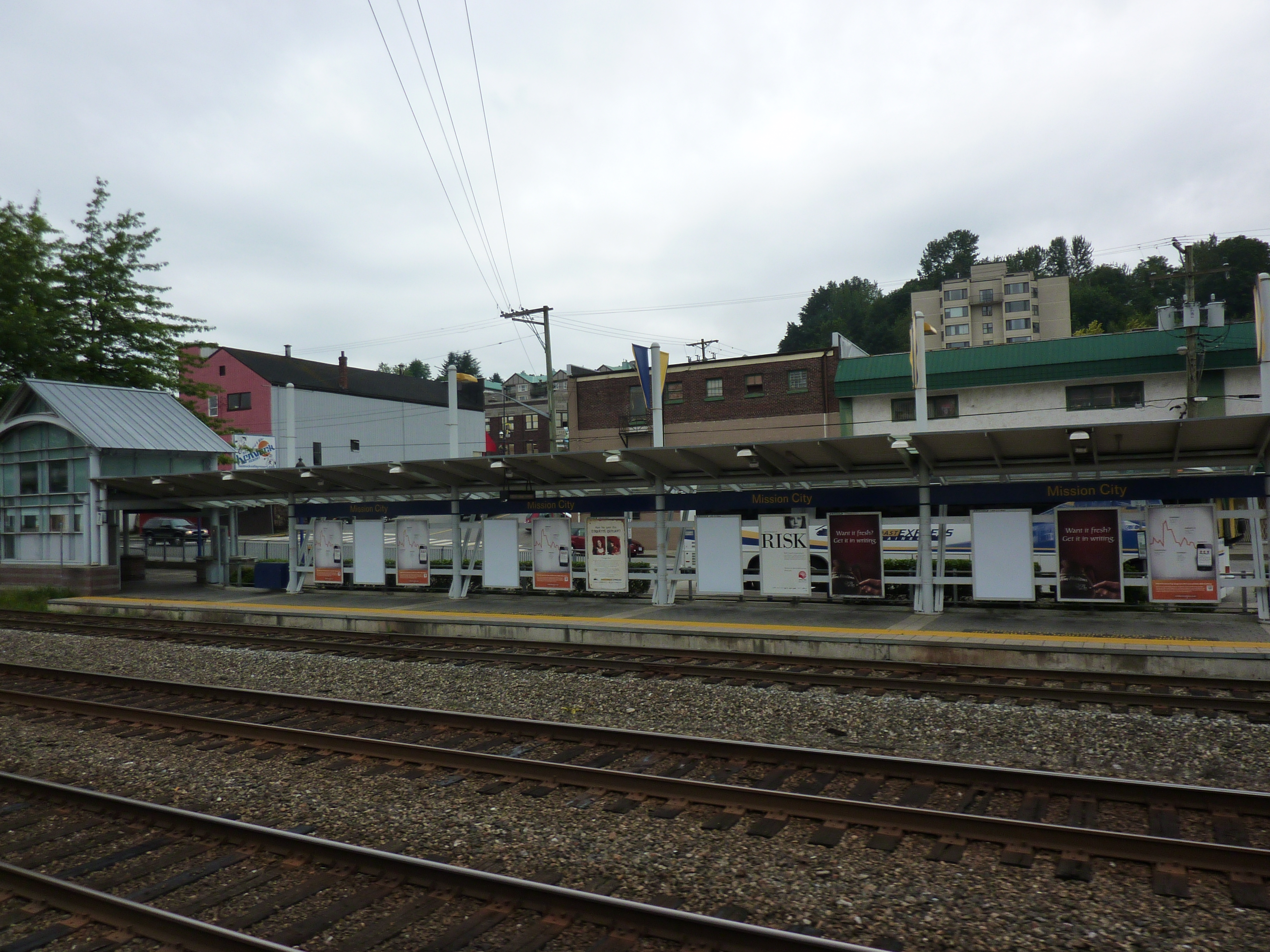
The West Coast Express station in 2011

Transportation infrastructure includes Abbotsford-Mission Highway 11, and the Lougheed Highway 7. Mission is also accessible through commuter rail, the West Coast Express, which runs five trains in each direction a day, five days a week, between Vancouver and Mission City Station. Bus service in Mission is served by the Central Fraser Valley Transit System connecting with the City of Abbotsford, as well as TransLink with service to Coquitlam Central Station via route 701. Three days per week Via Rail's The Canadian provides eastbound flag stop service from Mission Harbour railway station. Westbound service on The Canadian is provided through Abbotsford due to CN and CPR utilizing directional running through the Thompson and Fraser Canyons.

Station
- Preceding station	Via Rail	Following station
  Vancouver One-way operation	The Canadian	Agassiz toward Toronto

Mission differs from some of the other Fraser Valley communities because of its access to the Fraser River. The Fraser near Mission is for the most part undeveloped and unspoiled which makes Mission the launch point for many water based activities that happen year round. Boat tours run from Mission's docks on Harbour Avenue, which are also home to sport and commercial fishing vessels; the Fraser has famous salmon runs and population of green sturgeon.

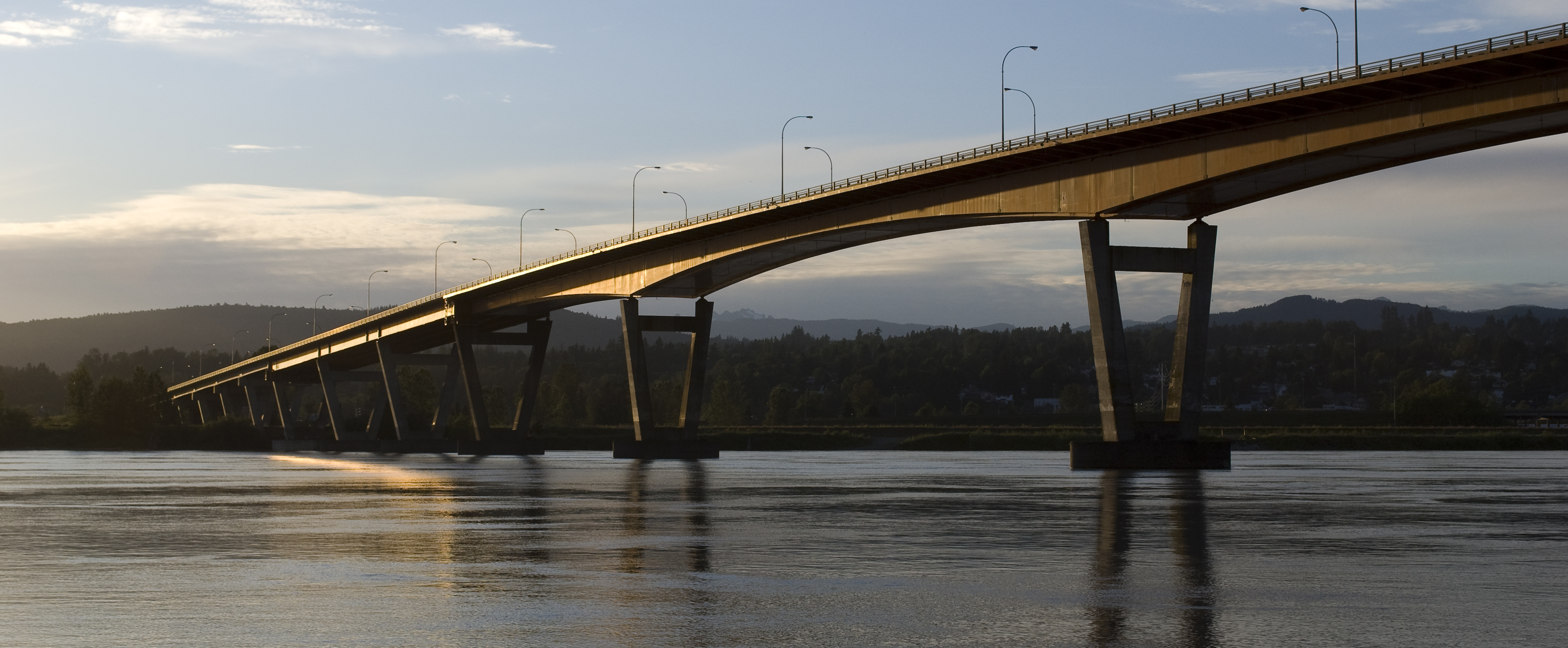
The Mission Bridge carries Highway 11. Following this bridge's opening much of the town's retail business was lost to Abbotsford.

== Climate ==
Mission has an oceanic climate (Köppen climate classification Cfb) due to its proximity to the Pacific Ocean. However, Mission has plentiful rainfall all year round, with a drying trend in the summer.

Climate data for Mission
Month	Jan	Feb	Mar	Apr	May	Jun	Jul	Aug	Sep	Oct	Nov	Dec	Year
Record high °C (°F)	15.6 (60.1)	20.6 (69.1)	22.5 (72.5)	28.0 (82.4)	36.5 (97.7)	42.9 (109.2)	37.8 (100.0)	36.5 (97.7)	36.0 (96.8)	27.0 (80.6)	18.9 (66.0)	17.5 (63.5)	42.9 (109.2)
Mean daily maximum °C (°F)	5.1 (41.2)	8.0 (46.4)	10.9 (51.6)	14.6 (58.3)	17.4 (63.3)	19.9 (67.8)	23.5 (74.3)	23.4 (74.1)	20.9 (69.6)	14.9 (58.8)	8.9 (48.0)	6.0 (42.8)	14.5 (58.1)
Daily mean °C (°F)	2.5 (36.5)	4.7 (40.5)	6.8 (44.2)	9.7 (49.5)	12.6 (54.7)	15.1 (59.2)	17.9 (64.2)	18.0 (64.4)	15.6 (60.1)	10.9 (51.6)	6.1 (43.0)	3.5 (38.3)	10.3 (50.5)
Mean daily minimum °C (°F)	−0.2 (31.6)	1.3 (34.3)	2.7 (36.9)	4.8 (40.6)	7.7 (45.9)	10.3 (50.5)	12.3 (54.1)	12.5 (54.5)	10.4 (50.7)	6.7 (44.1)	3.2 (37.8)	0.9 (33.6)	6.1 (43.0)
Record low °C (°F)	−14.4 (6.1)	−15.5 (4.1)	−12.2 (10.0)	−2.8 (27.0)	−2.2 (28.0)	2.2 (36.0)	4.4 (39.9)	5.0 (41.0)	0.6 (33.1)	−3.5 (25.7)	−13.3 (8.1)	−19.4 (−2.9)	−19.4 (−2.9)
Average precipitation mm (inches)	217.0 (8.54)	190.7 (7.51)	154.6 (6.09)	129.7 (5.11)	102.5 (4.04)	100.6 (3.96)	63.6 (2.50)	74.1 (2.92)	77.9 (3.07)	141.2 (5.56)	252.7 (9.95)	260.1 (10.24)	1,764.5 (69.47)
Average rainfall mm (inches)	197.3 (7.77)	178.8 (7.04)	151.2 (5.95)	129.5 (5.10)	102.5 (4.04)	100.6 (3.96)	63.6 (2.50)	74.0 (2.91)	77.9 (3.07)	141.1 (5.56)	249.1 (9.81)	242.9 (9.56)	1,708.5 (67.26)
Average snowfall cm (inches)	19.7 (7.8)	11.9 (4.7)	3.4 (1.3)	0.2 (0.1)	0 (0)	0 (0)	0 (0)	0 (0)	0 (0)	0.1 (0.0)	3.6 (1.4)	17.2 (6.8)	56.0 (22.0)
Average precipitation days (≥ 0.2 mm)	19.3	16.9	18.0	15.0	15.6	14.4	9.7	9.6	9.8	15.4	20.7	21.6	186.0
Average rainy days (≥ 0.2 mm)	17.3	15.8	17.6	15.0	15.6	14.4	9.7	9.6	9.8	15.4	20.4	19.5	180.1
Average snowy days (≥ 0.2 cm)	4.2	2.3	1.1	0.17	0.03	0	0	0	0	0.06	0.82	3.7	12.4
Source: Environment Canada

== Demographics ==
In the 2021 Census of Population conducted by Statistics Canada, Mission had a population of 41,519 living in 14,098 of its 14,701 total private dwellings, a change of 7.7% from its 2016 population of 38,554. With a land area of 226.98 km^{2} (87.64 sq mi), it had a population density of 182.9/km^{2} (473.8/sq mi) in 2021.

At the census metropolitan area (CMA) level in the 2021 census, the Abbotsford - Mission CMA had a population of 195,726 living in 67,613 of its 70,648 total private dwellings, a change of 8.4% from its 2016 population of 180,518. With a land area of 606.72 km^{2} (234.26 sq mi), it had a population density of 322.6/km^{2} (835.5/sq mi) in 2021.

The community has a young population, with a median age of 36.4, according to the 2001 Canadian census,

=== Ethnicity ===
The largest group is European Canadian, comprising approximately 74% of the population, but even within that Mission's ethnic makeup is very complex, with, in addition to British settlers, large numbers of Germans and Dutch, but also Finns, Norwegians and other Scandinavians, Italians, Hungarians, Poles, anglicized French-Canadians and others.

There is a sizeable First Nations community, forming 8.6% of the population. The Peckquaylis Indian Reserve, which is the former St. Mary's Residential School and its grounds, is a centre for services and governments of the Sto:lo communities in the area to the east.

The largest visible minority group in Mission are South Asians, primarily Indo-Canadians comprising 10.7% of the population. Mission's Indo-Canadian community was active since the early 1900s. An Indo-Canadian volleyball team, "Mission Sikhs", was active in the area. Naranjan Grewall became the first Indo-Canadian elected to public office when he took a position in Mission City's government. According to the 2021 Canadian census, the South Asian population in Mission stood at 4,330 persons, forming approximately 10.7% of the total population, up from 2,220 persons or 6.6% of the total population as of the 2006 Canadian census.

Mission's Japanese Canadian community began in 1904, when Kumekichi Fujino moved to the city. Many issei, or first generation immigrants, included prospective farmers and "picture brides", or women who communicated with suitors through the mail for the purpose of marriage. Organizations established in Mission included the Japanese Farmer's Association (Nokai), established in 1916; the Mission Judo Club; the Mission Buddhist Church; and a Japanese Language School. The ethnic Japanese people in Mission had 979.304 acres (396.310 ha) of land on 103 properties by 1930. During the pre-World War II era 30% of Mission's public school enrollment consisted of ethnic Japanese. The Nokai had 79 members in 1942. The World War II-era Japanese Canadian internment disrupted Mission's ethnic Japanese community as their properties were confiscated, and productivity decreased as the farms were managed by their new non-Japanese. Many Japanese chose not to move back to Mission in the post-war era, even though they were permitted to come back in 1949. In 2006 there were 145 Japanese living in Mission, making up 4.1% of the city's visible minorities.

Panethnic groups in the City of Mission (2001−2021)
Panethnic group	2021		2016		2011		2006		2001	
Panethnic group	Pop.	%	Pop.	%	Pop.	%	Pop.	%	Pop.	%
European (Note: Statistic includes all persons that did not make up part of a visible minority or an indigenous identity.)	29,970	73.77%	29,990	79.99%	29,395	82.88%	28,330	83.72%	26,540	86.76%
South Asian	4,330	10.66%	2,940	7.84%	2,520	7.11%	2,220	6.56%	1,655	5.41%
Indigenous	3,380	8.32%	2,910	7.76%	2,265	6.39%	1,995	5.9%	1,490	4.87%
Southeast Asian (Note: Statistic includes total responses of "Filipino" and "Southeast Asian" under visible minority section on census.)	1,015	2.5%	410	1.09%	100	0.28%	260	0.77%	175	0.57%
East Asian (Note: Statistic includes total responses of "Chinese", "Korean", and "Japanese" under visible minority section on census.)	800	1.97%	520	1.39%	435	1.23%	535	1.58%	305	1%
Latin American	330	0.81%	305	0.81%	175	0.49%	185	0.55%	240	0.78%
African	280	0.69%	260	0.69%	315	0.89%	195	0.58%	85	0.28%
Middle Eastern (Note: Statistic includes total responses of "West Asian" and "Arab" under visible minority section on census.)	240	0.59%	55	0.15%	115	0.32%	65	0.19%	30	0.1%
Other/multiracial (Note: Statistic includes total responses of "Visible minority, n.i.e." and "Multiple visible minorities" under visible minority section on census.)	280	0.69%	90	0.24%	125	0.35%	60	0.18%	60	0.2%
Total responses	40,625	97.85%	37,490	96.54%	35,465	97.36%	33,840	98.07%	30,590	97.82%
Total population	41,519	100%	38,833	100%	36,426	100%	34,505	100%	31,272	100%
Note: Totals greater than 100% due to multiple origin responses.

=== Religion ===
According to the 2021 census, religious groups in Mission included:

- Irreligion (23,160 persons or 57.0%)
- Christianity (12,905 persons or 31.8%)
- Sikhism (3,275 persons or 8.1%)
- Hinduism (380 persons or 0.9%)
- Islam (285 persons or 0.7%)
- Buddhism (275 persons or 0.7%)
- Judaism (55 persons or 0.1%)
- Indigenous Spirituality (35 persons or 0.1%)

== Education ==
School District 75 Mission operates public schools in the District of Mission and in the unincorporated areas to the east. Students from Deroche/Lake Errock, Dewdney, Nicomen Island, Hatzic Island and Hatzic Prairie/Durieu and McConnell Creek elementary schools attend secondary school at Mission Secondary School.

The Conseil scolaire francophone de la Colombie-Britannique operates one Francophone school: école des Deux-rives primary school. There are also French immersion programs at Ecole Christine Morrison Elementary, Ecole Mission Central, Ecole Heritage Middle School and Ecole Mission Senior Secondary.

== Sports ==
Mission has a mix of sport offerings locally standard to any municipality in this region. One exception is the large outdoor trail network within the Tree Farm and Interpretive Forest. Mission is home to mountain bike trails as well as plenty of backcountry hiking opportunities that lie within the District Limits.

Mission is home to a Pacific Junior Hockey League team - the Mission City Outlaws.

Club	League	Sport	Venue	Established	Championships
Mission City Outlaws	PJHL	Ice hockey	Mission Leisure Centre	2003	1

Mission is also home to the Mission Soccer Club (MSC), which was established in 1974 and celebrated 50 years in 2024. MSC calls the Mission Sports Park its home. MSC is a member of the BC Soccer Association and the Canadian Soccer Association. MSC's programming is based on the Canadian Soccer Association and BC Soccer Association Long Term Player Development.

Mission's soccer history is rich, with multiple successes in the Pakenham Cup and Presidents Cup. Mission has won the Pakenham Cup 4 times (1924, 1925, 1950, & 1951) with the honours in 1951 split with Bradner FC. The reason is the longest Pakenham Final on record, lasting well over four hours. After a complete game and three overtime periods, Bradner and Mission decided to call it a draw and share honours.

Mission's Fraser Valley Soccer League Division 2 men's team won the Presidents Cup in 2022 and are the current cup holders for 2024 after dominant displays throughout those tournaments. The same team was league champions in the Division 2A 2021-22 Season and the Division 2B 2022-23 Season.

== Notable people ==
- Braydon Arthur, racing driver
- Brad Booth, professional poker player
- Debbie Brill, High jump athlete
- Eden Donatelli, short-track speedskater
- Todd Ducharme, Ontario Superior Court Justice
- Gage Goncalves, NHL player
- Brent Hayden, Olympic swimmer
- Norman Jacobsen, former logging company owner and British Columbia political figure
- Paul Janz, singer-songwriter
- Carly Rae Jepsen, singer-songwriter
- Margaret Lyons, first female vice-president of the CBC
- Mart Kenney, big band era musician
- Gary MacDonald, Olympic swimmer
- Faber Drive, pop punk band
- Powfu, Hip-hop artist
- Lights Poxleitner, electro-pop singer
- Shannon Shakespeare, Olympic swimmer
- Kim Smith, basketball player
- Graham Wardle, actor

== Neighbourhoods ==
Mission's neighbourhoods include a number of rural localities which were part of the District Municipality before amalgamation and which still have some strong local identity. The following list is incomplete, due to the emergence of modern-era development neighbourhoods, but covers the historical localities (usually defined by a school and a store of the same name):

- Cade-Barr
- Cedar Valley
- Clay Road
- Cherry Hill
- Deroche
- Dewdney
- Historic Downtown- 1st Avenue business strip
- Historic Central Mission- 2nd Avenue to 7th Avenue
- Hatzic
- Hillside
- Ferndale
- Keystone Road
- Silverdale
- Silverhill
- Stave Falls
- Stave Gardens
- Ruskin (also part of Maple Ridge)
- Steelhead
- Richards Road
- West Heights

=== Non-Mission District neighbourhoods ===
Unincorporated communities and rural areas to the east of Mission are linked closely to Mission, partly because of School District No. 75, but also because Mission is the dominant service centre for the north side of the Fraser between Maple Ridge and Agassiz-Kent. These communities include:

- Hatzic Valley
  - Durieu
  - Hatzic Prairie
  - Hatzic Island
  - McConnell Creek
  - Miracle Valley
- Dewdney
- Nicomen Island
- Deroche
- Lake Errock

== Sister cities ==
- Oyama, Shizuoka, Japan, since October 1996

== Freedom of the City ==
The following people and military units have received the Freedom of the City of Mission.

=== Individuals ===
- Abraham "Abe" Neufeld: 2007.
- Valerie Billesberger: 26 April 2022.
- James "Jim" Hinds: 26 April 2022.
- Glen Kask: 26 April 2022.
- Doug Pearson: 26 April 2022.

== See also ==
- Mission Bridge
- Mission Railway Bridge
