= Steelhead, British Columbia =

Coordinates: 49.228°N 122.324°W

Location of Steelhead in British Columbia

Steelhead is a rural community in British Columbia, Canada, located in the northern District of Mission and east of Stave Falls.
