= Rolley Lake Provincial Park =

Provincial park in British Columbia, Canada

- IUCN category II (national park)
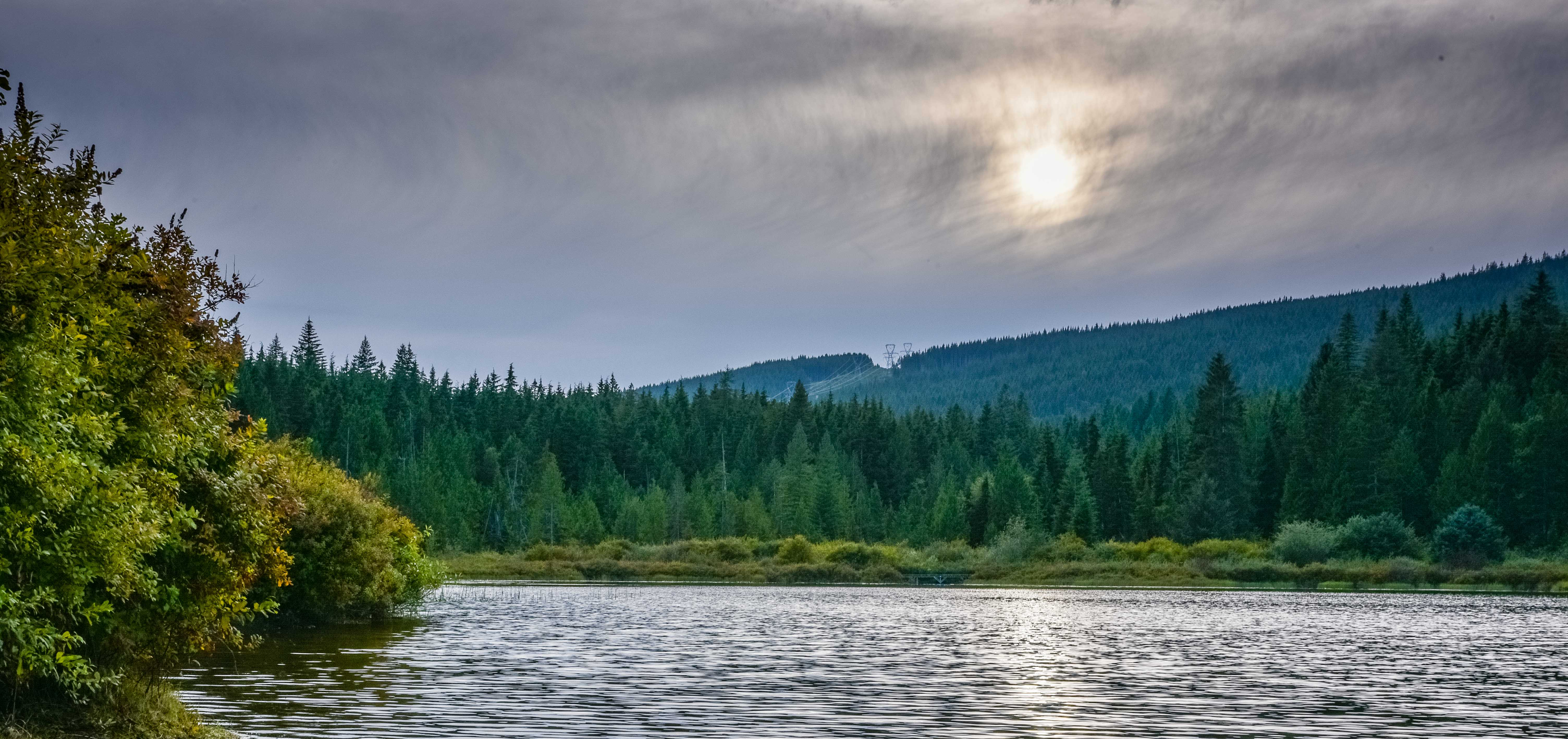
- Rolley Lake

- Location within British Columbia Location within Fraser Valley Regional District
- Interactive map of Rolley Lake Provincial Park
- Location: Fraser Valley Regional District, British Columbia, Canada
- Coordinates: 49°14′35″N 122°23′13″W
- Area: 115 ha (280 acres)
- Established: February 3, 1961
- Governing body: BC Parks

Rolley Lake Provincial Park is a provincial park in British Columbia, Canada. It is located on Rolley Lake in the Stave Falls area of Mission, British Columbia. The area was inhabited by the Sto:lo people, homesteaded in 1888 by James and Fanny Rolley, and later used for logging operations. The park now provides campsites, use of the lake, and hiking, with an area of 115 hectares (280 acres).

Rolley Lake has a day-use area, camping site, and two popular hiking trails. Rolley Lake trail circles the lake and is an easy 3-kilometre (1.9 mi) loop. Rolley Falls hike is a 2.5-kilometre (1.6 mi) out-and-back trail that starts at the campsite and leads to nearby waterfalls.

== Climate ==
Rolley Lake has an oceanic climate (Köppen climate type Cfb). The average annual precipitation is 2,359.4 mm (92.89 in). Extremes vary from −26.7 °C (−16.1 °F), recorded on January 31, 1929, to 40.0 °C (104.0 °F), recorded on June 25, 1925.

Climate data for Rolley Lake (Stave Falls) (Elevation: 110m) 1981−2010
Month	Jan	Feb	Mar	Apr	May	Jun	Jul	Aug	Sep	Oct	Nov	Dec	Year
Record high °C (°F)	16.5 (61.7)	19.4 (66.9)	27.2 (81.0)	32.2 (90.0)	35.6 (96.1)	40.0 (104.0)	39.4 (102.9)	38.9 (102.0)	36.7 (98.1)	30.0 (86.0)	20.0 (68.0)	19.4 (66.9)	40.0 (104.0)
Mean daily maximum °C (°F)	5.6 (42.1)	8.0 (46.4)	10.6 (51.1)	14.7 (58.5)	17.8 (64.0)	20.5 (68.9)	23.7 (74.7)	24.0 (75.2)	21.4 (70.5)	14.1 (57.4)	8.7 (47.7)	5.4 (41.7)	14.5 (58.1)
Daily mean °C (°F)	3.1 (37.6)	4.4 (39.9)	6.6 (43.9)	9.8 (49.6)	12.8 (55.0)	15.5 (59.9)	18.1 (64.6)	18.3 (64.9)	15.9 (60.6)	10.5 (50.9)	6.0 (42.8)	3.0 (37.4)	10.3 (50.5)
Mean daily minimum °C (°F)	0.6 (33.1)	0.9 (33.6)	2.5 (36.5)	4.9 (40.8)	7.8 (46.0)	10.4 (50.7)	12.4 (54.3)	12.7 (54.9)	10.3 (50.5)	6.9 (44.4)	3.3 (37.9)	0.7 (33.3)	6.1 (43.0)
Record low °C (°F)	−26.7 (−16.1)	−15.6 (3.9)	−12.2 (10.0)	−4.4 (24.1)	−1.1 (30.0)	1.7 (35.1)	1.1 (34.0)	3.3 (37.9)	−1.1 (30.0)	−5.6 (21.9)	−13.9 (7.0)	−23.3 (−9.9)	−26.7 (−16.1)
Average precipitation mm (inches)	300.7 (11.84)	211.1 (8.31)	215.7 (8.49)	191.6 (7.54)	148.3 (5.84)	137.7 (5.42)	82.0 (3.23)	81.7 (3.22)	102.7 (4.04)	235.6 (9.28)	370.8 (14.60)	281.6 (11.09)	2,359.4 (92.89)
Average rainfall mm (inches)	265.0 (10.43)	197.9 (7.79)	210.3 (8.28)	191.4 (7.54)	148.3 (5.84)	137.7 (5.42)	82.0 (3.23)	81.7 (3.22)	102.7 (4.04)	235.6 (9.28)	363.2 (14.30)	258.1 (10.16)	2,273.8 (89.52)
Average snowfall cm (inches)	35.7 (14.1)	13.2 (5.2)	5.5 (2.2)	0.2 (0.1)	0.0 (0.0)	0.0 (0.0)	0.0 (0.0)	0.0 (0.0)	0.0 (0.0)	0.0 (0.0)	7.6 (3.0)	27.6 (10.9)	89.6 (35.3)
Average precipitation days (≥ 0.2 mm)	23	17.8	21.1	19.5	18.1	16.2	10.7	10.5	11.6	19.7	23.6	23.0	214.9
Average rainy days (≥ 0.2 mm)	21.2	17.0	21.2	19.5	18.1	16.2	10.7	10.5	11.6	19.7	23.3	21.2	210.2
Average snowy days (≥ 0.2 cm)	4.8	2.2	1.2	0.11	0.0	0.0	0.0	0.0	0.0	0.0	1.3	4.1	13.71
Source: Environment Canada (normals, 1981−2010)
