= Ridge Meadows Speed Skating Association =

Canadian speed skating club

The Ridge Meadows Racers is a short track speed skating club based in Maple Ridge, British Columbia, Canada. Founded in 1979 by George Donatelli, the father of Olympic speed skater Eden Donatelli-Green, the club operates out of the Planet Ice arena. Over its history, the Ridge Meadows Racers has developed numerous high-level competitive skaters and is recognized for its contributions to the sport of short track speed skating in British Columbia, and Canada.

The club offers both high-performance training for athletes and learn-to-skate programs for beginners.

== Coaching ==
The Ridge Meadows Racers are coached by the Donatelli-Green family, including former Olympians Eden Donatelli-Green and Julian Green.

Eden, head coach, has competed at two Olympic Games, seven World Championships, as well as multiple international events and Canadian Championships. She began coaching after officially retiring from competition in 1992.

Julian, Program Director, is a former British Olympian, competing in both short track and long track speed skating. He competed at the 1988 Olympic Games, and 1987 and 1989 World Championships. Julian is also the former Canadian National Long Track Speed Skating Team coach, representing the country at the 1992 Winter Olympics in France. He has coached many skaters to success, including Olympic medalists Catriona Le May Doan and Jeremy Wotherspoon. In 2019, Julian won the Competitions Coach of the Year for Via Sport and the BC Speed Skating Coach of the Year Award.

== Notable Athletes ==
=== Annabelle Green ===
Annabelle Green, daughter of Eden Donatelli-Green and Julian Green, is a current member of the United Kingdom short track speed skating team, representing the country at the World Tour and World Championships. Formerly, Annabelle represented Team British Columbia at the 2019 Canada Winter Games in Red Deer, Alberta.

=== Samuel Green ===
Samuel Green, son of Eden Donatelli-Green and Julian Green, is a former member of Canada's NexGen Short Track Speed Skating Team. At the age of 17, he represented Canada at the 2022 World Junior Championships held in Poland. Samuel holds three British Columbia short track speed skating records, 500m - 42.191, 1000m - 1:26.453, and 1500m - 2:13.434. His 1500m comes only 0.2 seconds slower than the junior world record.

=== Marshall Shupe ===
Marshall Shupe is a former member of the American FAST program, a high-performance team at the Utah Olympic Oval in Salt Lake City. In 2021, Shupe attended the U.S Olympic short track team qualifying event, finishing ninth in the 500m, 15th in the 1000m and 12th in the 1500m.

== Awards ==
Clara Overend Trophy - (2020, 2016, 2015)

Speed Skating BC - Most Competitive Club of the Year (2019)

Speed Skating BC - Most Improved Club of the Year (2013)
