= Eden Donatelli =

Canadian speed skater (born 1970)

Personal information
- Born: July 20, 1970 (age 55) Mission, British Columbia, Canada
- Height: 165 cm (5 ft 5 in)

Sport
- Country: Canada
- Sport: Short track speed skating
- Retired: 1992
Medal record
Women's short track speed skating
Representing Canada
Olympic Games
Silver medal – second place	1988 Calgary	500 m
Bronze medal – third place	1988 Calgary	3000 m relay
World Championships
Gold medal – first place	1987 Montreal	500m

Eden Donatelli (born July 19, 1970) is a Canadian short track speed skating coach and former athlete. Donatelli is an Olympic medalist and ten-time championship medalist in the sport.

Born in Mission, British Columbia, Donatelli became the youngest ever athlete to make the Canadian Senior National Team at only 15 years of age. During her career, Donatelli medaled in ten different World Championships from 1986 to 1992. In the 1988 Winter Olympics, while short track speed skating was still a demonstration sport, she won Silver in the women's 500m event. After retiring from skating, Donatelli married English speed skater and coach Julian Green, and has three children. Together with her husband and father, Eden coaches the Ridge Meadows Racers in Maple Ridge, British Columbia.

== Awards ==
- 1983 - BCSSA Athlete of the Year Award
- 1986 - Canada Tribute to the Champions World Ring Award
- 1986 - BCSSA Athlete of the Year Award
- 1987 - Canada Tribute to the Champions World Ring Award
- 1987 - Government of Canada Tribute to the Champions
- 1987 - BC Junior Athlete of the Year Award
- 1988 - Premiere's Award for Achievement
- 1988 - BC Junior Athlete of the Year Award
- 1988 - Inducted into the Mission, BC Olympic Hall of Fame
- 1990 - Premiere's Award for Achievement
- 1993 - Inaugurated into SSC hall of Fame 1993
- 1994 - BC racing number retired
- 2000 - Inducted into the BC Sports Hall of Fame

== Early life ==
At thirteen months old, Eden began skating at the local ice rink in Mission. Her mother was teaching her 3-year-old brother to skate and she didn't know what to do with Eden while she had her brother on the ice, so she decided to teach them both at the same time. Eden figure skated at the Mission arena at age 3 and then switched to speed skating at age 4. Her father, George, having coached hockey for several years, was her speed skating coach. Her mother, Jane schooled her in Highland Dancing giving Eden plyometric strength and an advantage on the ice. Together they forged a team that quickly made Eden the fastest skater in her own age class and often more senior age classes too. She often competed with children two or three years her senior just to challenge her abilities!

Despite being the fastest female for Team British Columbia in 1983, Eden was not permitted to compete at Canada Winter Games due to her young age; a rule that has since been challenged and defeated by Human Rights Law. That same season she qualified for the Canadian National Training Team at the age of 13 years! As a result, she was never on a provincial team and went directly to representing both BC and Canada at World Championships.

At age 16 Eden competed in her first World Championships in Montreal, Quebec and won a gold medal in the 500m. At the age of 17 Canadian Team rules forced her to move to Quebec to live and train at the National Training Center in order to be part of the Olympic relay team. Not speaking French fluently and living alone in a strange province was extremely difficult for Eden, but she overcame to win silver (500m) and bronze (3000m relay) Olympic medals at the 1988 Olympic games in Calgary. Finally, after two years the National High Performance Committee permitted Eden to be coached by her father again at home in Mission.

== Personal life ==
=== Overview ===
Eden excelled in her home environment and skated at two Olympic games, seven World Championships, Multiple International events and Canadian Championships. It was there that she met her husband, Julian, also a speed skater representing Great Britain, at some of the same events.

Eden's participation in the National Team program meant that she had to miss a great deal of high school. In the summer of grade 10, Eden completed English 11 and Algebra 11 by correspondence so that she would have two less courses to complete during the school year. In the summer of grade 11, she completed grade 12 English by correspondence and then moved to Montreal to train for the ’88 Olympic games. While in Montreal, Eden completed the rest of her grade 12 courses by correspondence and graduated with her class in 1988. Eden attended McGill University in 1988/89 and then moved back to BC to live and train. She took courses at the University of British Columbia and Fraser Valley College. In 1992, after marrying British Olympic Speed Skater Julian Green, Eden moved to Calgary. She was accepted into the Faculty of Education and made the decision to retire from skating in order to focus on her studies. Eden completed her Bachelor of Education at the University of Calgary in 1995. Also in 1995 Eden moved back to Mission, British Columbia and began teaching grade 1 at John Maclure Community School in Abbotsford, British Columbia. Eden completed a Post Baccalaureate Diploma in Curriculum and Instruction at Simon Fraser University in 1998. She also became a Reading Recovery Teacher in 1999. Eden received a master's degree in curriculum and instruction from SFU in 2000.

Eden excelled in speed skating at a time when no other BC female had qualified to the National Short Track Team. Eden was also the only female Anglophone on the Canadian team for many years. She regularly competed against Sylvie Daigle, Natalie Lambert, Susan Auch, Maryse and Annie Perrault, Isabelle Charest and Christine Boudrias. As a young Long Track skater Eden's main competition was Catriona LeMay (Doan).

Her sport was not well known or well televised, and as such she had little or no sponsorship to offset her costs. This meant that her family bore the brunt of her travel, equipment, and training expenses, as well as those of her father/coach. Eden benefited from the support of her home community of Mission and the Mission Racers Speed Skating Club. Her coaches included Clara Overend, Dennis Brain, Sandra Clements, Larry Lewin, and her father, George Donatelli.

Feeling a need to share her experiences to children, Eden was part of the Athlete's Motivation Excellence Program 1988–1991. She also began coaching after retiring from competition in 1992. She currently coaches with her dad and her husband at three local clubs (Maple Ridge, Sardis and Langley). Aside from coaching six days a week, Eden presents regularly at Abbotsford District teaching conferences and has presented at teaching conferences in Vancouver and Victoria.

=== Legacy ===
"Many rules and laws have been re-thought and re-worded due to her exemplary achievements at such a young age, thus smoothing the difficult road ahead for future generations of young speed skaters. Her inspiring feats have encouraged many young girls and boys to take up the sport of short track speed skating and her coaching skills continue to help them reach their dreams". This is copied from the Ridge Meadows Racers website page introducing Eden Donatelli as Head Coach.
