= Hayward Lake =

- Location within British Columbia
- Location: Mission, British Columbia
- Coordinates: 49.20°N 122.39°W
- Type: reservoir
- Primary inflows: Stave River
- Primary outflows: Stave River
- Basin countries: Canada

Hayward Lake is a lake and reservoir on the Stave River in the Lower Mainland of British Columbia, Canada. Located in the District of Mission about 60 km east of Vancouver, Hayward Lake is formed by Ruskin Dam, which lies about 3 km upstream from the Stave River's confluence with the Fraser River at Ruskin, which sits astride the Mission-Maple Ridge boundary. The lake begins at the tailrace from the Stave Falls Dam and is about 7.5 km in length and an average of 0.5 km wide, with a maximum width of 1.5 km when lengths of small inlets are taken into account.

== History ==
Though cleared of debris since, for many years Hayward Lake was a flooded forest full of dead trees, which had not been logged by the time of the inundation of the canyon of the Stave River, which lies today in the lake's depths behind Ruskin Dam. The original roadbed of the Stave Falls Branch of the British Columbia Electric Railway climbed the canyon walls, now underwater, but the line was rebuilt as part of the construction of Ruskin Dam and its track along the west side of the lake is now a hiking and biking trail. Trestles used by the railway are still present along this route, although their ends have been demolished to prevent access for safety reasons. The west side trail, and a hiking-only route on the east side of the lake, are part of a BC Hydro recreation division project; a park at the lake's upper end, where there had been a townsite during construction of the Stave project, now has a public beach and includes a bandstand built for the filming of We're No Angels above Stave Dam and moved to its present location afterwards.

The lake is named for the first operations manager of the Stave Powerhouse.

== Recreation ==
In addition to the public beach at the Stave Falls end of the lake, there are small beaches along the lakeside trail. Canoeing on the lake is now mostly safe though some "snags" remain; power boats are not permitted, and canoeing or swimming within 1 km of Ruskin Dam is prohibited due to the risk of being sucked into the Ruskin Powerhouse's intakes, with a log-boom drawn across from shore to shore as a reminder.

== See also ==
- List of lakes of British Columbia
