= Mission Regional Chamber of Commerce =

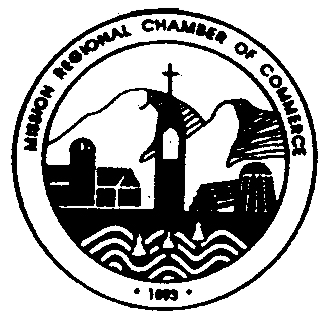
- Founded: 1893
- Founder: Harry Brown French
- Type: Advocacy group
- Purpose: Business Advocacy
- Location: Fraser Valley, Lower Mainland
- Region served: Mission, British Columbia, Canada
- Website: MRCC Website

The Mission Regional Chamber of Commerce (MRCC) is a Canadian non-profit organization that acts as an advocate for economic development in the region and promotes area tourism to visitors and locals.

It serves the businesses of Mission, British Columbia, and acts as a Chamber of Commerce, similar to a Board of Trade.

== History ==
The MRCC was created on June 19, 1893 as B.C.'s fourth Board of Trade by Harry Brown French, an American sent to Mission after the town's founder sold land to a New York railway corporation. French was elected the Board of Trade's first president, and upon its creation the Board took out advertisements in local newspapers, offering a package of free land, free water, free power and property tax exemptions to potential industrialists, as well as offering to construct factories, mills and other commercial buildings at no charge.

In 1946, the Board of Trade suggested that a Strawberry Festival as well as a Soapbox Derby should be held on June 26. The event was successful and visitors travelled from different areas of the Fraser Valley to attend the event. The festival was held annually until 1951, despite an interruption in June 1948 when the Fraser River flooded causing the event to be postponed until July in its third year. In 1951, Langley, BC became the new host of the Strawberry Festival after the decline of berry farming and the increase in employment in the forestry industry in the Mission area.

The organization operated under the name of the Mission City and District Board of Trade until 1961 when its name was changed to the Mission City and District Chamber of Commerce. That name stuck until 1970 when it was changed to the Mission City Chamber of Commerce. In 1977, it was suggested by the organization's Vice President Dave Kenyon that the Chamber of Commerce should be terminated due to poor attendance and lack of participation by members. The Chamber persevered, avoiding termination, and in 1979 the name was changed for the final time to its present name, the Mission Regional Chamber of Commerce. Since then, the MRCC has continued to serve the businesses of Mission and now houses a visitor centre.

== Description ==
The MRCC describes its mission as to "foster a network for entrepreneurial leaders to partner in representation, communication and education." It acts on behalf of local businesses, and as an unbiased advocacy group, they serve as a direct liaison between their members and the local government. They also provide their members with networking opportunities, group benefits, educational seminars, as well as marketing and advertising opportunities.

The MRCC is a member of the BC Chamber of Commerce. It currently has 450 members and prints a monthly newsletter titled "The Business Track". It hosts the Annual Candlelight Parade, the largest nighttime Christmas Parade in Western Canada and draws approximately 13 000 spectators every year.

The original Mission Soapbox Derby is still held annually by the Mission & District Soapbox Derby Association.

== Current President ==
The current president of the Chamber is Celine Dauphney, President and Co-Founder of Urban Valley Transport Ltd., a Mission-based courier and freight service provider.

== Past Presidents ==
Year	President		
1893	Harry Brown French	1979	Dave Kenyon
1909	R.C. Abbot	1980	S. Barwell
1912	W.H. Mathewson	1981	Bob Cummings
1913	R.C. Abbot	1982	Dave Kenyon
1914-1915	A.M Verchere	1983	Stephen Phinney
1917-1919	A.A. Lane	1984-1985	Mart Kenney
1920-1921	F.J. Roche	1986-1987	Jeanne Price
1922	Hope Alanson	1988-1989	Doug Parkinson
1923	S.H. Crosby	1990	Sheila Jones/Ross Quinn
1924	W.G. Gamble	1991-1993	Cal Crawford
1925	Hope Alanson	1994	Doug Thorpe
1926-1927	A.B. Noble	1995	Elaine Howardson
1928	R. McRae	1996	Anne Norder
1929-1930	Rex Cox	1997	C. Stacey Crawford
1931	J. Yool	1998-1999	P. Gordon Wood
1932-1933	A.J. Clark	2000	S. Brad Powell
1934	J. Muir	2001	Lynne Christensen
1935	L.R. Wilson	2002-2003	Ted Adlem
1936	R.C. Cox	2004	Stacey Crawford
1937	G.V. Ogle	2005	Cal Crawford
1938	A.D. McRae	2006	Sheron Vallance
1939	A.N. Lawrence	2007	Stuart Rosenberg
1940	J. Muir	2008-2009	Sean Melia
1941	E.J. Taylor	2010	Helen Secco
1942	T.W. Davies	2011	Cal Crawford
1943-1944	F.C. Lightbody	2012	Elyssa L. Lockhart
1945	Peter Grant	2013	Sean Melia
1946	C.S. Thompson	2014-2015	Ann Harper
1947	A.G. McInnis	2016-2017	David Sawatzky
1948	A.C. Fisher	2018	Andrea Walker
1949	Harry Davis	2019	Raj Patara
1950	C.I. McMurdo	2020	Ellen Nguyen
1951	Albert McMahon	2021	Angel Elias
1952	Frank Kearney	2022	Manny Deol
1953	K.A. "Ken" Shore	2023	Manny Deol
1954	N.S. Thompson	2024	Celine Dauphney
1955	E. "Ted" Boulter	2025	Celine Dauphney
1956	Keith Collver		
1957	Percy Buckle		
1958	R.L. "Bob" Fletcher		
1959	Albert McMahon		
1960-1961	Lang Sands		
1962-1963	Laurie Wainwright		
1964-1965	Vic Wallace		
1966-1967	G.W. Walker		
1968	Bruce Catto		
1969	Paul Jacobs		
1970-1971	George Kummel		
1972	D.C. Trumpour		
1973	Mart Kenney		
1974	J.A. Gagnon		
1975	Dr. R.C. Barwell		
1976	Bob Cummings		
1977	G.H. (Bert) Chapman		
1978	Dr. R.C. Barwell		

== MASCOT ==
Stan the Sturgeon is the Ambassador for the Mission BC Visitor Centre. His primary role is to advise on all up-coming community events and to promote tourism within the region. This is achieved through social media outlets including Facebook and Twitter. Stan is regularly booked to attend local events and school field trips. Find him via Facebook - Mission BC Visitor Centre or Twitter Stansturgeon1
