= Julian Green (speed skater) =

British speed skater

Personal information
- Full name: Julian Walter Green
- Nationality: British
- Born: 3 November 1965 (age 60) Birmingham, England
- Height: 173 cm (5 ft 8 in)

Sport
- Sport: Speed skating

Julian Walter Green (born 3 November 1965) is a Canadian speed skating coach and former British Olympic athlete.

== Coaching ==
Green is the current Program Director of the Ridge Meadows Speed Skating Association and Head Coach of the Langley Blades Speed Skating Club. He is a fully certified level 4/5 N.C.C.P Coach, the highest level of coaching offered in British Columbia.

During the 1992 Winter Olympics in Albertville, France, Green coached the Canadian National Long Track Speed Skating Team, mentoring Olympic medalists including Jeremy Wotherspoon and Catriona LeMay Doan along with others. He also coached the Canadian National Team at various World Championships and World Cups.

Green won the 2019 Competitions Coach of the Year Award for Via Sport, and the 2019 BC Speed Skating Coach of the Year Award.

== Career ==
Born in Birmingham, England, Green began skating with the Mohawks Ice Racing Club in Solihull, England.

He competed in four events at the 1988 Winter Olympics in Calgary, earning 37th in both the 1500m and 5000m, 36th in the 1000m, and 30th in the 10,000m.

Green competed in his only World Cup races at the beginning of the 1987/88 season in Heerenveen, finishing 41st in the 1500m and 40th in the 5000m. Later that season, he finished 29th in the all-around competition at the 1988 European Allround Championships in The Hague. His last international appearance was the following year at the European Allround Championships in Gothenburg, where he again finished 29th in the all-around competition.

Green currently holds the National Record in the 10,000 m for the United Kingdom.

== Personal Bests ==
Discipline	Time	Date	Location
500 m	40.17 s	December 14, 1987	Heerenveen
1000 m	1:20.33 min	January 9, 1988	Baselga di Piné
1500m	1:59.41 min	February 13, 1988	Calgary
3000 m	4:13.40 min	January 17,1988	Heerenveen
5000 m	7:13.20 min	February 13, 1988	Calgary
10,000 m	14.59.53 min	February 13, 1988	Calgary
