= Stave River =

Coordinates: 49°10′00″N 122°25′00″W

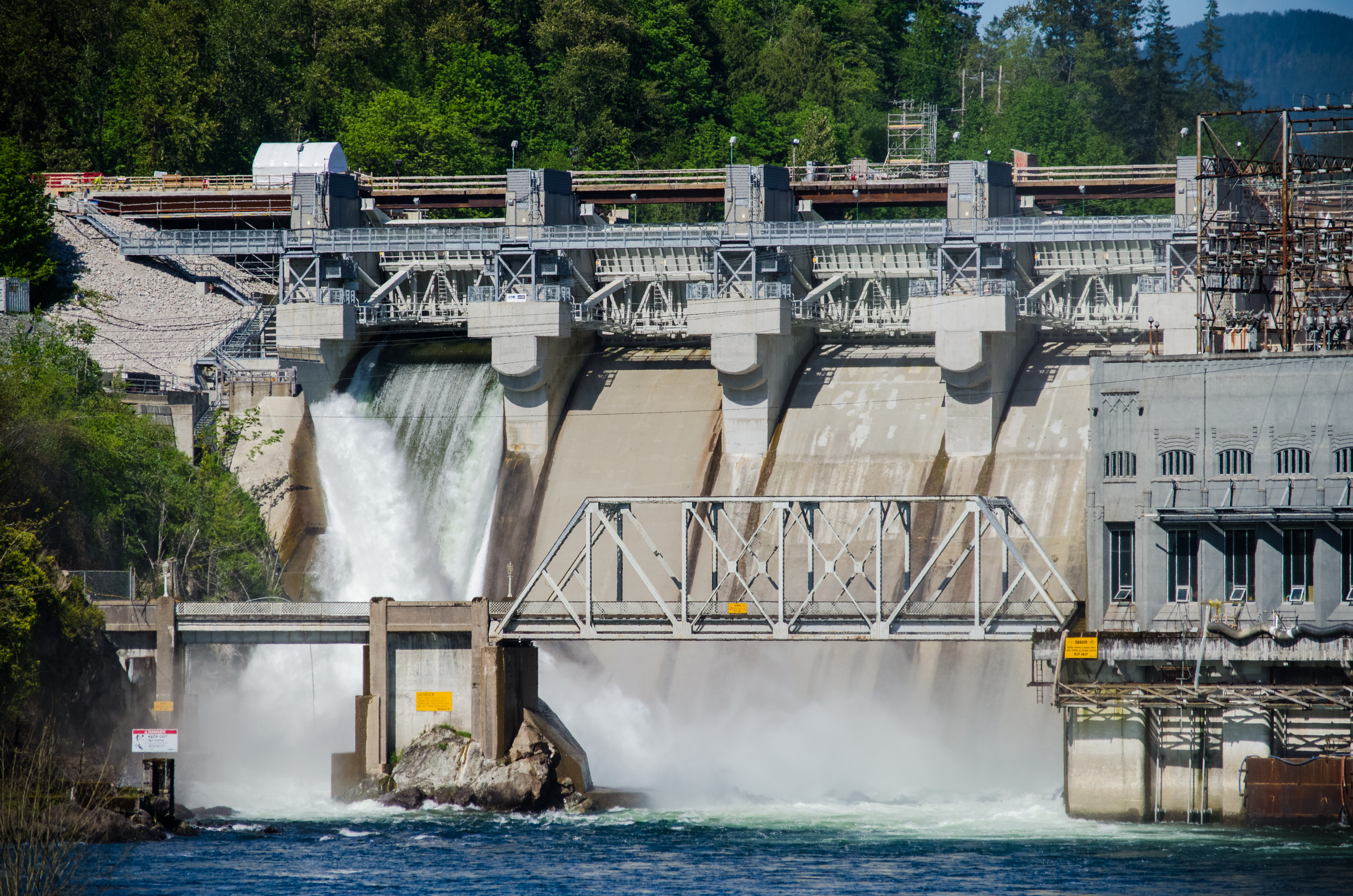

Location
- Country: Canada
- Province: British Columbia
- District: New Westminster Land District
- Cities: Mission, Maple Ridge

Physical characteristics
- Source: Stave Glacier
  - location: Garibaldi Ranges
- Mouth: Fraser River
  - location: Ruskin (on Mission-Maple Ridge boundary

The Stave River is a tributary of the Fraser, joining it at the boundary between the municipalities of Maple Ridge and Mission, about 35 kilometres (22 mi) east of Vancouver, British Columbia, Canada, in the Central Fraser Valley region.

Blocked since the 1920s by two dams built by the BC Electric Railway at Stave Falls and one at Ruskin, the only free-flowing parts of the Stave today are the 3 kilometres (1.9 mi) between Ruskin Dam and the Fraser and the 45 kilometres (28 mi) from its source in Garibaldi Provincial Park to the head of Stave Lake. Prior to power development the total length of the river was c. 85 kilometres (53 mi).

== History ==
The name Stave River was conferred in about 1828 by Hudson's Bay Company employees at Fort Langley, as the forests lining its banks were preferred for the production of staves used in the making of barrels for the export of fish.

== Terrain ==
The lower Stave valley comprises over half the surface territory of the District of Mission although it remains mostly forested mountainside. The terrain of the lower valley is gentle though hilly, with dense oldgrowth and dense deciduous second growth in some areas. Marginal farms, mostly pastures carved out of the forests, can be found in the Silverhill, Silverdale and Stave Gardens areas. The Stave delta, formerly an oxbow lake, has been partly drained and dyked to form Silvermere Lake, part of a 1950s vintage real estate development; the oxbow's central island was transformed by the dredgings into a hill upon which the developer's private estate was built. It is now a Royal Canadian Mounted Police training facility.

The waters of the lower Stave are semi-tidal, as the tidal bore on the Fraser River ends farther upstream at Mission City. During the spring freshet of the Fraser the volume and force of that river's flow blocks the Stave, causing it to back up and forming a lake between the Fraser and Ruskin Dam.

North of Stave Lake the Stave's valley is intensely mountainous, containing some of the most rugged terrain in the province and also some of its highest rainfalls; access is extremely difficult. Overlooking Stave Lake at its north end are Mount Judge Howay, elevation 2,262 metres (7,421 ft), and Mount Robie Reid, elevation 2,095 metres (6,873 ft), and nearby are Robertson Peak at 2,252 metres (7,388 ft) and many other summits. The upper Stave basin forms the southeastern part of Garibaldi Provincial Park, and adjoining it on its southeast is the Judge Howay Provincial Recreation Area - designated for recreation but highly inaccessible other than to seasoned mountaineers.

== Fishery ==
The original salmon fishery was severely affected by the damming of the river but its lower stretches remain popular with sport fishermen, especially in search of steelhead. The hydro corporation has worked in cooperation with the federal Department of Fisheries and Oceans to rework the gravel bars and channels below Ruskin Dam, but this has had only marginal effect relative to the former size of the salmon runs. Stave and Hayward Lakes have a kokanee population as well as other fish such as trout, and are sometimes stocked.

== Industry ==
The Stave River's valley has been extensively logged. The only operating mills on its length are now near the Fraser at Ruskin but there are a few ruins of mills lining its western shore, including the remains of a very large cedar shake mill adjacent to the Stave Falls dam. Almost all of the mills on the Stave were focused on the production of shakes and some of its mills were among the highest-producing in the world. The north end of the lake can not be reached by road so the only option is by boat or air charter to a small bush strip.

== Hydropower developments ==
There are Stave Falls Dam (1912), Ruskin Dam (1930) and the Alouette Dam (1928) on the shore of Stave Lake where a diversion from Alouette Lake comes through a low mountainside. On the upper Stave River, beyond the north end of Stave Lake there are two run-of-the-river hydroelectricity projects, Lamont Creek (28 MW) and Upper Stave River (33.5 MW) both built in 2010 by Cloudworks Energy Inc. a private company based around the BC government's Independent Power Projects (IPP's) legislation, which guarantees such producers sales to BC Hydro.

== See also ==
- List of rivers of British Columbia
- List of tributaries of the Fraser River
- Silvermere Lake
