= Stave Falls =

Stave Falls is a rural community located in northwestern Mission, British Columbia, Canada, about 40km east of Vancouver. Noted for the iconic Stave Falls Dam and beautiful Rolley Lake Provincial Park and Stave Lake reservoir.

Stave Falls is the area of Mission, British Columbia bordered by the West bank of the Stave River, the end of Stave Lake to the North, the Maple Ridge, British Columbia/Mission boundary on the West, and Ruskin Dam and Powerhouse to the South.

== See also ==
- Stave Lake
- Rolley Lake Provincial Park
- Stave Falls Dam
