= Ruskin Dam and Powerhouse =

Ruskin Dam
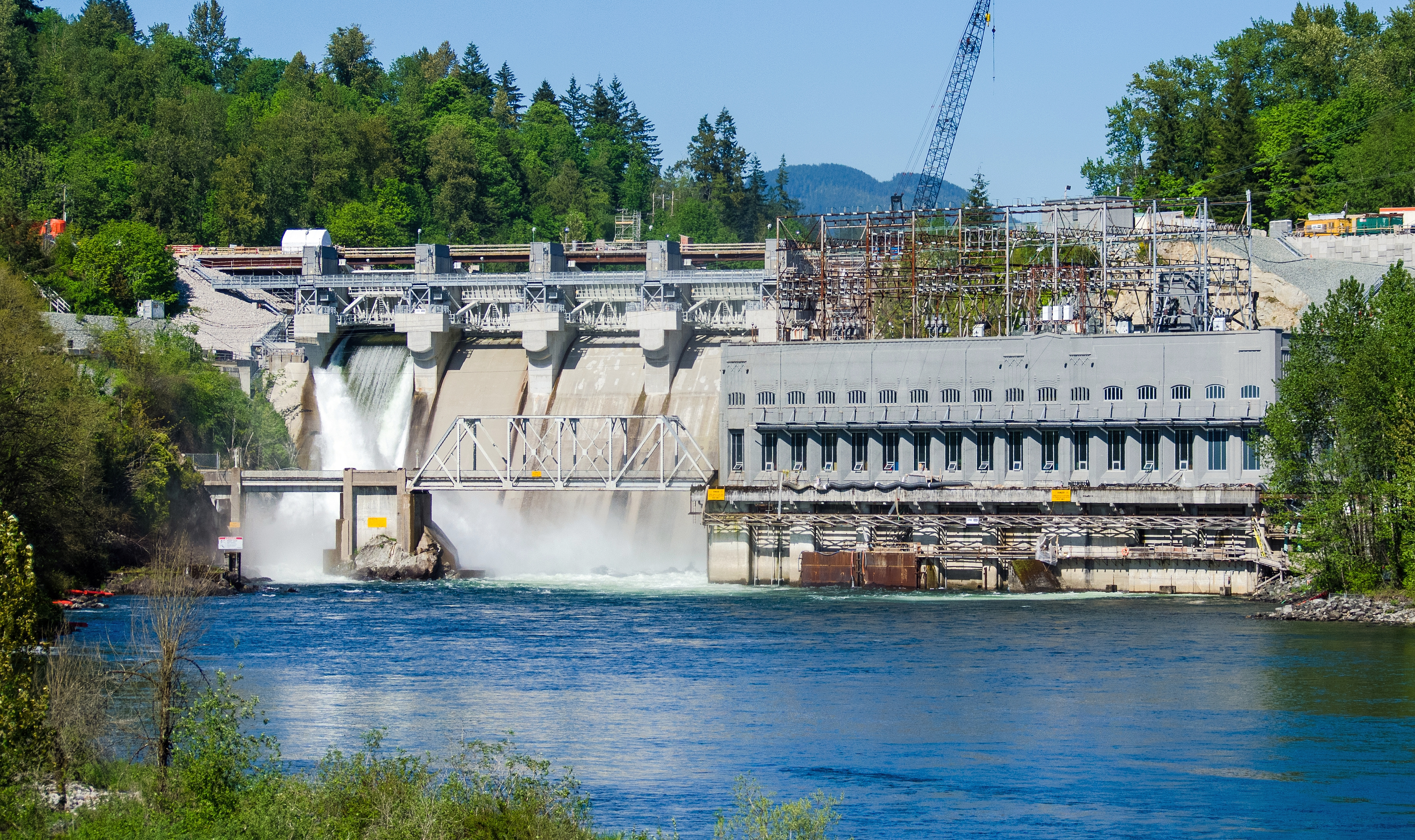
- Ruskin Dam and Powerhouse

- Location of the dam in British Columbia, Canada
- Country: Canada
- Location: Ruskin, British Columbia
- Coordinates: 49°11′45″N 122°24′27″W
- Status: Operational
- Construction began: 1929
- Opening date: 1930
- Owner: BC Hydro

Dam and spillways
- Impounds: Stave River
- Height: 59.4 m (195 ft)
- Length: 110 m (361 ft)
- Elevation at crest: 45.7 m (150 ft)
- Spillway type: Gated ogee crest
- Spillway capacity: 4,430 m^{3}/s (156,444 cu ft/s)

Reservoir
- Creates: Hayward Lake
- Total capacity: 42,000,000 m^{3} (34,050 acre⋅ft)
- Catchment area: 953 km^{2} (368 sq mi)
- Surface area: 3 km^{2} (741 acres)
- Maximum length: 5.6 km (3 mi)
- Normal elevation: 41.1 m (135 ft)

Power Station
- Operator: BC Hydro
- Turbines: 3 x 35 MW Francis-type
- Installed capacity: 105 MW
- Annual generation: 374 GWh

Ruskin Dam is a concrete gravity dam on the Stave River in Ruskin, British Columbia, Canada. The dam was completed in 1930 for the primary purpose of hydroelectric power generation. The dam created Hayward Lake, which supplies water to a 105 MW powerhouse and flooded the Stave's former lower canyon, which ended in a small waterfall approximately where the dam is today.

== Background ==
Ruskin Dam was constructed along with the Western Canada Power Company's hydroelectric development of the Stave Valley. Stave Falls Dam was completed in 1912 and Alouette Dam, the third dam in the system, in 1928. Construction on Ruskin Dam, about 5.6 km (3 mi) downstream of Stave Falls began in 1929 by the British Columbia Electric Railway who had previously bought Western Canada Power in 1921. In November 1930, the dam was inaugurated and local businessmen and politicians celebrated by dining in its powerhouse. Only two generators were operational at first and the third was added in 1950. The first superintendent of Stave Falls Dam was the namesake for Hayward Lake. In 1961, when the provincial government took over the BC Electric Company, the dam became the property of BC Hydro, a Crown corporation.

=== Upgrade ===
Beginning in 2012 and continuing until 2018, the dam and its facilities are expected to undergo an C$800 million upgrade. The project includes replacing the generators, reinforcing the right bank of the dam, upgrading the intake and penstocks, replacing the spillway piers and gates and relocating the switchyard. The upgrades are aimed at bringing the dam and its facilities up to safety standards, improving their seismic performance and increasing their efficiency and life. Three new 38MW turbine-generators provide a slight capacity increase to 114MW.

== Design ==
Ruskin Dam is a 59.4 m (195 ft) tall and 110 m (361 ft) long concrete gravity type. The dam creates a reservoir (Hayward Lake) with a 42,000,000 m^{3} (34,050 acre⋅ft) capacity and 3 km^{2} (741 acres) surface area. The dam sits at the outlet of a 953 km^{2} (368 sq mi) catchment area and the reservoir extends 5.6 km (3 mi). The dam's spillway is an ogee-type and consists of seven radial gates. It has a 4,430 m^{3}/s (156,444 cu ft/s) maximum discharge capacity. The dam's powerhouse is immediately adjacent on the river's eastern bank. It contains three 35 MW Francis turbine-generators and water is fed to each by a single penstock. Access to the powerhouse is by a truss bridge from the company offices on the west side of the river.

== Operation ==
Ruskin Dam is part of the Alouette-Stave Falls-Ruskin Hydroelectric Complex. Upstream of the dam is the Stave Falls Dam and Powerhouse which has an installed capacity of 90 MW. Supplementing Stave Lake is small amount of water from Alouette Lake which is created by the Alouette Dam in northern Maple Ridge via 1,067 m (3,501 ft) long tunnel connecting intakes at the northern end of Alouette Lake and Stave Lake. At the end of the tunnel is a penstock which feeds the 8 MW Alouette Powerhouse on the western shore of Stave Lake approximately 8 km north of Stave Dam. Water released from Stave Falls Dam flows into Hayward Lake and is used by the Ruskin Dam for power generation.

== In popular culture ==
The dam has been a filming location for the TV series The X-Files, MacGyver, Smallville, Dark Angel, the Lifetime made-for-tv movie The Boy Next Door, starring Dina Meyer, and finally the movie The Invisible. In Smallville episodes "Prototype", "Phantom" and "Bizarro", it is referred to as "Reeves Dam", a homage to the late Superman actors George Reeves and Christopher Reeve.

== See also ==
- List of electrical generating stations in British Columbia
