= Stave Falls Dam and Powerhouse =

Stave Falls Dam
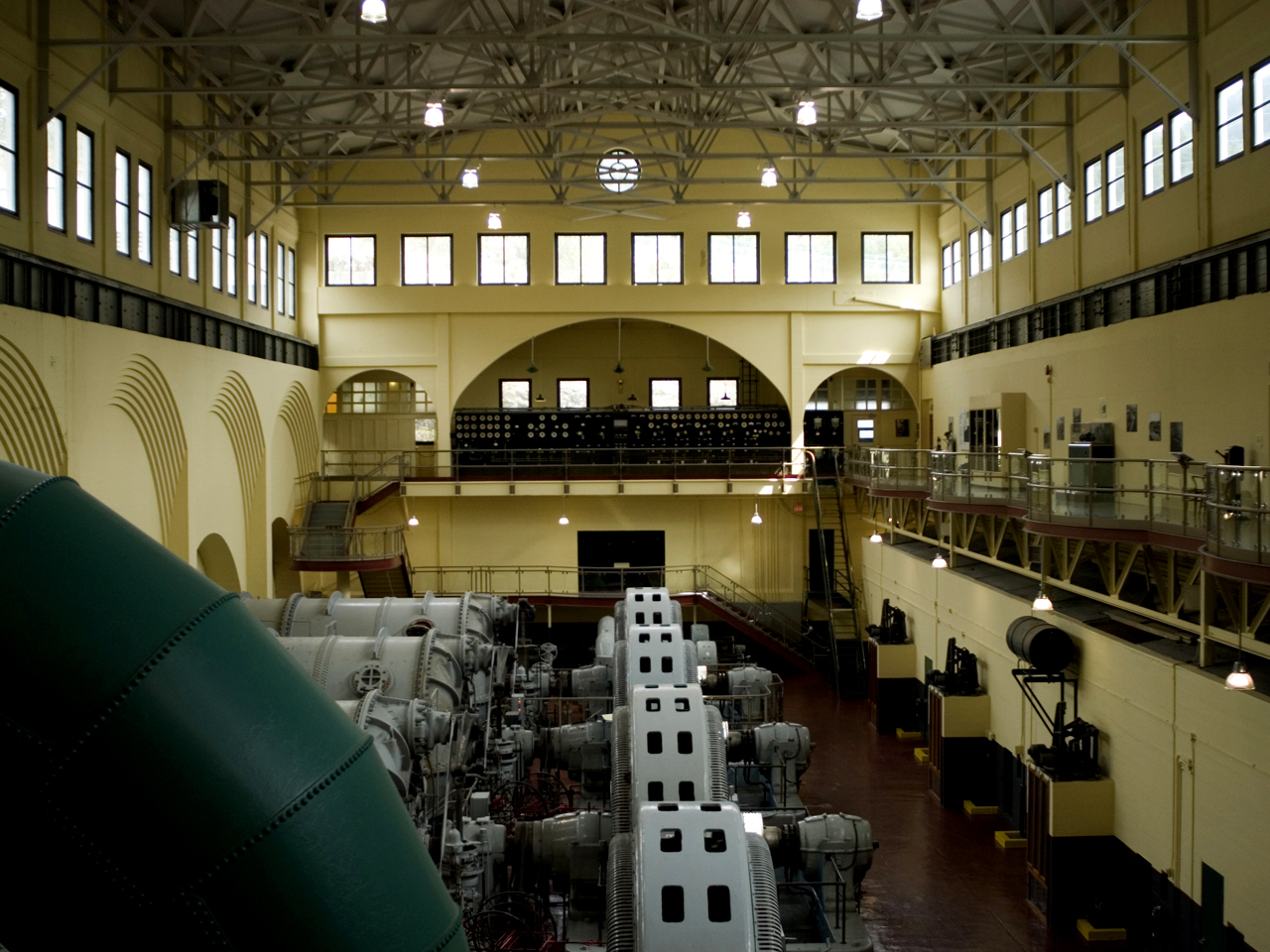
- Interior of the original Stave Falls power house

- Location of dam in British Columbia, Canada
- Country: Canada
- Location: Stave Falls
- Coordinates: 49°13′47″N 122°21′20″W
- Status: Operational
- Construction began: 1909
- Opening date: 1912
- Owner: BC Hydro

Dam and spillways
- Impounds: Stave River
- Length: 122 m (400 ft); Blind Slough Dam: 190 m (623 ft)
- Elevation at crest: 83.75 m (275 ft)
- Width (crest): 5 m (16 ft); Blind Slough Dam: 8.5 m (28 ft)
- Spillways: 2
- Spillway type: Sluice/Tainter gate controlled
- Spillway capacity: 3,500 m^{3}/s (123,601 cu ft/s)

Reservoir
- Creates: Stave Lake
- Total capacity: 470,000,000 m^{3} (381,035 acre⋅ft)
- Catchment area: 1,170 km^{2} (452 sq mi)
- Surface area: 62 km^{2} (24 sq mi)
- Normal elevation: 82 m (269 ft)

Power Station
- Operator: BC Hydro
- Commission date: Original: 1911; New: 2000
- Turbines: 2 x 45 MW Kaplan turbines
- Installed capacity: 90 MW
- Annual generation: 362 GWh

National Historic Site of Canada
- Official name: Stave Falls Hydro-Electric Installation National Historic Site of Canada
- Designated: 2003

Stave Falls Dam is a dual-dam power complex on the Stave River in Stave Falls, British Columbia, Canada. The dam was completed in 1912 for the primary purpose of hydroelectric power production. To increase the capacity of Stave Lake, the dam was raised in 1925 and the Blind Slough Dam constructed in an adjacent watercourse 500 m (1,600 ft) to the north, which was the site of the eponymous Stave Falls. In 2000, the dam's powerhouse was replaced after a four-year upgrade. The original Stave Falls powerhouse was once British Columbia's largest hydroelectric power source, and is a National Historic Site of Canada.

== Background ==
The Stave Falls Dam was first visualized in the 1890s as hydroelectric development was becoming widespread. Exploiting the 24 m (79 ft) drop of Stave Falls could produce hydroelectricity which could be sold to various customers. In 1895, Stave Lake Electric and Power Co. Ltd was given permission to study the falls for electricity production. In 1909, the Western Canada Power Company bought Stave Lake Electric and Power and began construction of the dam. The first generator went online in December 1911 and the second in January 1912. Generators three and fourth went online in 1916 and 1922, respectively. In 1921, British Columbia Electric Railway bought Western Canada Power and continued to develop the power plant. A fifth generator was installed after it was realized that additional water from a dam raise and a reservoir created by the Alouette Dam (in the Alouette River drainage just west) could increase power production. The Stave Falls Dam was raised in 1925 and the fifth generator was operational on 19 September 1925. In 1926, the Blind Slough Dam was completed to supplement the reservoir's new size and serve as a spillway. Alouette Dam was completed in 1928.

Beginning in 1995, the original power station underwent decommissioning and was replaced with a new powerhouse containing two Kaplan turbines. The project included the construction of a new power plant intake, power house, tailrace channel and penstocks. It was completed in January 2000 and increased the installed capacity of the power plant from 52.5 MW to 90 MW.

The old powerhouse currently serves as a tourist attraction known as the Stave Falls Visitor Centre. It features exhibits about the construction of the dam, hydroelectric generation, renewable and non-renewable resources, hydroelectric generation, human and natural heritage, and conservation.

== Design ==
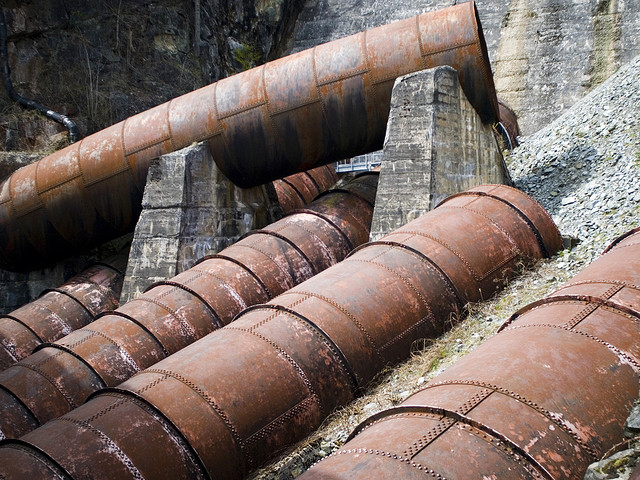
The original power station's penstocks

The Stave Falls Dam is a 122 m (400 ft) long concrete-gravity and rock-fill dam with a crest width of 5 m (16 ft). The Blind Slough Dam, 400 m (1,312 ft) to the north, is a 190 m (623 ft) long concrete-gravity dam with an 8.5 m (28 ft) wide crest. The Blind Slough Dam serves as a spillway which consists of 10 tainter gates and four sluice gates. It has a maximum discharge of 3,500 m^{3}/s (123,601 cu ft/s).

The dam's current powerhouse contains two 45 MW Kaplan turbines and generators for an installed capacity of 90 MW. Unit one receives water from a 183 m (600 ft) long tunnel while that of unit two is 202 m (663 ft) long. The old decommissioned powerhouse at the base of the Stave Falls Dam contains five horizontal double-Francis turbine-generators. Included are three exciters, two of which were once driven by smaller Francis turbines. Generators one through four used two exciters while generator five used its own. The penstocks for generators one through four had a 4.2 m (14 ft) diameter and were 45 m (148 ft) in length.

== Operation ==
The Stave Falls Dam is part of the Alouette-Stave Falls-Ruskin Hydroelectric Complex. Supplementing Stave Lake is water from Alouette Lake which was created by the Alouette Dam, 11.5 km (7 mi) northwest of Stave Falls Dam. A 1,067 m (3,501 ft) long tunnel connects Alouette Lake and Stave Lake. At the end of the tunnel is a penstock which feeds the 8 MW Alouette Powerhouse on the edge of Stave Lake. Water released from the lake flows into Hayward Lake and is used by the powerhouse adjacent to Ruskin Dam 5.6 km (3 mi) downstream for power generation.

== See also ==
- BCER Stave Falls Branch
- List of electrical generating stations in British Columbia
