= Salloomt Peak =

Mountain in the Coast Mountains, British Columbia, Canada

Coordinates: 52°26′27″N 126°27′36″W

Salloomt Peak is a 1,873 metres (6,145 ft) high mountain in the Kitimat Ranges of the Coast Mountains in the Bella Coola Valley region of British Columbia, Canada. It is located on the north side of the Bella Coola River between the communities of Firvale and Hagensborg.

== See also ==
- Salloomt River
- List of place names in Canada of aboriginal origin
