= Nusatsum Mountain =

Mountain in British Columbia, Canada

Nusq’lst mountain
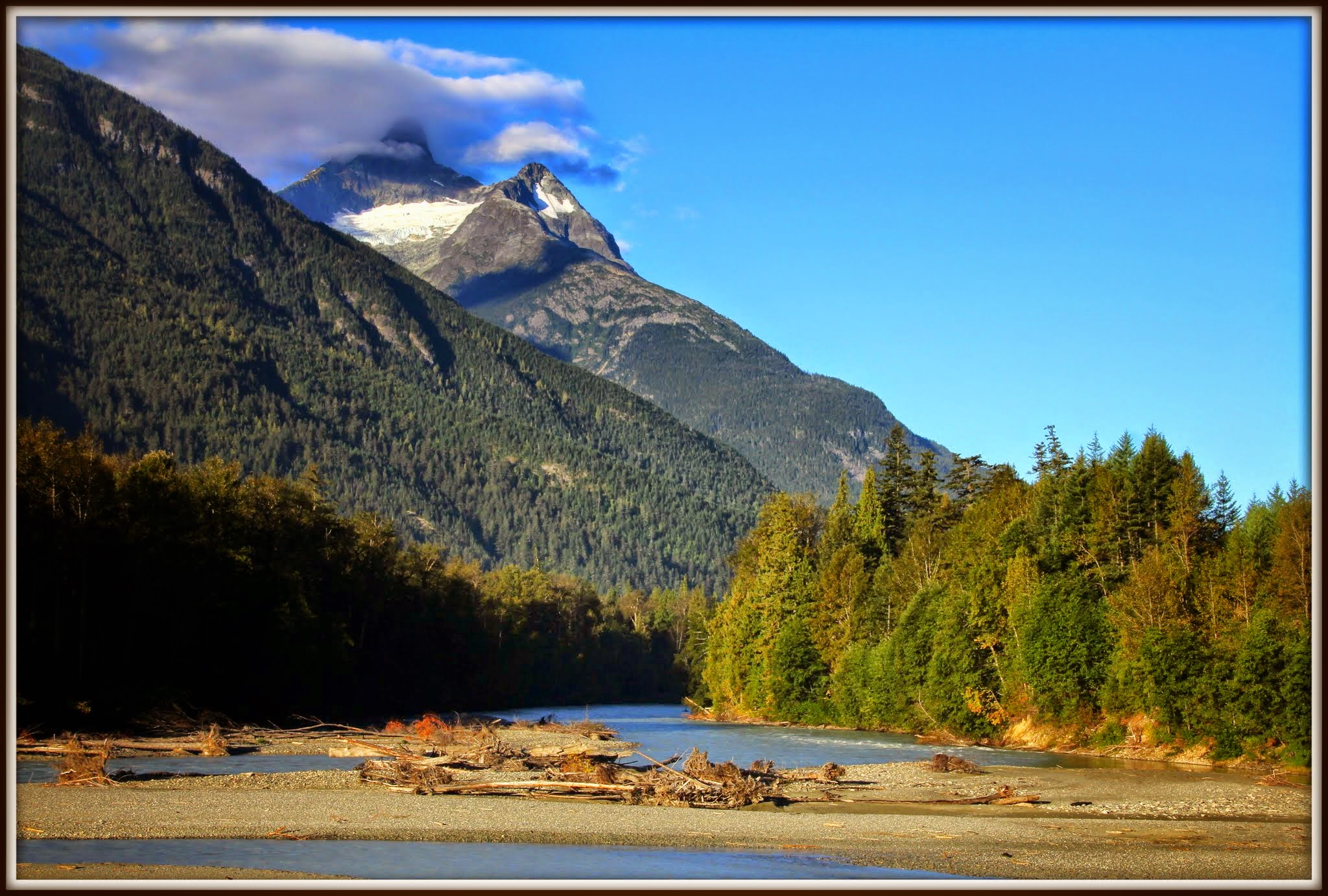
- East aspect

Highest point
- Elevation: 2,575 m (8,448 ft)
- Prominence: 1,058 m (3,471 ft)
- Parent peak: The Horn (2,907 m)
- Isolation: 5.47 km (3.40 mi)
- Coordinates: 52°23′50″N 126°22′42″W

Geography
- Location within British Columbia Location within Canada
- Interactive map of Nusatsum Mountain
- Country: Canada
- Province: British Columbia
- District: Range 3 Coast Land District
- Parent range: Coast Mountains
- Topo map: NTS 93D8 Stuie

Nusq’lst Mountain (2,575 m/8,448 feet) is a mountain in the Pacific Ranges of the Coast Mountains of British Columbia, Canada, located near the Nusatsum River and south of and between the communities of Firvale and Hagensborg. The peak can be seen from Highway 20. The mountain is the equivalent of Mount Ararat in the traditions of the Nuxalk, as the place where survivors found refuge from the Great Flood. The landform's toponym was officially adopted on March 13, 1947, by the Geographical Names Board of Canada. Other spellings of Nusatsum seen on older maps include "Nootsatsum", "Noosatum" and "Nutsatsum".

== Climate ==
Based on the Köppen climate classification, Nusatsum Mountain is located in the marine west coast climate zone of western North America. Most weather fronts originate in the Pacific Ocean, and travel east toward the Coast Mountains where they are forced upward by the range (orographic lift), causing them to drop their moisture in the form of rain or snowfall. As a result, the Coast Mountains experience high precipitation, especially during the winter months in the form of snowfall. Winter temperatures can drop below −20 °C with wind chill factors below −30 °C. This climate supports small glaciers on the mountain's slopes.

== Gallery ==
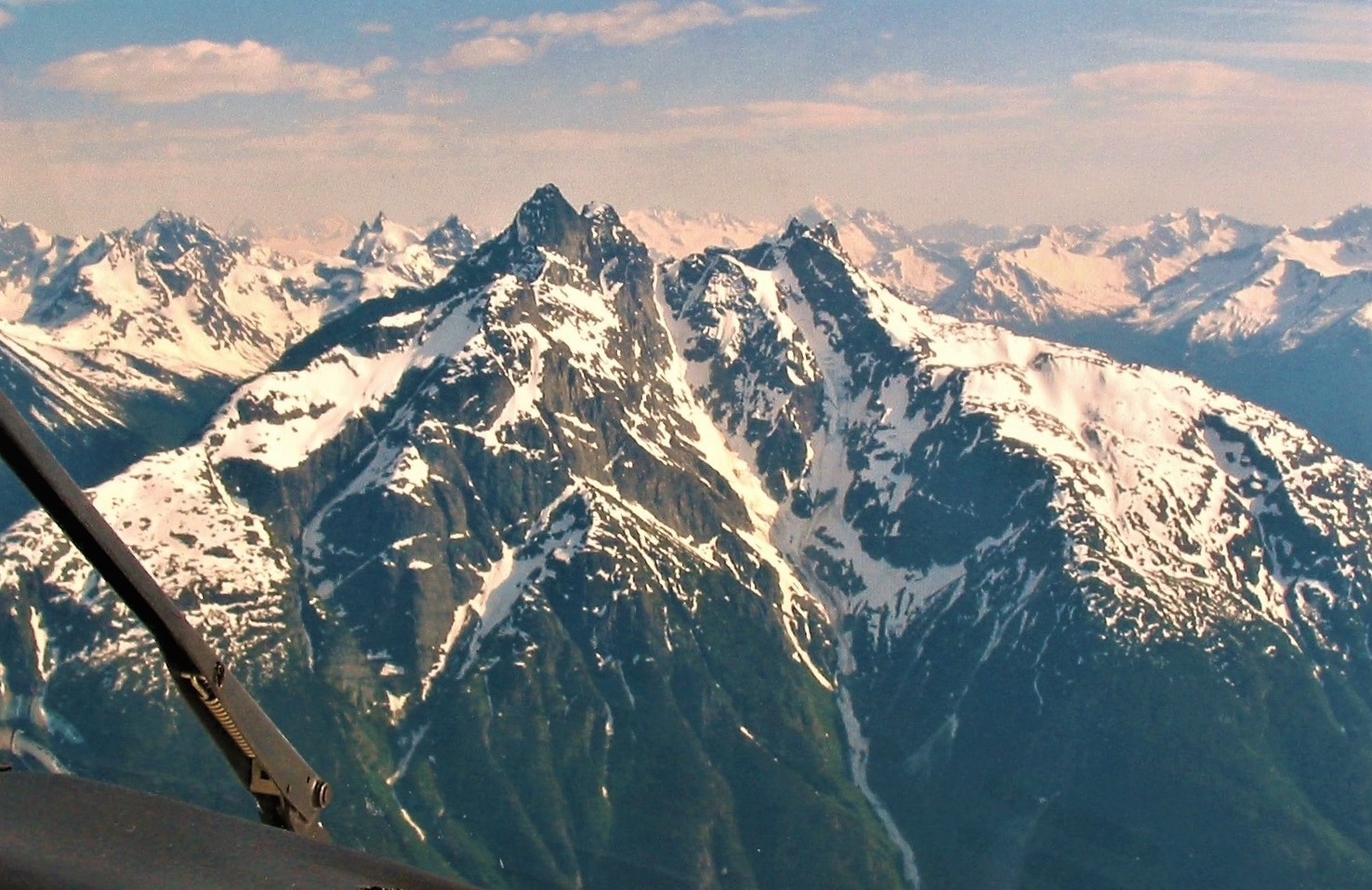
North aspect of Nusatsum Mountain seen on approach to Bella Coola Airfield

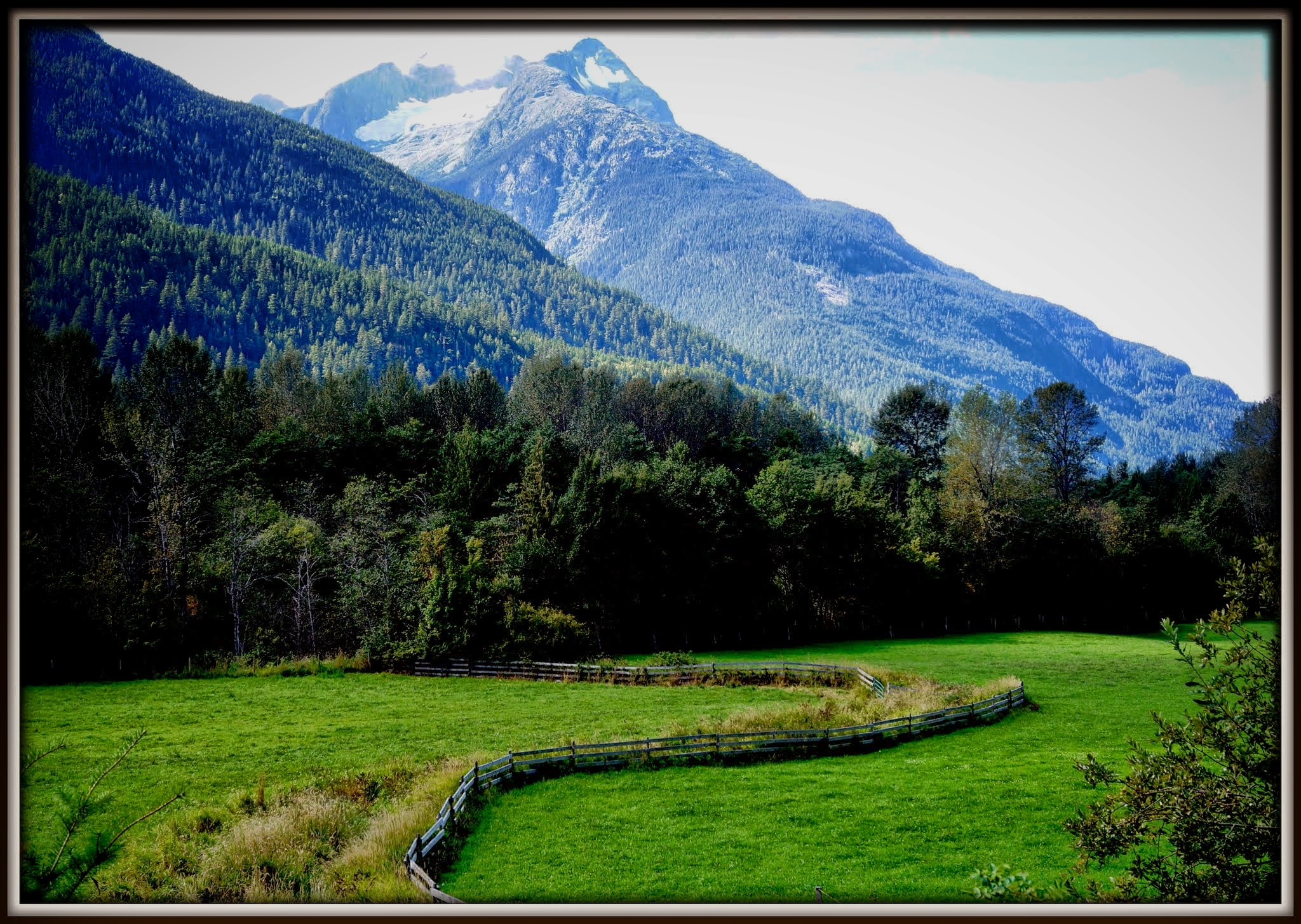
East aspect, from Bella Coola Valley

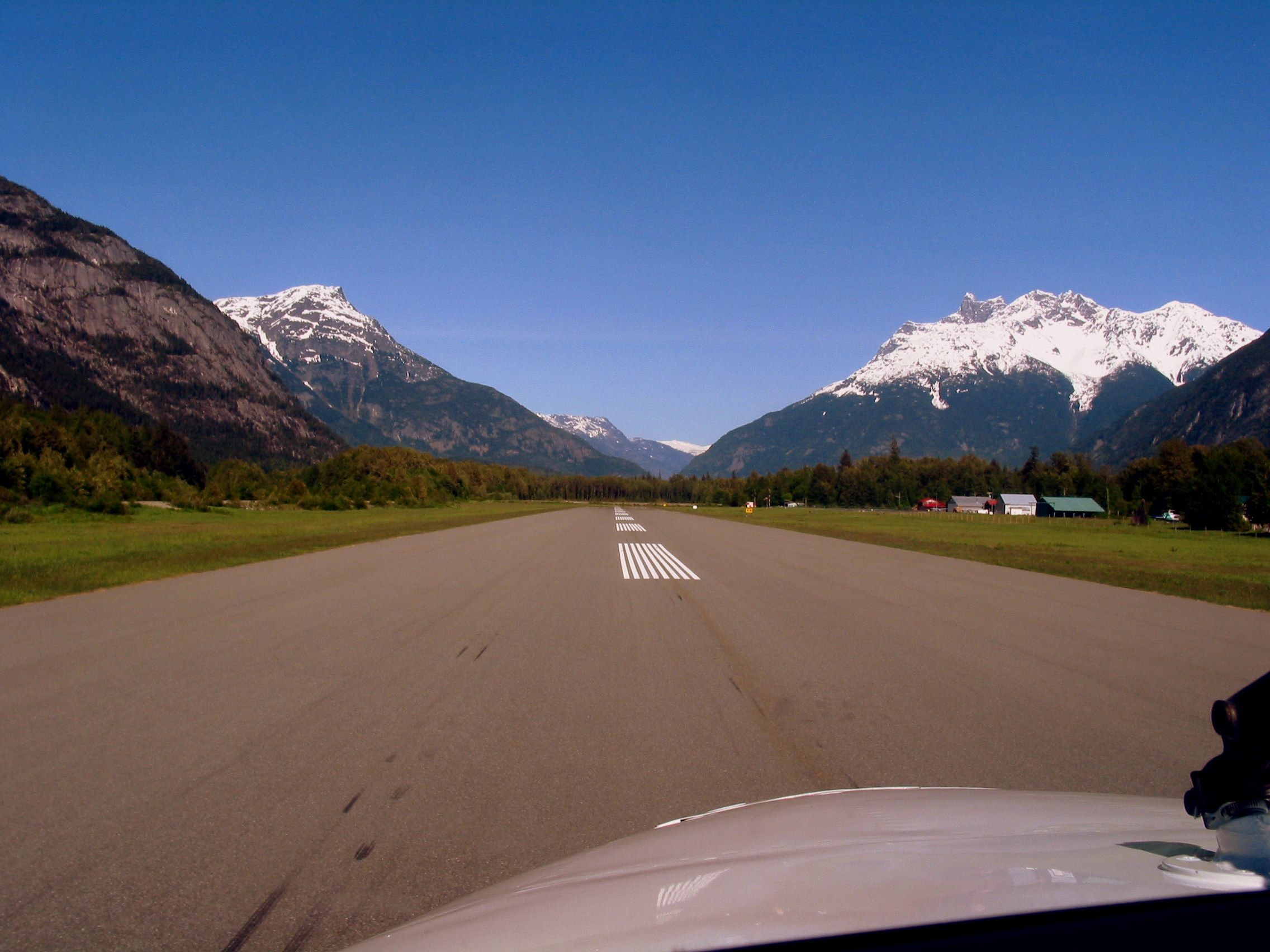
Nusatsum Mountain (right), west aspect from Bella Coola Airfield

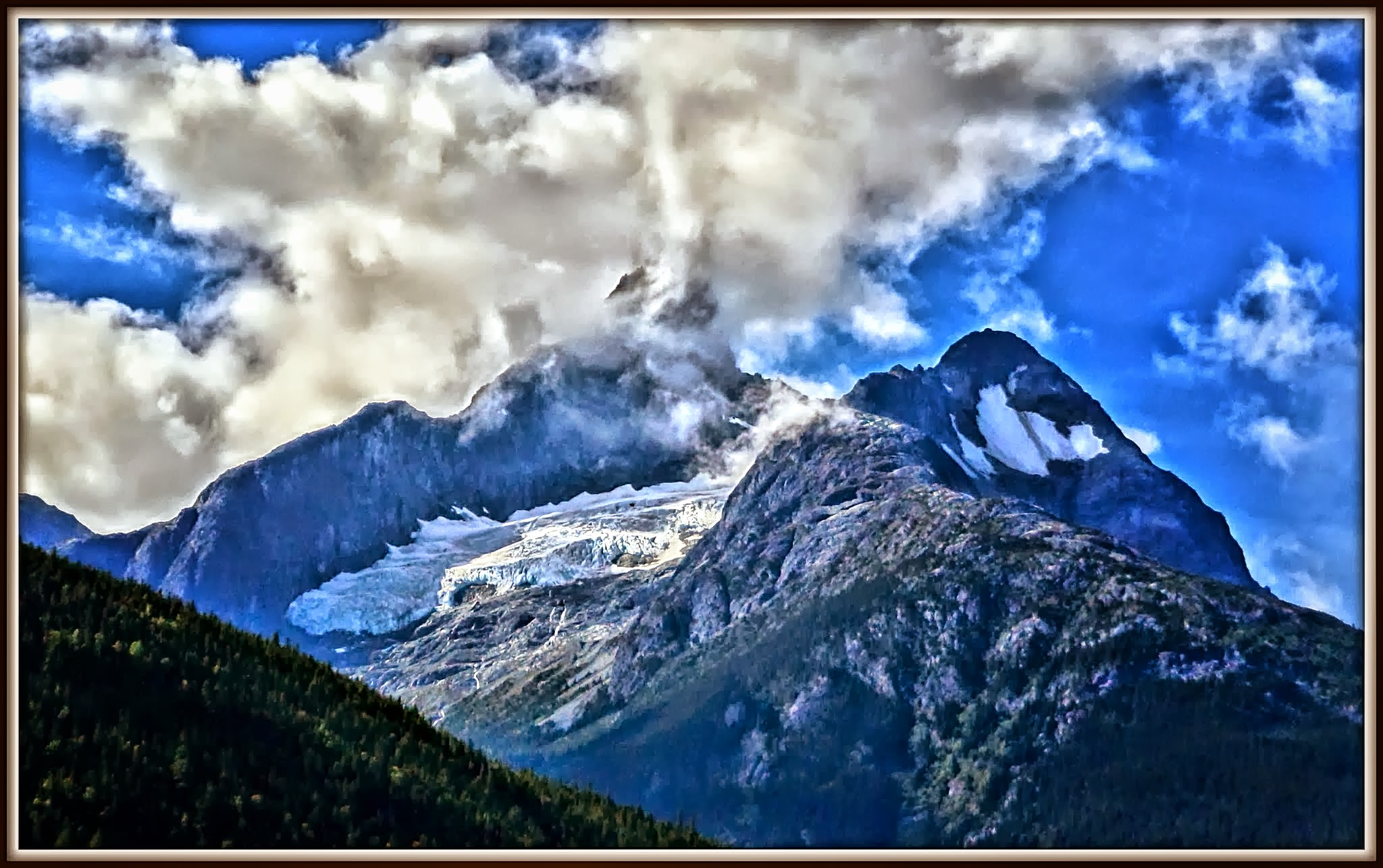
Nusatsum Mountain

== See also ==
- Geography of British Columbia
- List of place names in Canada of aboriginal origin
