= List of school districts in British Columbia =

The province of British Columbia in Canada is divided into 60 school districts which administer publicly funded education until the end of grade 12 in local areas or, in the case of francophone education, across the province.

== Districts ==
School district	Main office	Region	Communities served
School District 5 Southeast Kootenay	Cranbrook	Kootenays	Cranbrook, Fernie, Sparwood
School District 6 Rocky Mountain	Invermere	Kootenays	Kimberley, Invermere, Golden
School District 8 Kootenay Lake	Nelson	Kootenays	Nelson, Creston, Salmo, Kaslo
School District 10 Arrow Lakes	Nakusp	Kootenays	Nakusp, Burton, Edgewood, New Denver
School District 19 Revelstoke	Revelstoke	Okanagan/Mainline	Revelstoke
School District 20 Kootenay-Columbia	Trail	Kootenays	Castlegar, Rossland, Trail
School District 22 Vernon	Vernon	Okanagan/Mainline	Vernon, Lumby
School District 23 Central Okanagan	Kelowna	Okanagan/Mainline	Kelowna, Rutland, West Kelowna, Peachland Lake Country
School District 27 Cariboo-Chilcotin	Williams Lake	Northeast	Williams Lake, 100 Mile House, Canim Lake, Lac La Hache
School District 28 Quesnel	Quesnel	Northeast	Quesnel, Wells
School District 33 Chilliwack	Chilliwack	Fraser Valley	Chilliwack
School District 34 Abbotsford	Abbotsford	Fraser Valley	Abbotsford
School District 35 Langley	Langley	Metro/Coast	Township of Langley, Langley City, Aldergrove, Fort Langley
School District 36 Surrey	Surrey	Metro/Coast	Surrey, White Rock, Barnston Island
School District 37 Delta	Delta	Metro/Coast	Delta, Ladner, Tsawwassen
School District 38 Richmond	Richmond	Metro/Coast	Richmond
School District 39 Vancouver	Vancouver	Metro/Coast	Vancouver, UBC, University Endowment Lands
School District 40 New Westminster	New Westminster	Metro/Coast	New Westminster, Queensborough
School District 41 Burnaby	Burnaby	Metro/Coast	Burnaby
School District 42 Maple Ridge-Pitt Meadows	Maple Ridge	Metro/Coast	Maple Ridge, Pitt Meadows
School District 43 Coquitlam	Coquitlam	Metro/Coast	Anmore, Belcarra, Coquitlam, Port Coquitlam, Port Moody
School District 44 North Vancouver	North Vancouver	Metro/Coast	District of North Vancouver, City of North Vancouver
School District 45 West Vancouver	West Vancouver	Metro/Coast	Bowen Island, Lions Bay, West Vancouver
School District 46 Sunshine Coast	Gibsons	Metro/Coast	Gibsons, Sechelt
School District 47 Powell River	Powell River	Metro/Coast	Powell River
School District 48 Sea to Sky	Squamish	Metro/Coast	Whistler, Squamish, Pemberton
School District 49 Central Coast	Hagensborg	Northeast	Hagensborg, Bella Coola, Denny Island, Oweekeno
School District 50 Haida Gwaii	Daajing Giids	Northwest	Daajing Giids, Masset
School District 51 Boundary	Grand Forks	Kootenays	Grand Forks, Midway, Greenwood
School District 52 Prince Rupert	Prince Rupert	Northwest	Prince Rupert
School District 53 Okanagan Similkameen	Oliver	Okanagan/Mainline	Oliver, Osoyoos, Okanagan Falls, Keremeos
School District 54 Bulkley Valley	Smithers	Northwest	Smithers, Telkwa, Houston
School District 57 Prince George	Prince George	Northeast	Prince George, McBride, Mackenzie, Valemount
School District 58 Nicola-Similkameen	Merritt	Okanagan/Mainline	Merritt, Princeton
School District 59 Peace River South	Dawson Creek	Northeast	Dawson Creek, Chetwynd, Tumbler Ridge
School District 60 Peace River North	Fort St. John	Northeast	Fort St. John, Hudson's Hope, Prespatou
School District 61 Greater Victoria	Victoria	Greater Victoria	Esquimalt, Oak Bay, Saanich, Victoria, View Royal
School District 62 Sooke	Langford	Greater Victoria	Colwood, Langford, Metchosin, Port Renfrew, Sooke
School District 63 Saanich	Saanichton	Greater Victoria	Saanich, Central Saanich, North Saanich, Sidney
School District 64 Gulf Islands	Salt Spring Island	Vancouver Island	Salt Spring Island, Galiano, Mayne, Saturna, Pender Islands
School District 67 Okanagan Skaha	Penticton	Okanagan/Mainline	Penticton, Summerland
School District 68 Nanaimo-Ladysmith	Nanaimo	Vancouver Island	Lantzville, Nanaimo, Cedar, Ladysmith
School District 69 Qualicum	Parksville	Vancouver Island	Parksville, Qualicum Beach
School District 70 Pacific Rim	Port Alberni	Vancouver Island	Bamfield, Port Alberni, Tofino, Ucluelet
School District 71 Comox Valley	Courtenay	Vancouver Island	Comox, Courtenay, Cumberland
School District 72 Campbell River	Campbell River	Vancouver Island	Campbell River
School District 73 Kamloops/Thompson	Kamloops	Thompson Country	Kamloops, Chase, Barriere, Clearwater, Logan Lake
School District 74 Gold Trail	Ashcroft	Thompson Country	Ashcroft, Cache Creek, Clinton, Lytton, Lillooet
School District 75 Mission	Mission	Fraser Valley	Mission, Deroche, Dewdney,
School District 78 Fraser-Cascade	Hope	Fraser Valley	Hope, Agassiz, Yale, Boston Bar
School District 79 Cowichan Valley	Duncan	Vancouver Island	Duncan, Lake Cowichan, Crofton, Chemainus
School District 81 Fort Nelson	Fort Nelson	Northeast	Fort Nelson
School District 82 Coast Mountains	Terrace	Northwest	Terrace, Kitimat, Stewart
School District 83 Kwsaltktnéws ne Secwepemcúl'ecw	Salmon Arm	Okanagan/Mainline	Salmon Arm, Enderby, Armstrong, Sicamous, Malakwa
School District 84 Vancouver Island West	Gold River	Vancouver Island	Gold River, Zeballos
School District 85 Vancouver Island North	Port Hardy	Vancouver Island	Port Hardy, Port McNeill
School District 87 Stikine	Dease Lake	Northwest	Dease Lake, Atlin, Lower Post, Telegraph Creek
School District 91 Nechako Lakes	Vanderhoof	Northeast	Vanderhoof, Fort St. James, Burns Lake
School District 92 Nisga'a	New Aiyansh	Northwest	Gitlakdamix, Gitwinksihlkw, Laxgalts'ap, Gingolx
School District 93 Conseil scolaire francophone	Richmond	All	All of British Columbia

== Changes ==
Many school districts were in existence prior to British Columbia joining Canada in 1871. Some districts were just single schools or even one teacher. Traditionally school districts in British Columbia were either municipal, which were named after the municipality such as Vancouver or Victoria, or rural and given a regional name. Many districts' names are a legacy of this pattern. In 1946, the Ministry of Education rearranged the province's 650 school districts into 74, giving each a number and a name. The school districts were numbered geographically starting in the southeast corner and proceeding in a counter-clockwise pattern. This has been disrupted by successive changes to districts. The most recent changes occurred in April 1996 with the restructuring and reduction in the number of school districts from 74 to 57.

District changes 1996
Old school district	New school district
1 Fernie, 2 Cranbrook	5 Southeast Kootenay
3 Kimberley, 4 Windermere, 18 Golden	6 Rocky Mountain
7 Nelson, 86 Creston-Kaslo	8 Kootenay Lake
9 Castlegar, 11 Trail	20 Kootenay-Columbia
12 Grand Forks, 13 Kettle Valley	51 Boundary
14 Southern Okanagan, 16 Keremeos	53 Okanagan Similkameen
17 Princeton, 31 Merritt	58 Nicola-Similkameen
15 Penticton, 77 Summerland	67 Okanagan Skaha
24 Kamloops, 26 North Thompson	73 Kamloops/Thompson
29 Lillooet, 30 South Cariboo	74 Gold Trail
32 Hope, 76 Agassiz-Harrison	78 Fraser-Cascade
65 Cowichan, 66 Lake Cowichan	79 Cowichan Valley
80 Kitimat, 88 Terrace	82 Coast Mountains
21 Armstrong-Spallumcheen, 89 Shuswap	83 North Okanagan-Shuswap
55 Burns Lake, 56 Nechako	91 Nechako Lakes

== See also ==
- Conseil scolaire francophone de la Colombie-Britannique, the province-wide francophone K-12 school system
