= Nusatsum River =

Coordinates: 52°24′39″N 126°29′19″W

The Nusatsum River is a river in the Bella Coola Valley of the Central Coast region of British Columbia, Canada. It is a tributary of the Bella Coola River, flowing northwest to meet that river just upstream of the community of Hagensborg.

"Nusatsum" has been spelled variously as Nootsatsum, Noosatum, and Nutsatsum.

== See also ==
- Nusatsum Mountain
- List of rivers of British Columbia
