= School District 74 =

School District 74 may refer to:

- Lincolnwood School District 74 - Lincolnwood, Illinois, United States (Chicago area)
- School District 74 Gold Trail - British Columbia, Canada
