= Gidgalang Kuuyas Naay Secondary School =

Public high school in Daajing Giids, British Columbia, Canada

GidG̱alang Ḵuuyas Naay

Location
- PO Box 70; Daajing Giids, British Columbia, V0T 1S0; Canada
- Coordinates: 53.2553°N 132.0982°W

Information
- School type: Government-funded, high school
- School board: School District 50 Haida Gwaii/Queen Charlotte
- School number: 5050012
- Principal: Deavlan Bradley
- Staff: 13
- Grades: 8–12
- Enrollment: 128 (2020–21)
- Website: sd50.bc.ca/schools/gidgalang-kuuyas-naay-secondary-school/

GidG̱alang Ḵuuyas Naay (formerly Queen Charlotte Secondary) is a government-funded high school in Daajing Giids, British Columbia. It is one of two secondary schools in School District 50 Haida Gwaii. It has a student body of around 100 to 150 students.

== See also ==
- Haida Gwaii
