= School District 50 Haida Gwaii =

School district in British Columbia, Canada

- Logo of School District 50 Haida Gwaii

Location
- Village of Daajing Giids Sandspit, Masset, Daajing Giids, Port Clements, Skidegate in Northwest Canada

District information
- Superintendent: Manu Madhok
- Schools: 6
- Budget: CA$10 million

Students and staff
- Students: 463 (2020–21)

Other information
- Website: sd50.bc.ca

School District 50 Haida Gwaii is a school district in British Columbia, Canada. It covers Haida Gwaii (formerly the Queen Charlotte Islands) off the north coast of British Columbia immediately west of Prince Rupert. Centered in Daajing Giids (formerly known as Queen Charlotte City), it includes the communities of Sandspit, Masset, Skidegate, and Port Clements.

== Schools ==
| School | Location | Grades |
|---|---|---|
| Agnes L Mathers Elementary School | Sandspit | K–7 |
| Continuing Education School District 50 | Sandspit | 12 |
| Gudangaay Tlaats'gaa Naay Secondary School | Masset | 8–12 |
| Port Clements Elementary School | Port Clements | K–7 |
| Gidgalang Kuuyas Naay Secondary School | Daajing Giids | 8–12 |
| Sk'aadgaa Naay Elementary School | Skidegate | K–7 |
| Tahayghen Elementary School | Masset | K–7 |

== See also ==
- List of school districts in British Columbia
