= University of the Fraser Valley =

Public university in British Columbia, Canada

- Motto: Iyaqáwtxw
- Motto in English: Halkomelem: "house of transformation"
- Type: Public university
- Established: 1974; 52 years ago
- Affiliations: U Sports, AUCC, CWUAA, CBIE, CUP, CASA, CICan, UnivCan
- Chancellor: Jo-Ann Archibald
- President: James Mandigo
- Faculty: 710 (c. 2012)
- Students: 6,926 (2024-25 FTE)
- Undergraduates: 9,200
- Postgraduates: 70
- Location: Abbotsford, Agassiz, Chilliwack, Hope & Mission, British Columbia, Canada
- Campus: Urban, 26 ha (64 acres) (Abbotsford)
- Colours: Green
- Nickname: UFV Cascades
- Mascot: Sasq 'ets
- Website: ufv.ca

The University of the Fraser Valley (UFV), formerly known as University College of the Fraser Valley and Fraser Valley College, is a public university with campuses in Abbotsford, Chilliwack, Mission and Hope, British Columbia, Canada. Founded in 1974 as Fraser Valley College, it was a response to the need for expanded vocational training in the communities of the Fraser Valley. In 1991, it became a university college, with degree-granting status. As the University College of the Fraser Valley, it grew rapidly, becoming one of the largest university colleges in Canada.

In recognition of the growing needs for higher education within the region and in the province, the provincial government granted full university status on 21 April 2008. Student enrolment is now over 15,000 students annually.

== History ==
=== Beginnings ===
In the 1960s, citizens of the Fraser Valley demanded a post-secondary educational facility within the Fraser Valley. In 1966, a proposal was rejected by the provincial government to found a junior college. Not to be swayed by this early defeat, supporters who wanted post-secondary representation lobbied to have a vocational school built. The proposed site for this vocational school was to be near the geographical centre of the Fraser Valley, on Lickman Road in Chilliwack. This proposal passed, and plans for the school were put into motion. However, with the election of a new provincial government in 1972, the school's development was put on hold. Communities again lobbied for continuation of this project, and so a special task force was appointed by the government to study the feasibility of a college in the Fraser Valley.

The task force recommended a comprehensive regional college, providing university transfer, career and vocational programs. A plebiscite was proposed to ask for taxpayer support on this endeavour, and passed with 89% in favour. In reaction to this strong show of support, the provincial government announced the establishment of Fraser Valley College on April 4, 1974.

Only a few months of planning went into the new college before it opened its doors in September 1974. Since no new facilities had yet been built, classes were held in church basements, public schools, commercially rented spaces, and the Coqualeetza Education Centre. Offices were set up in store fronts, community centres, and designated sections of public schools and school board offices. During its first year, Fraser Valley College enrolled 183 full-time and over 2,300 part-time students.

=== Expansion ===
With student and community support, the provincial government approved university college status for some institutions. Three community colleges were granted authority to offer baccalaureate degrees following a 1988 government initiative designed to increase access to degree programs in British Columbia. Three institutions–Malaspina, Cariboo and Okanagan–were renamed university colleges. Fraser Valley College received university college status on July 3rd, 1991 after an intense community campaign advocating for third- and fourth-year programming for the Fraser Valley.

In September 1991, the administrative Board officially changed its name to the University College of the Fraser Valley. Initially, the university colleges offered degrees under the aegis of one or more of four provincial universities (Simon Fraser University, the University of British Columbia, the University of Victoria) and the Open University. In 1994, the University College of the Fraser Valley established an undergraduate degree in adult education. In 1995, the university colleges were awarded the authority to grant degrees in their own right.

=== University status ===
On April 21, 2008, the Provincial Government announced its intention to amend the University Act at the Legislative Assembly of British Columbia to upgrade UCFV into a full university, called University of the Fraser Valley (UFV). The legislation renaming the University College to University received Royal Assent on May 29, 2008. The university officially began operation under the new name on September 1, 2008. In the 2010 The Globe and Mail Canadian University Report, UFV earned the most "A Range" grades of any post-secondary institution in British Columbia, receiving A grades in quality of education, student–faculty interaction, and ease of registration.

== Governance and academics ==
The administration of UFV, as mandated by the University Act, is composed of a chancellor, convocation, board, senate, and faculties of the university. The Board of Governors is responsible for the management of property and revenue, while the Senate is vested with managing the academic operation of the university. Both are composed of faculty and students who are elected to the position. Degrees and diplomas are conferred by the convocation, which is composed of alumni, administrators, and faculty, with a quorum of twenty members. UFV also has a president, who is a chief executive officer of the university and a member of the senate, board of governors, convocation, and also serves as vice chancellor. The president of the university is responsible for managing the academic operation of the university, including recommending appointments, calling meetings of faculties, and establishing committees.

The current President of UFV is Dr. James Mandigo.

=== Faculties and schools ===
UFV's academic activity is organized into "faculties", and "schools". Currently, the university has seven faculties and three schools. The College of Arts houses the two largest faculties (Humanities and Social Sciences) with sixteen departments, followed by the Faculty of Applied and Technical Studies, while the Faculty of Science has four departments, and the Faculty of Health Sciences has five programs.

=== Research ===
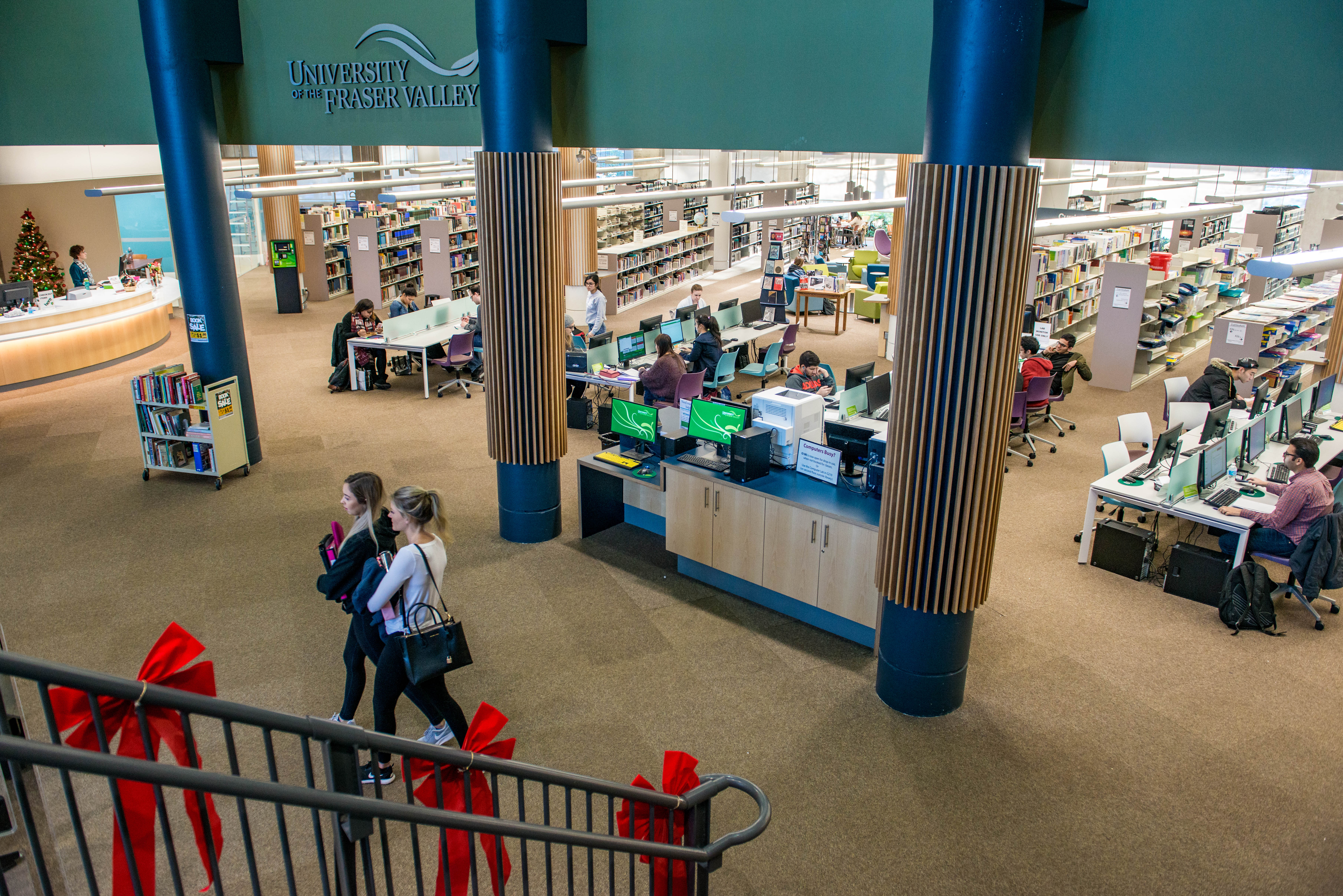
UFV Library

UFV is home to ten research centres and institutes; additionally, the Chilliwack Campus is the site of the new BC Centre of Excellence for Agriculture. Much of the research conducted at UFV, in particular through the activities of centres such as the Centre for Food and Farmland Innovation and the South Asian Studies Institute, focuses on issues of regional concern.

There are three Canada Research Chairs at UFV: Lenore Newman holds the Canada Research Chair in Food Security and the Environment; Keith Thor Carlson holds the Canada Research Chair in Indigenous and Community Engaged History; Cindy Jardine holds the Canada Research Chair in Health and Community. Additionally, Irwin Cohen holds an RCMP Senior Research Chair in Crime Reduction.

UFV is designated a Special Purpose, Teaching University under the University Act, with a mandate to focus on regional undergraduate education. However, faculty members are also actively engaged in research, and UFV places major emphasis on providing research opportunities for undergraduate students and training in research skills. Students have opportunities to apply for grants and lead research projects, to co-author papers with professors, and to present papers at international conferences. UFV also promotes and recognizes student research through its Undergraduate Research Excellence Award program.

=== Enrolment ===
In the 2024/2025 fiscal year, the UFV individual student count was 16,364, including the fall undergraduate count of 12,090 and nearly 3,000 international students. UFV's region has a large population that totaled 195,726 in 2021. Enrolment continues to grow. UFV exceeded the Ministry of Higher Education and Labour Market Development's funded target for 2024/2025 by 101.9%.

=== Funding ===
Operating funding for UFV has increased by $19.8 million, from $33.5 million in 2001/02 to $53.3 million in 2010/11 – a 59.1 per cent increase.

In March 2026, UFV dismissed approximately 45 faculty and staff amid a reported $20 million operating deficit. Several additional employees accepted voluntary departure packages. The financial pressures were mainly attributed to federal international student enrollment policies introduced in 2024, affecting revenue derived from international student tuition.

=== Programs ===
UFV offers master's degrees, bachelor's degrees, associate degrees, diplomas, certificates and citations across a wide range of programs in fine arts, humanities, science, social sciences, applied communication, business, nursing, as well as technical and trade programs.

=== Program transferability ===
UFV offers many transferable courses to other educational institutions, which often lead to direct transfers into second-year or third-year studies at other post secondary institutions. To aid in this, UFV is a part of the BC Transfer Guide Website, a resource for planning and understanding transfer in the BC post-secondary education system.

== Campuses ==
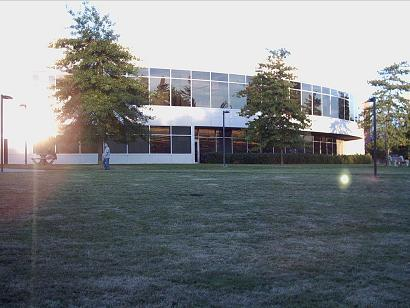
Abbotsford campus library

=== Abbotsford ===
The Abbotsford campus was UFV's first permanent campus, and opened its doors in 1983. A new building, containing the main institution library, First Heritage Computer Access Centre, and other instructional and support areas, was opened in the fall of 1996. In 1997, D Building, featuring classrooms, laboratories, and offices was opened. In 2002, the student activity centre and first gymnasium were opened. 2007 brought the opening of UFV's first student residence—Baker House, as well as an expanded gymnasium facility, with the ability to seat 1,500 people.

In 1978, trades programs started with a carpentry program. Initially, this program was run from Portage Avenue in Chilliwack. At the time, the land belonged to the Chilliwack School District, and the Ministry of Advanced Education funded the building of the carpentry shop. Originally, this shop was supposed to be handed over to the Chilliwack School District after 5 years, but it took nearly 12 years to secure the funding to build a replacement shop in Abbotsford. Other trades programs were based at the Abbotsford campus in Building C. In 1991, UCFV moved all trades programs to the Abbotsford campus. In 2007, UFV Trades and Technology programs moved into newly renovated facilities at the new Canada Education Park on the former Canadian Forces Base Chilliwack. Most programs and services based in Chilliwack moved to the new campus at CEP in 2012.

=== Chilliwack campus at Canada Education Park ===
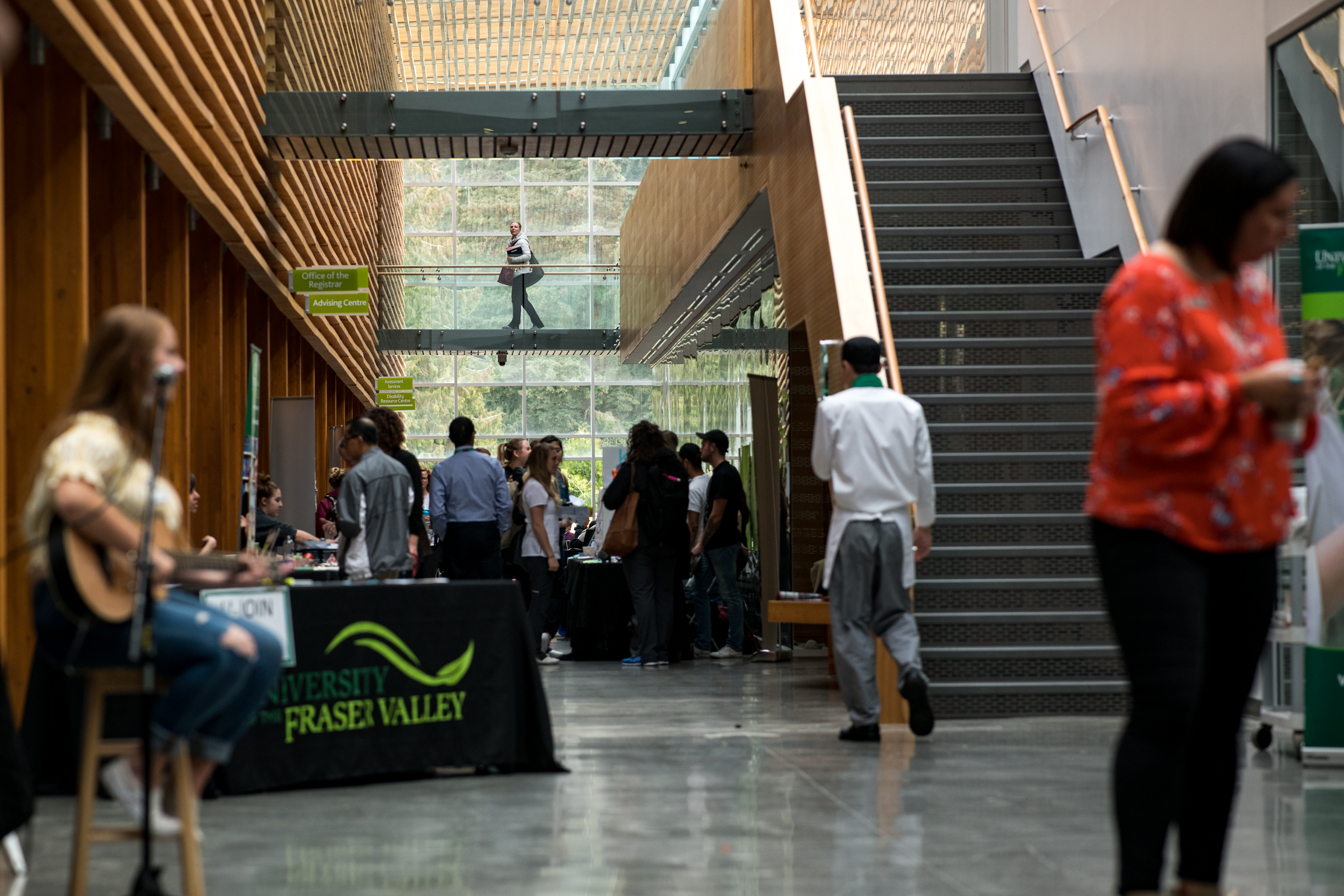
Chilliwack campus at Canada Education Park

The Chilliwack campus is located at Canada Education Park (CEP). It houses the Trades and Technology Centre, which opened in 2009, the Faculty of Health Sciences building and the Agriculture Centre of Excellence, which opened in May 2012 and spring 2014 respectively.

=== UFV Five Corners ===
In 2012, the university announced plans to open a satellite campus with a focus on programming related to business development and training in the Five Corners neighbourhood in Downtown Chilliwack. UFV Five Corners was located in a building donated to the university by Bank of Montreal. In 2018 it was shut down, and the building was leased out to the Chilliwack Economic Partners Corporation.

=== Hope ===
The Hope centre is a regional centre, run in partnership with the Fraser-Cascade school district.

=== Mission ===
In 1975, a temporary campus was established in Mission, offering continuing education and adult basic education programs. In 1996, UFV and the Mission School District partnered to open the Heritage Park Centre. This centre acts as a UFV campus, middle school, community theatre and fitness centre, all contained within a single facility.

=== Chandigarh, India ===
UFV India is located in Chandigarh, India within the Goswami Ganesh Dutta Sanatan Dharma College Chandigarh (SD College) campus in Sector 32-C. This international location was founded in 2006 to provide an alternative study option for Indian students looking to study in Canada.

Formal discussions began in 2003 between Panjab University and University College of the Fraser Valley (as it was then known) on educational collaborations. This resulted in a MoU in 2004, which included exploration of curriculum development and faculty and student exchange. It was also at this time that the idea of delivering UFV academic programs in India took shape, and in 2006, UFV and Goswami Ganesh Dutta Sanatan Dharma College (an affiliate of Punjab University) signed an agreement to deliver the Bachelor of Business Administration (BBA) program to Indian students at SD College.

Students who enrol in Canadian undergraduate programs UFV India choose from business, computer information systems, and liberal arts. After completing at least one full academic year, students have the option to apply for a campus transfer to the University of the Fraser Valley in Canada or other universities across Canada. Students transfer to Canada as a cohort or have the option to complete all four years of their Canadian undergraduate program at UFV India.

In addition to undergraduate programs, UFV India offers a pathway to a Master of Management (MoM) program at the University of Windsor. The Management Post-Baccalaureate Certificate Program is designed for Indian students with a three-year bachelor's degree who wish to pursue a master's degree in Canada. Students spend one-year at UFV India and then apply to the University of Windsor to complete their MoM.

The UFV India model allows students to stay close to home as they begin their international education. While in India, students are mentored by UFV India staff and faculty to develop skills relevant to succeeding in Canada.

== Student life ==
=== Athletics ===
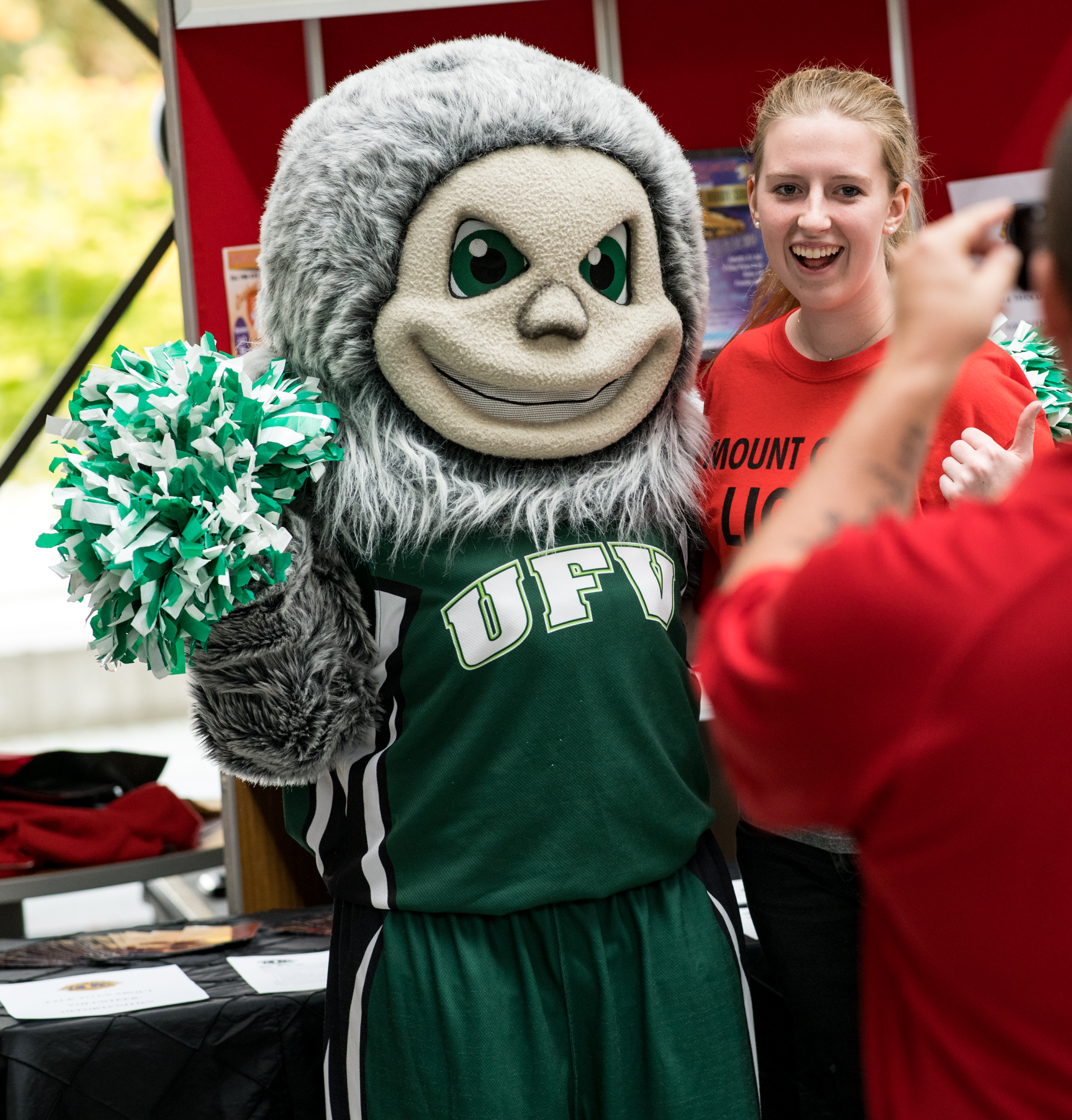
Sasq’ets, the Cascades’ Sasquatch mascot

UFV is represented in U Sports by the UFV Cascades. The Envision Athletic Centre houses two gymnasiums, a fitness centre and change rooms. UFV's current varsity sports are basketball (M/W), golf (M/W), soccer (M/W), and volleyball (M/W). It also has clubs for baseball (M), rowing (M/W), and rugby sevens (W). UFV also had a wrestling program, established in 2013. Due to lack of funding from the university, it was suspended in 2019.

The UFV men's basketball team captured the school's first-ever conference title in 2000 and went on to take the title again in 2002, 2004, and 2006, giving them four conference championships in a seven-year span. The women's basketball team won five straight provincial championships, bringing their all-time total to ten.

=== Residence ===
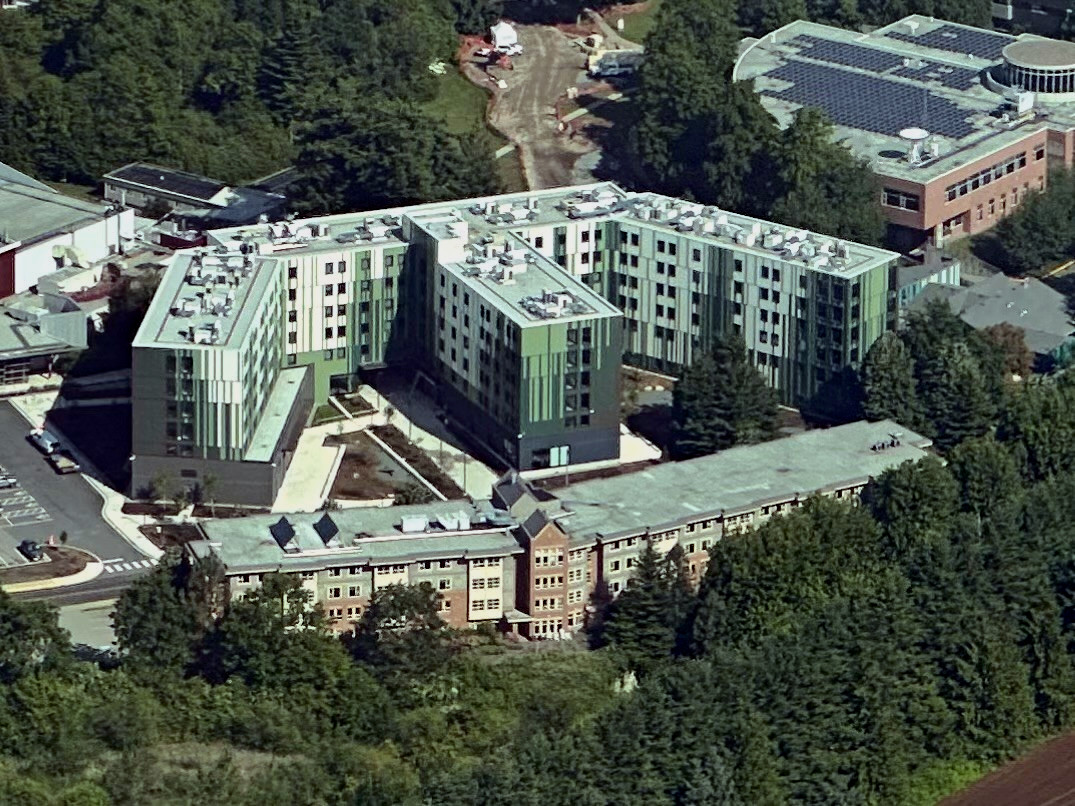
Aerial view of student housing, showing Baker House (front) and Evergreen (back), May 2026.

UFV has two student residences. Opened in 2007, Lá:léms Ye Baker, also known as Baker House, is located on the Abbotsford campus. It houses 102 suites with 204 bedrooms. Baker House is temporarily closed while it undergoes renovations. In January 2026, UFV opened a second adjacent six-story housing building, Lá:léms Ye Evergreen. It contains 60 four bedroom units, 50 studios, 106 single bedroom dorms and two staff apartments. Access is shared for kitchens, lounges and laundry facilities.

=== Student media ===
- The Cascade, student newspaper

The Cascade is the University of the Fraser Valley's student-run paper, with offices located on the university's campus in Abbotsford, British Columbia, Canada. While the paper's current era as The Cascade began in 1993, it began publication in the 1970s, under different names that would last only for a short number of years.

S Building on the Abbotsford campus is home to 101.7 CIVL-FM, the campus radio station.

== Notable alumni ==
- Keenan Beavis – businessman and writer
- Gary Collins – former B.C. MLA
- Dan Coulter – former B.C. MLA
- Kristina Halliwell Collins (withdrew) – social media personality and actress
- Bakul Harshadrai Dholakia – former Director of Indian Institute of Management Ahmedabad
- Nick Holden – former professional ice hockey player
- Tony Luck – incumbent B.C. MLA for Fraser-Nicola
- Iván Mejía – soccer player
- Harrison Mooney – journalist and writer
- Gwen O'Mahony – former B.C. MLA
- Barry Penner – lawyer and former B.C. MLA
- Bradley Peters – poet
- Doug Plumb – basketball coach and former player
- Kian Proctor – soccer player
- Dr. Darryl Plecas – former B.C. MLA and Speaker of the Legislative Assembly of British Columbia
- Lisa Roman – Olympic gold medal-winning rower
- Ross Siemens – incumbent mayor of Abbotsford
- Lauren Southern (withdrew), political activist and YouTuber
- Andy Thompson – actor and filmmaker
- Shalaya Valenzuela – Olympic silver medal-winning rugby union player
- Mark Village – soccer coach and former player
- Áʼa꞉líya Warbus – incumbent B.C. MLA for Chilliwack-Cultus Lake

== Notable professors ==
- Nicola I. Campbell (assistant professor) – Indigenous Studies
- Allyson Jule – Education, Community, and Human Development
- Thomas Puschmann (adjunct) – Business, Computing

== See also ==
- List of agricultural universities and colleges
- List of universities in British Columbia
- Higher education in British Columbia
- Education in Canada
