= Thomas Puschmann =

German academic

- Citizenship: Austrian, German and Swiss
- Occupations: Academic, economist
- Known for: Financial technology

Thomas Puschmann is an Austrian, German and Swiss academic in informatics specializing in financial technology.

== Biography ==
Puschmann is the founder and director of the Swiss FinTech Innovation Lab at the University of Zurich. He serves as the founder and executive director of the Global Center for Sustainable Digital Finance, a joint enterprise between Stanford University, the University of Zurich and KAIST that focuses on sustainable practices in digital finance. Puschmann is a professor of fintech at the University of Zurich and at the University of the Fraser Valley. He additionally co-founded the Swiss Green FinTech Network, the Association Swiss FinTech Innovations, and Extreme Tech Challenge Switzerland, and serves as a member of the Swiss Innovation Council of Innosuisse. He is also the editor-in-chief of the Springer book series Financial Innovation and Technology.

== Selected publications ==
=== Books ===
- Puschmann, Thomas; H.S.H. Prince Michael of Lichtenstein (2024). "Financial System 2030". Financial Innovation and Technology. doi:10.1007/978-3-031-55700-2. ISBN 978-3-031-55699-9.
- Alt, Rainer; Puschmann, Thomas (2016). "Digitalisierung der Finanzindustrie". SpringerLink. doi:10.1007/978-3-662-50542-7

=== Articles ===
- Puschmann, Thomas; Huang-Sui, Marine (2024). "A taxonomy for decentralized finance". International Review of Financial Analysis. 92: 103083. doi:10.1016/j.irfa.2024.103083. ISSN 1057–5219.
- Puschmann, Thomas; Quattrocchi, Dario (2023). "Decreasing the impact of climate change in value chains by leveraging sustainable finance". Journal of Cleaner Production. 429: 139575. doi:10.1016/j.jclepro.2023.139575. ISSN 0959-6526.
- Puschmann, Thomas; Hoffmann, Christian Hugo; Khmarskyi, Valentyn (2020). "How Green FinTech Can Alleviate the Impact of Climate Change—The Case of Switzerland". Sustainability. 12 (24): 1–30.
- Puschmann, Thomas (2017). "Fintech". Business & Information Systems Engineering. 59 (1): 69–76. doi:10.1007/s12599-017-0464-6. ISSN 1867-0202.
- Puschmann, Thomas; Alt, Rainer (2016). "Sharing Economy". Business & Information Systems Engineering. 58 (1): 93–99. doi:10.1007/s12599-015-0420-2. ISSN 1867-0202.
- Puschmann, Thomas; Alt, Rainer (2005). Soliman, Khalid S.; Janz, Brian D. (eds.). "Successful use of e‐procurement in supply chains". Supply Chain Management: An International Journal. 10 (2): 122–133. doi:10.1108/13598540510589197. ISSN 1359-8546.
