= School District 84 Vancouver Island West =

Canadian school district

Location
- Gold River Gold River, Tahsis, Zeballos in Vancouver Island Canada

District information
- Superintendent: Mr Lawrence Tarasoff
- Schools: 5
- Budget: CA$6.0 million

Students and staff
- Students: 445

Other information
- Website: www.sd84.bc.ca

School District 84 Vancouver Island West is a school district in British Columbia. It covers the northwest corner of Vancouver Island. This includes the major centre of Gold River and the remote communities of Tahsis, Zeballos and Kyuquot.

== Schools ==
School	Location	Grades
Captain Meares Elem-Secondary School	Tahsis	1–12
Gold River Secondary School	Gold River	8–12
Kyuquot Elementary Secondary School	Kyuquot	1–12
Ray Watkins Elementary School	Gold River	K–7
Zeballos Elem-Secondary School	Zeballos	K–12

== See also ==
- List of school districts in British Columbia
