= School District 49 Central Coast =

School in British Columbia, Canada

Location
- Hagensborg Bella Bella, Hagensborg, Bella Coola in Northeast Canada

District information
- Superintendent: Steve Dishkin
- Schools: 4
- Budget: CA$4.7 million

Students and staff
- Students: 209
- Teachers: S.A.M.S.S Principal : Jeremy Baillie B.C.E. Principal : Sharon Beloin

Other information
- Website: www.sd49.ca

School District 49 Central Coast is a school district in British Columbia. It covers the remote areas of coastal British Columbia north of Vancouver Island and south of Prince Rupert This includes the communities of Bella Coola, Hagensborg, Denny Island and Oweekeno (Rivers Inlet).

== Schools ==
School	Location	Grades
Bella Coola Elementary School	Bella Coola	K-5
Oweekeno Elementary School	Oweekeno	K-7
Shearwater Elementary School	Denny Island	K-11
Sir Alexander Mackenzie Secondary School	Hagensborg	8-12

== See also ==
- List of school districts in British Columbia
