= Fort Nelson Secondary School =

Fort Nelson Secondary

Location
- 5419 Simpson Trail PO Box 90; Fort Nelson, British Columbia, V0C 1R0; Canada; 58°48′35″N 122°42′45″W

Information
- School type: Public, high school
- School board: School District 81 Fort Nelson
- School number: 8181013
- Principal: Mark Lucas
- Staff: 27
- Grades: 8-12
- Language: English
- Colours: Burgundy and grey (Juniors) Black and Silver ( Senior)
- Team name: Huskies

Fort Nelson Secondary is a public high school in Fort Nelson, British Columbia, part of School District 81 Fort Nelson. In July 2005, the first solar array as a part of the Solar 4 Schools program was installed at the school. It is a 10 kW array.

== Athletics ==
In 2008, the senior boys basketball team made it to Single A provincials, the first time the boys have made it since the 1980s. The junior boys basketball team placed first in The Northern B.C Winter Games and Regionals. The school has a girls volleyball team ranging from juniors to seniors.
