= Keenan Beavis =

Canadian businessman and writer

- Education: University of the Fraser Valley
- Occupations: Businessman and writer

Keenan Beavis is a Canadian businessman and writer known for being the founder and chief executive officer of Longhouse, a branding and marketing agency based in Langley, British Columbia.

== Early life and education ==
At the age of 12, Beavis grew a YouTube channel to the 27th most-viewed in Canada.

Beavis was raised in Langley, British Columbia. He attended Blacklock Elementary, Murrayville Elementary, HD Stafford Middle School and Langley Senior Secondary. He attended University of the Fraser Valley (UFV) in Abbotsford, where he studied finance and economics and graduated with a bachelor's degree in business administration.

== Career ==
In high school, Beavis started a Pokémon themed e-commerce t-shirt business.

In 2018, he founded Longhouse Branding and Marketing (formerly Longhouse Media), a digital marketing agency.

He received the Indigenous Young Entrepreneur of the Year Award from the BC Achievement Foundation in 2020.

In 2022, Beavis was named to BCBusiness's 30 Under 30 list for British Columbia. In the same year, he was featured on an episode of the CHEK News program Our Native Land.

In 2024, he received the Young Distinguished Alumni Award from the University of the Fraser Valley.

The Canadian Council for Indigenous Business gave Beavis the Young Indigenous Entrepreneur of 2025 award. In the same year, he was named one of UFV's 50 Remarkable Alumni.

Beavis founded the Longhouse Business Award, which provides scholarships and startup funding to young indigenous entrepreneurs and business students.

== Personal life ==
Beavis has a background in martial arts such as judo and wrestling. He has trained in Brazilian jiu-jitsu for over a decade, achieving the rank of brown belt under Grand Master Marcus Soares.

Beavis is Métis on his mother's side. He has Métis Nation citizenship. He is a member of the Waceya Métis Society in Langley.

== Publications ==
In 2022, Beavis co-authored the book Grow Your Business with SEO.
