= Sir Alexander Mackenzie Secondary School =

Sir Alexander Mackenzie Secondary

Location
- Bag 800; Hagensborg, British Columbia, V0T 1H0; Canada; 52.3888°N 126.5400°W

Information
- School type: Public, high school
- Founded: October 30, 1949
- School board: School District 49 Central Coast
- School number: 4949002
- Principal: Barry Squires
- Staff: 24
- Grades: 8-12
- Enrollment: 86 (September 30, 2019)
- Colour: Royal Blue
- Mascot: Grizzly Bear
- Team name: Grizzlies
- Website: www.sd49.bc.ca/index.php?page=sir-alexander-mackenzie-school

Sir Alexander Mackenzie Secondary is a public high school in Hagensborg, British Columbia part of School District 49 Central Coast. It was named after the Scottish-Canadian explorer Sir Alexander MacKenzie, who was the first European to reach the Pacific Ocean overland.

== See also ==
- Education in British Columbia
- High schools in British Columbia
