= UFV Cascades =

Intercollegiate sports teams

- University: University of the Fraser Valley
- Association: U Sports
- Conference: Canada West
- Athletic director: Nick Sirski
- Location: Abbotsford, British Columbia
- First year: 1974; 52 years ago
- Varsity teams: 8 (4 men's, 4 women's)
- Basketball arena: UFV Athletic Centre
- Soccer stadium: Rotary Stadium
- Colours: Dark Green and Light Green
- Mascot: Sasq'ets the Sasquatch
- Website: gocascades.ca

The UFV Cascades are the athletic teams that represent the University of the Fraser Valley in Abbotsford, British Columbia and currently compete in the Canada West conference of U Sports. The Cascades varsity teams include basketball, golf, soccer, and volleyball; and clubs for baseball, and rowing.

== History ==
The Cascades had exclusively been a member of the PacWest conference of the Canadian Collegiate Athletic Association until 2006 when they were granted probationary membership into the Canada West conference of the then-named Canadian Interuniversity Sport (CIS). Basketball and soccer began competing in Canada West in the 2006–07 season. The Cascades became full members of Canada West in 2010. The varsity wrestling program was formed in 2013 and began competing in 2014. Despite its success, the wrestling program was suspended in 2019 when it was reported UFV did not fund the team and coaches. More of the school's varsity programs moved from the PacWest of the CCAA to Canada West of U Sports until both volleyball teams' move for the 2020–21 season meant that all varsity teams were competing in U Sports.

== Varsity teams ==
Men's sports	Women's sports
Basketball	Basketball
Golf	Golf
Soccer	Soccer
Volleyball	Volleyball

=== Basketball ===
==== Men's basketball ====
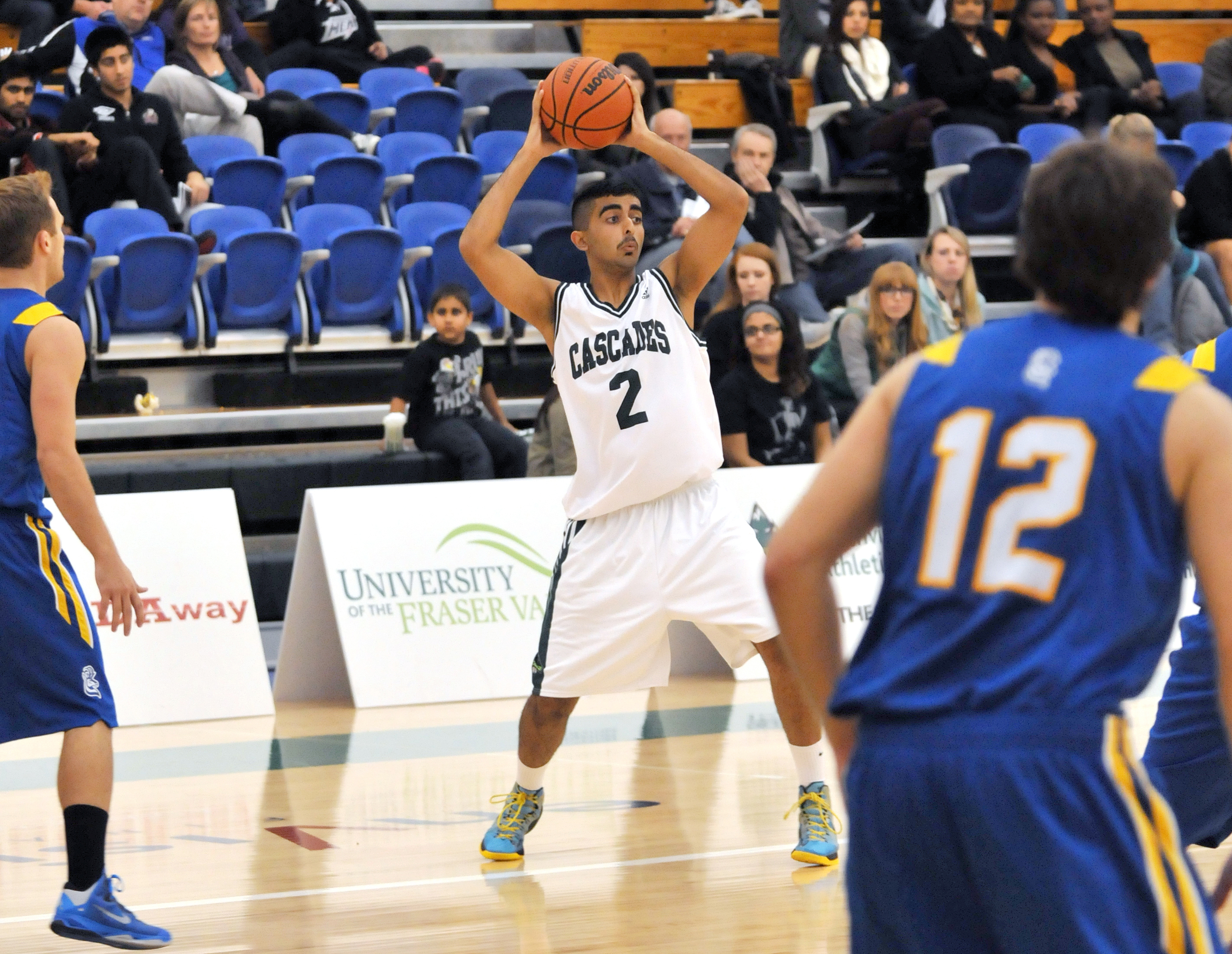
UFV v ULeth, 2013

In 2000, the men's basketball team captured its first PacWest conference championship after earning bronze medals in 1998 and 1999. The team again won conference bronze in 2001, but returned to conference championship gold medal winners in 2002, 2004, and 2006, with 2006 being their last as members of the PacWest. The team moved to the Canada West conference in 2006.

On March 26, 2020, Parm Bains, Daniel Adediran, and Kenan Hadzovic became the first UFV players to be selected in the Canadian Elite Basketball League Draft when they were all selected in the first, second, and third rounds, respectively, in the 2020 CEBL–U Sports Draft by the Fraser Valley Bandits.

==== Women's basketball ====
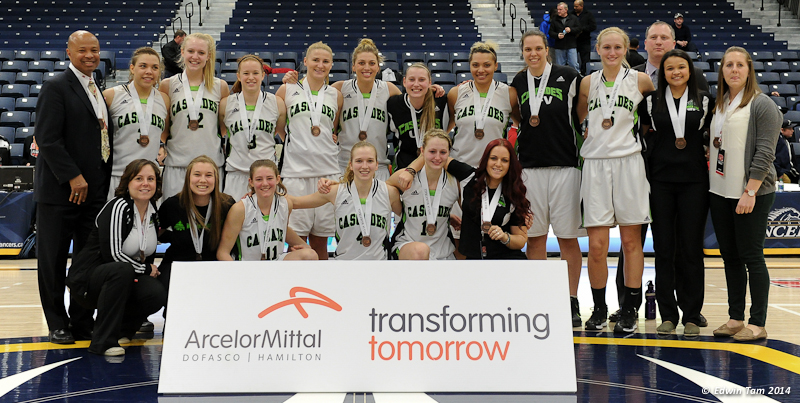
Bronze Medal winners at the 2014 Final 8 tournament

The Cascades women's basketball program has historically been one of the strongest at the school. While playing in the PacWest of the CCAA, the team won ten conference championships including five consecutively from 2001 to 2005. The team also won seven silver medals in the PacWest conference championship tournament. Following their move to U Sports in 2006, the program remained competitive, although have not yet won a conference championship. The team has, however, qualified for the national Final 8 Tournament twice, in 2013 and 2014, claiming a bronze medal finish in 2014.

=== Golf ===
The Cascades competed in the PacWest conference of the Canadian Collegiate Athletic Association until 2019 when the team moved to the Canada West conference of U Sports for the 2019–20 season.

=== Soccer ===
==== Men's soccer ====
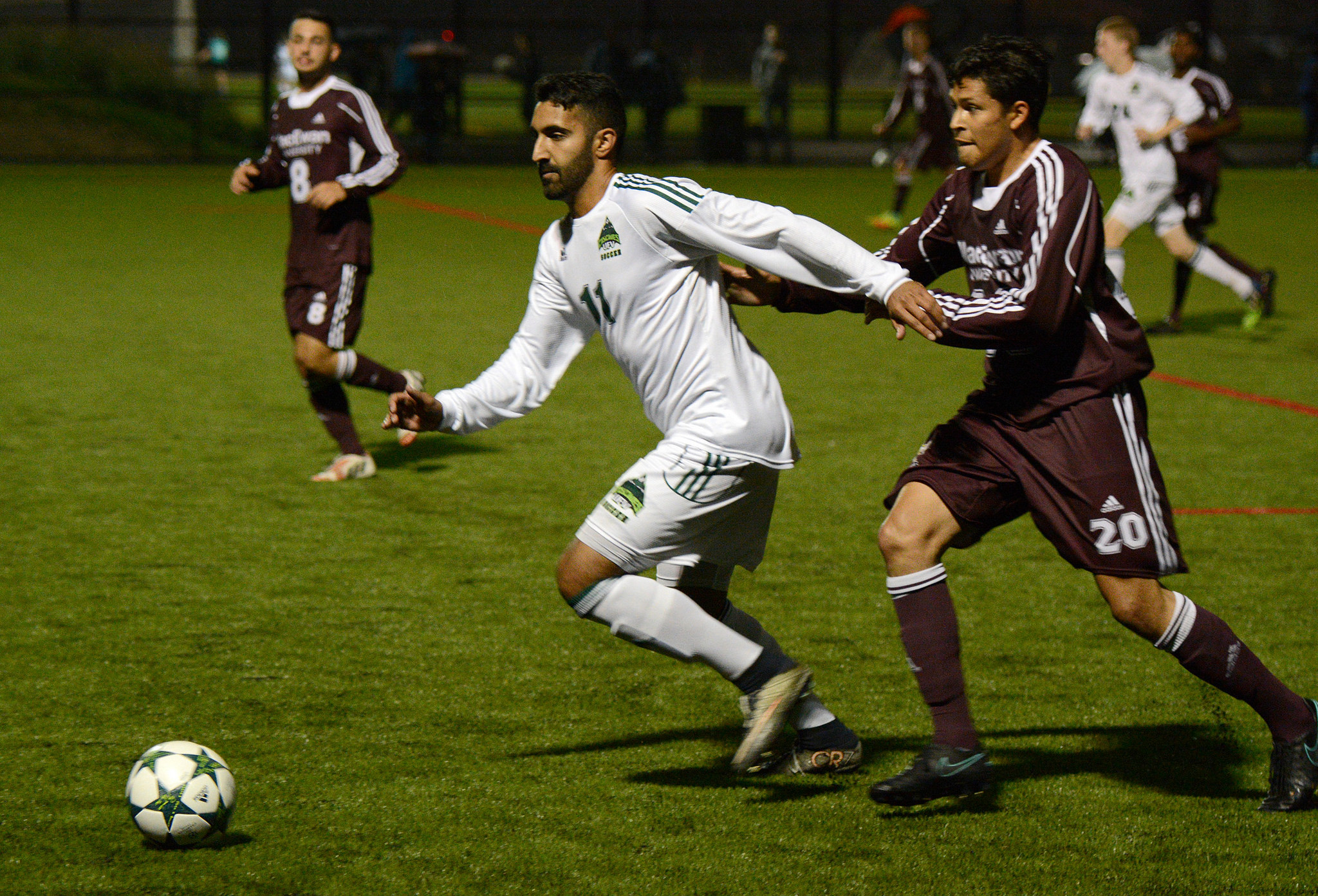
UFV men's soccer (in white) v MacEwan, 2016

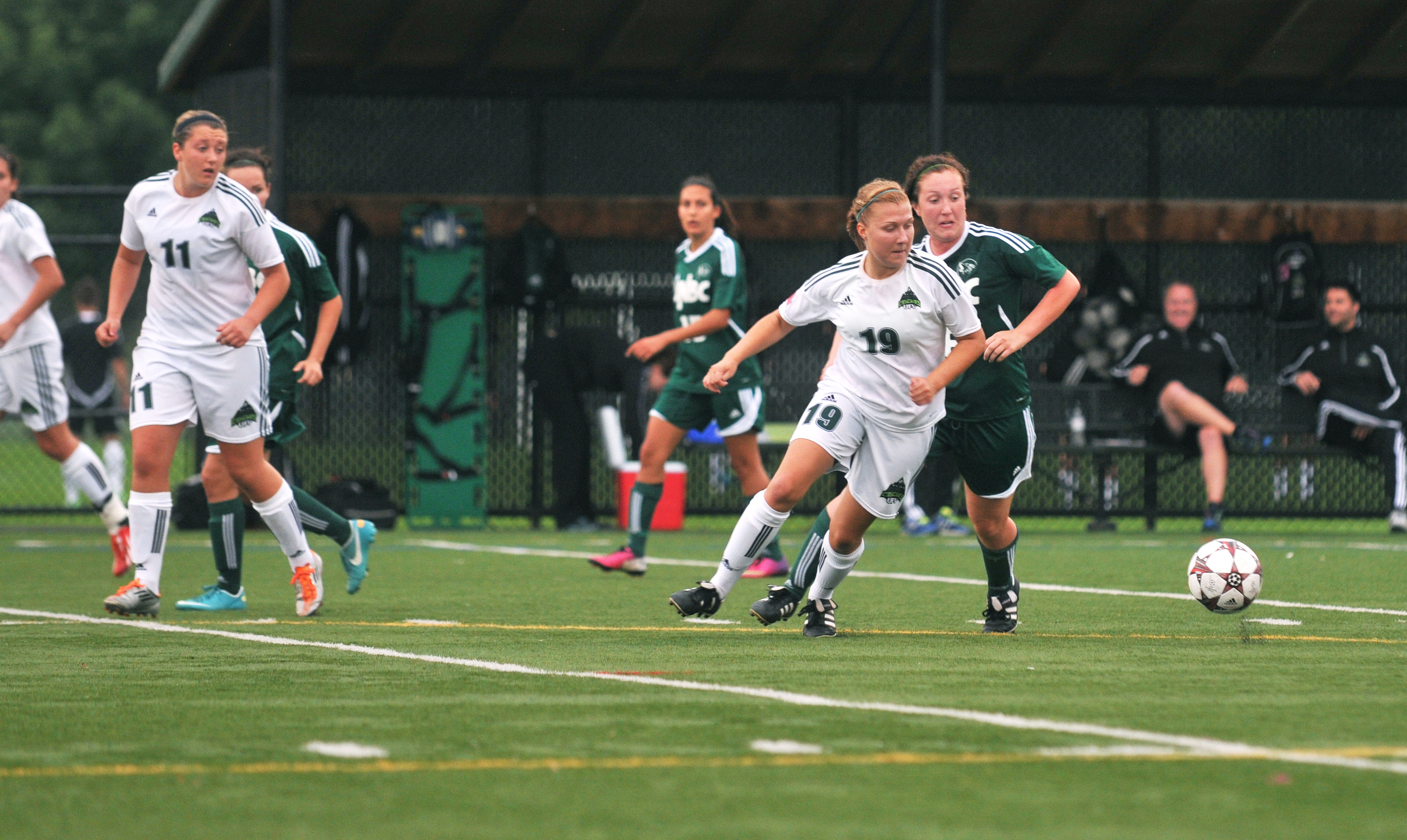
UFV women's soccer v TWU & UNBC, 2013

The Cascades men's soccer team won one conference championship, coming in 1996, while playing in the PacWest conference of the CCAA. The team also had one silver and one bronze finish. The program joined the Canada West conference of U Sports in 2006.

==== Women's soccer ====
The Cascades women's soccer team had three silver medal conference finishes and as well as three bronze medals while playing in the PacWest conference of the CCAA. The program joined the Canada West conference of U Sports in 2006 and claimed their one conference championship in 2010.

=== Volleyball ===
The men's and women's volleyball teams originally competed in the PacWest conference of the CCAA for two seasons from 1983 to 1985. Both programs were brought back in 2004 and continued to compete in the CCAA. On May 7, 2019, the Canada West conference of U Sports approved the admission of the Cascades' men's and women's volleyball teams for the 2020–21 season.

==== Men's volleyball ====
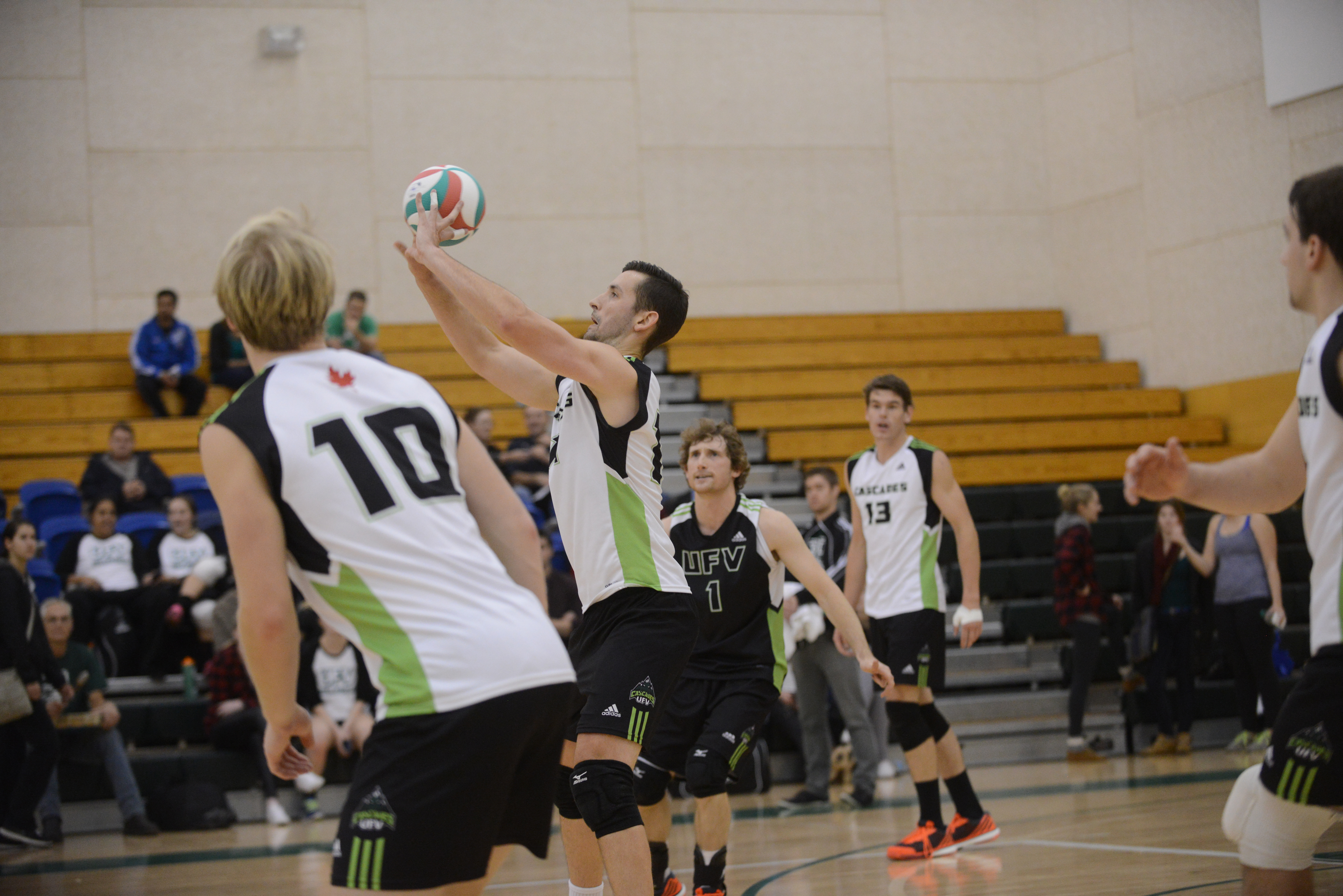
UFV men's volleyball vs Capilano in 2014

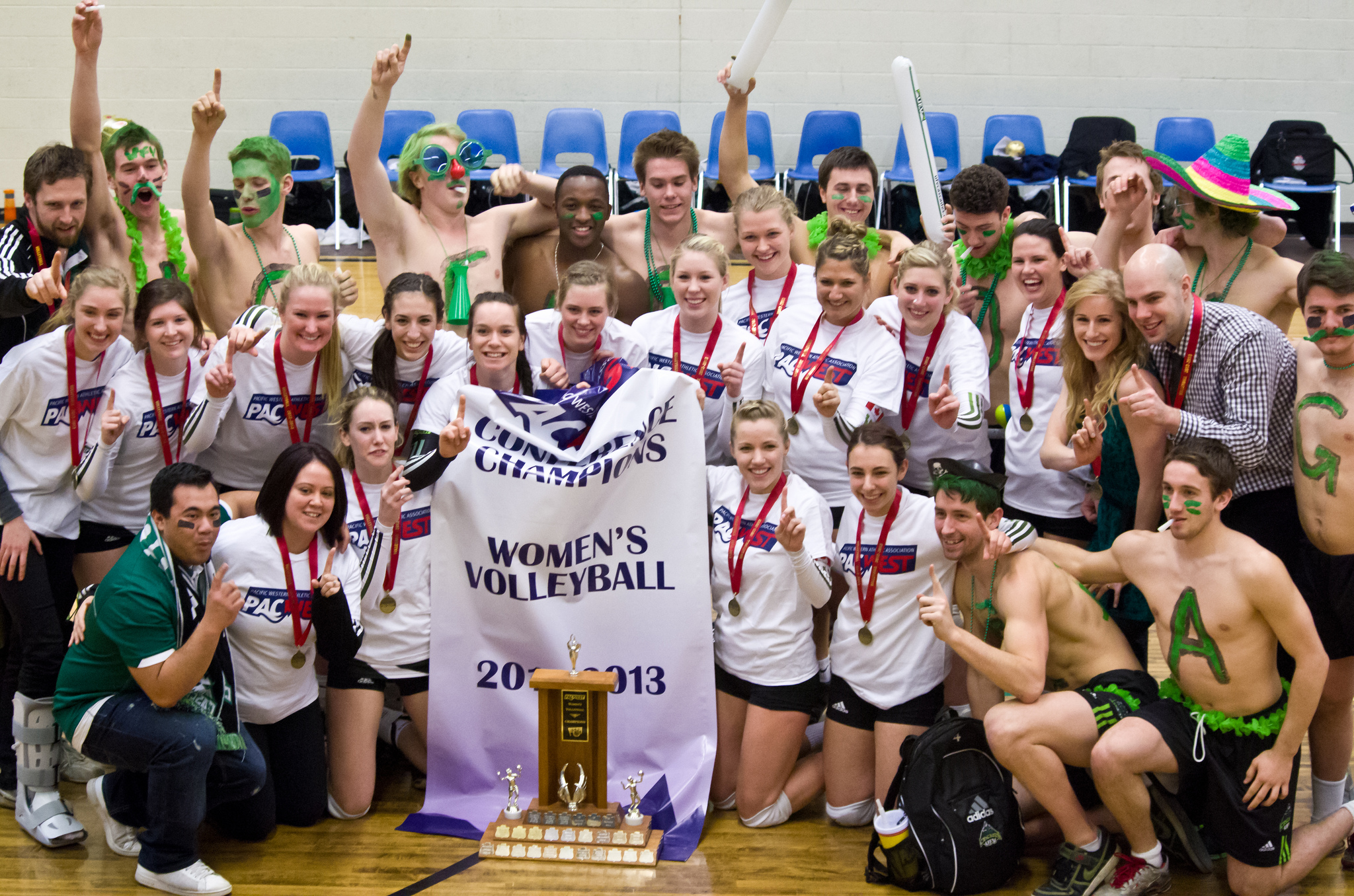
UFV women's volleyball, 2013 conference champions

The Cascades men's volleyball team won four conference silver medals and two conference bronze medals over their 18 years in the PacWest conference of the CCAA. The team also made two appearances in the national championship tournament in 2007 and 2009. The team became a U Sports member starting with the 2020–21 season.

==== Women's volleyball ====
The Cascades women's volleyball team has claimed one CCAA national championship, in 2013, as well as earning a bronze medal at the championship tournament in 2012. PacWest conference championship The program has also featured one gold medal conference champion, also in 2013, as well as yielding one conference silver medal team and four conference bronze medal teams. After 18 years of playing in the CCAA, the team moved to the Canada West conference of U Sports for the 2020–21 season.

=== Wrestling ===
The Cascades varsity men's and women's wrestling teams were formed in 2013 and began competing in 2014, becoming the first B.C. school with a Canadian Interuniversity Sport (CIS) wrestling program since Simon Fraser University (SFU) transferred to the NCAA after 2010. It was coached by volunteers Arjan Bhullar and Raj Virdi, both former CIS national champions from SFU. The varsity program was funded by community support and fundraising instead of money for existing teams. UFV previously had a non-varsity wrestling club on campus with around 20 athletes.

In January 2015, the Cascades men's team won their first tournament championship at the Golden Bear Open and was first in the CIS rankings. At the 2015 CIS Championships, Manheet Kalhon (120 kg) took silver. At the 2017 Canada West (CW) Championships, Brad Hildenbrandt (120 kg) won gold and Amtoj Dhaliwal (82 kg) took bronze for the men's team. For the women's team, Ashley Coupal (48 kg) and Karla Godinez (51 kg) took bronze, and Godinez was named female "rookie of the year." At the 2017 U SPORTS Championships, Hildenbrandt won UFV's first gold medal for wrestling. In 2018, the program was UFV's only nationally-ranked team. At the CW Championships, Hildenbrandt, Ana Godinez (63 kg), and Karla Godinez (55 kg) won gold. Karla was named the female "most outstanding wrestler" and Ana was named female "rookie of the year." At the U SPORTS Championships, the men's team came fifth and the women's team came ninth. For the men, Hildenbrandt (120 kg) and Parker McBride (54 kg) won gold, with Parker also being named male "rookie of the year." For the women, Ana Godinez (63 kg) and Karla Godinez (55 kg) both took silver. At the 2019 CW Championships, Hildenbrandt won gold at 120 kg for the third time in a row and was named the conference's male "wrestler of the year." At the 2019 U SPORTS Championships, the Cascades won five medals—Hildenbrandt won his third consecutive national championship, Ana Godinez won gold and was named the female "wrestler of the year", De'Andre Williams took silver, and Parker McBride and Amber Wiebe took bronze.

In April 2019, UFV suspended its wrestling program. It was reported that UFV was not funding the team and coaches. Originally established through community support and fundraising, the program was intended to be reviewed by UFV after three years for the potential of funding by the university. The review did not happen and the team continued to rely on fundraising, with the coaches working as volunteers. Virdi was fired in November 2018 followed by assistant coach Gurjot Kooner in December. Former national champion and world silver medalist Stacie Anaka then became the interim coach before resigning in March. Although UFV stated it would continue to support wrestlers individually, the suspension included "removal of athletic therapy, strength and conditioning services, athletic scholarship or tuition waivers, complimentary fitness centre access, early class registration and discounted parking at the school" as well as coaching and travel arrangements. Despite the suspension, UFV wrestlers competed successfully in the following season. At the 2020 CW Championships, Amarvir Atwal (76 kg) and Jason Bains (100 kg) won gold and Atwal was named the conference's male outstanding wrestler. Karan Dhillon (90 kg), Ali Rahguzar (68 kg), and Calista Espinosa (48 kg) took silvers. At the 2020 U SPORTS Championships, Bains and Dhillon took silver, Espinosa and Rahguzar took bronze, and Atwal placed fifth. However, Bains forfeited his silver medal after a doping infraction.

== Club teams ==
- Baseball
- Rowing
- Rugby 7s
