= Gudangaay Tlaats'gaa Naay Secondary School =

Public high school in Masset, British Columbia, Canada

Gudangaay Tlaats'gaa Naay Secondary

Location
- PO Box 208, 1647 Collison Ave. Masset, British Columbia, V0T 1M0; Canada; 54°00′41″N 132°08′41″W

Information
- School type: Public, high school
- School board: School District 50 Haida Gwaii/Queen Charlotte
- School number: 5050001
- Principal: Ian Keir
- Staff: 14
- Grades: 8-12
- Enrollment: 73 (2020–21)
- Language: English / Haida
- Area: Masset
- Team name: GTN Thunder
- Website: sd50.bc.ca/schools/gudangaay-tlaatsgaa-naay-secondary-school/

Gudangaay Tlaats'gaa Naay Secondary (formerly George M. Dawson Secondary School), is a public high school in Masset, British Columbia. It is one of two secondary schools and one of six schools in School District 50 Haida Gwaii. George Mercer Dawson Secondary officially opened on October 19, 1970, and was named after George Mercer Dawson, a Canadian scientist, surveyor and eminent authority on ethnology and archeology who undertook the Canadian Governments Geological Survey of Haida Gwaii, formerly named Queen Charlotte Islands. In September 2016, the school was renamed to Gudangaay Tlaats'gaa Naay Secondary by unanimous decision of the SD50 School Board.

Some internationally renowned Haida Artists such as Robert Davidson, Reginald Davidson and Jim Hart attended Masset High School prior to its renaming.
