= Salloomt River =

Coordinates: 52°23′52″N 126°32′15″W

The Salloomt River is a river in the Bella Coola Valley of the Central Coast region of British Columbia, Canada. It is a tributary of the Bella Coola River, flowing southwest out of the southernmost Kitimat Ranges to meet that river just upstream from the community of Hagensborg.

== See also ==
- List of rivers of British Columbia
