= School District 81 Fort Nelson =

School district in British Columbia, Canada

Coordinates: 58.8065°N 122.6963°W

Location
- Fort Nelson Northeastern British Columbia Canada

District information
- Superintendent: Mrs Diana Samchuck
- Schools: 5
- Budget: CA$11.4 million

Students and staff
- Students: 600 FTEs

Other information
- Website: www.sd81.bc.ca

School District 81 Fort Nelson is a school district in British Columbia. It covers the northeastern corner of the province up to the Alberta and Yukon borders. It is centered on the town of Fort Nelson and includes a large, mostly uninhabited area along the Alaska Highway.

Currently, due to a lack of qualified physician, Northern Health advised all pregnant patients that they must travel to other regions (e.g. Fort St John, Grande Prairie, Kelowna) to give birth to their babies. All expecting mothers are asked to sign a waiver of understanding. The travel fee and accommodation expenses are not reimbursed. Lack of access to maternal care has deterred many young professionals to relocate for work.

Despite significant increase in education funding throughout the province, Fort Nelson school district registered the second highest decrease in overall budget over the last five years. The aggregate funding has decreased by 12.5% since the 2015/16 school year, making the district an outlier in reduced enrolment.

== Schools ==
School	Location	Grades
Fort Nelson Secondary School	Fort Nelson	8-12
G W Carlson Elementary School	Fort Nelson	K-4
J S Clark Elementary School	Fort Nelson	K-4
R L Angus Intermediate School	Fort Nelson	5-7
Toad River Elem-Secondary School	Toad River	K-12

== See also ==
- List of school districts in British Columbia
