= École Mission Senior Secondary School =

Senior high school in Mission, British Columbia, Canada

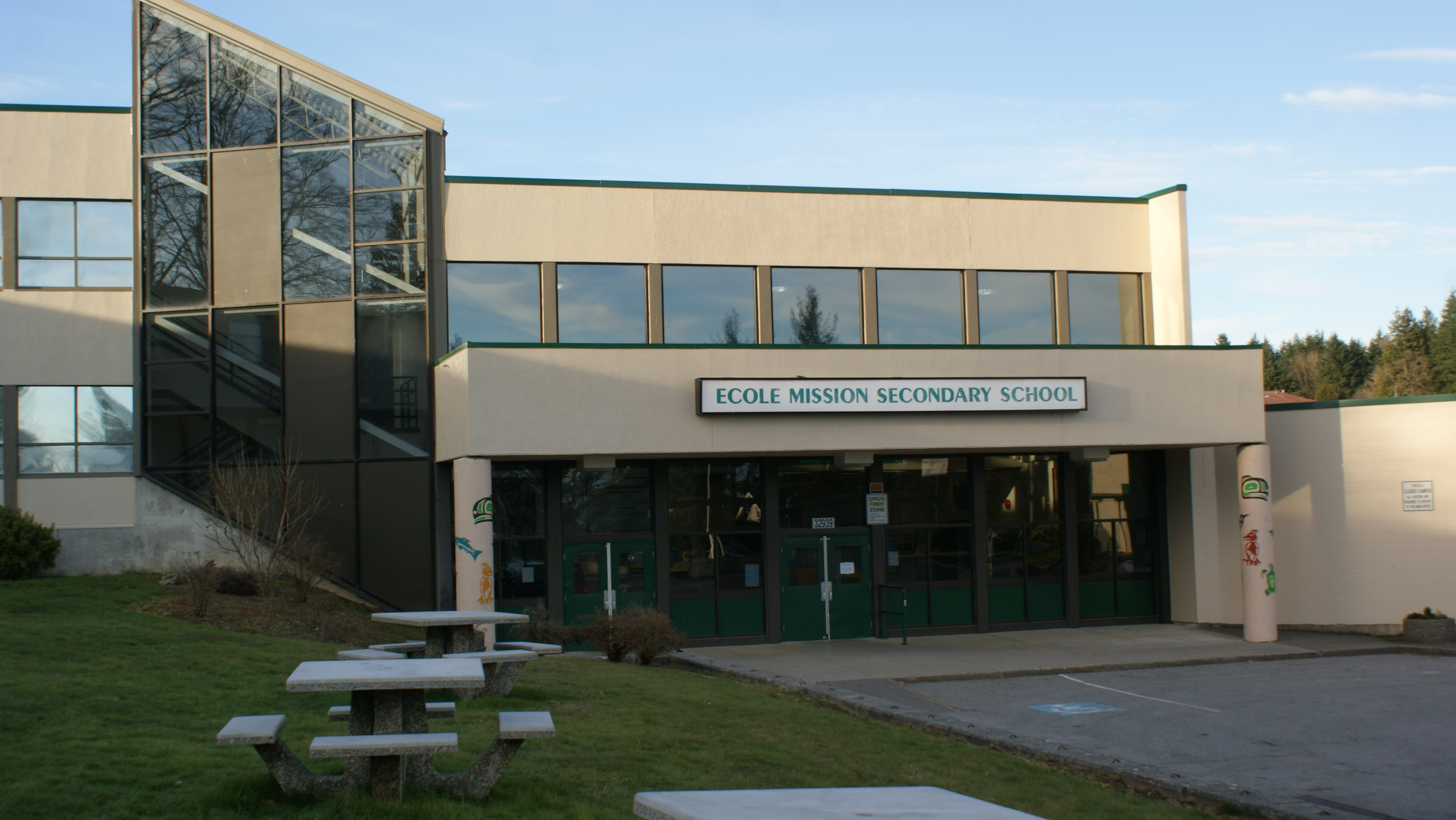

Location
- Lund Avenue; Mission, British Columbia, V2V 2C5; Canada; 49.1411°N 122.31222°W

Information
- School type: Public, senior high school
- Motto: "Carpe diem"
- Established: 3 December 1952
- School district: 75
- Principal: Jim Pearce
- Staff: 98
- Grades: 10–12
- Language: English & French
- Team name: Mission Roadrunners
- Feeder schools: Heritage Park Middle School & Hatzic Middle School
- Website: mss.mpsd.ca
- Last updated: May 22, 2023

École Mission Secondary School is a high school located in Mission, British Columbia, Canada. It was established in 1952, and is the longest serving secondary school in the District of Mission. It is currently the only high school within the district.

== Transition ==
Before 2017, the 75th school district had two other high schools alongside Mission Secondary: Heritage Park Secondary School and Hatzic Secondary School. In October 2014, the Mission School Board announced that they would make Mission Secondary School the only high school in the area. The change came into effect during the 2017–2018 school year. The change officially dissolved both Heritage Park and Hatzic Secondary School down to middle school status.

=== Plans to rebuild ===
The Mission School Board announced in March 2023 that they had funding and planned to make replace the secondary school building. In April 2024, Rachna Singh (BC's education minister) announced the district had received $175 million to replace the current high school starting in 2028, and planned to complete it during the 2029–2030 school year. Singh said, "Mission Secondary students will remain in the current school until the new building is complete. The current school will be demolished after the replacement is finished."

== École Heritage Park Middle School ==
École Heritage Park Middle School

Location
- 33700 Prentis Ave, Mission, BC V2V 7B1; 49.14346°N 122.29039°W

Information
- School type: Public, middle school
- Established: 1952-2017 (as Heritage Park Secondary School); 2017–present (as École Heritage Park Middle School)
- School district: 75
- Principal: Marcello Gabriele
- Grades: 7-9
- Language: English, French
- Website: https://hpms.mpsd.ca/

École Heritage Park Middle School is a middle school located in the eastern half of Mission, British Columbia, Canada. The building was established in 1952 (as Heritage Park Secondary School) but was officially turned into a middle school in 2017. The building has a rough perimeter of 600m, and two stories. It enrolls about 700 students each year. In 1996, UFV and the Mission School District had partnered to open the Heritage Park Centre, which merged UFV into the north-east corner of the building.

École Heritage Park Middle School offers French immersion.
