= School District 74 Gold Trail =

School district in British Columbia, Canada

Location
- Ashcroft Ashcroft, Cache Creek, Clinton, Lytton, Lillooet in Okanagan/Mainline Canada

District information
- Superintendent: Vessy Mochikas
- Schools: 9
- Budget: CA$19.5 million

Students and staff
- Students: 1100

Other information
- Website: www.sd74.bc.ca

School District 74 Gold Trail is a school district in British Columbia. It covers the area of the northern Fraser Canyon along Highway 1. This district includes the communities of Ashcroft, Clinton, Lytton, Lillooet and Cache Creek and Seaton Portage BC. It is notable for having a high percentage of students with self identified aboriginal ancestry, currently standing at an overall average of 60%. The school district is known for supporting innovative programs such as the Connected Classroom project and the Summit Project. The district is also known for higher than average success rates for both aboriginal and non aboriginal students, and an increasing profile provincially for new models of shared service efficiency between districts through Sr. Staff positions. The district is also known for innovation in governance at the board level by supporting a co-chair model for both the Board of Education and the district's First People's Education Council. The Board of Education has many members engaged in provincial leadership through the British Columbia School Trustees Association and the Thompson Okanagan Branch Association. The district works with nineteen First Nations Bands, more than any other district in British Columbia.

== History ==
School District 74 was created in 1996 with the merger of School District No. 29 Lillooet and School District No. 30 South Cariboo.

== Schools ==
School	Location	Grades
Cache Creek Elementary School	Cache Creek	K-7
Cayoosh Elementary School	Lillooet	K-7
David Stoddart School	Clinton	K-12
Desert Sands Community School	Ashcroft	K-12
George M Murray Elementary School	Lillooet	K-7
Gold Bridge Community School	Gold Bridge	K-7
Kumsheen Secondary School	Lytton	8-12
Lillooet Secondary School	Lillooet	8-12
Lytton Elementary School	Lytton	K-7

== See also ==
- List of school districts in British Columbia
