= Firvale =

- Location of Firvale in British Columbia
- Coordinates: 52°25′59″N 126°17′05″W
- Country: Canada
- Province: British Columbia
- Region: Bella Coola Valley
- Regional district: Central Coast
- Time zone: UTC−07:00 (PT)
- Highways: Highway 20
- Waterways: Bella Coola River

Firvale is an unincorporated community in the Bella Coola Valley region of west central British Columbia, Canada. On the north shore of the Bella Coola River about 6 kilometres (4 mi) west of the mouth of Burnt Bridge Creek, no link exists to the former centre on the south shore. On BC Highway 20, the locality is by road about 412 kilometres (256 mi) west of Williams Lake and 41 kilometres (25 mi) east of Bella Coola.

== Earlier community ==
The monopoly for Norwegians to colonize the Bella Coola Valley ended in 1899. Immigrants of various origins subsequently arrived, until a Seventh-day Adventist (SDA) cluster formed upstream.

In 1904, F. A. Johnson, an SDA, built a homestead in the area. Over the following years, other Adventist families came, also looking for a remote area that would serve as a refuge, while awaiting the Second Coming, believed to be imminent. By 1907, an SDA church was established. The SDA Bella Coola/Firvale school opened in 1909.

By the 1910s, telephone lines connected the lower valley from the exchange at Hagensborg, which was the nearest community, located about 29 kilometres (18 mi) by wagon road downstream. By mid-decade, Firvale was essentially a general store surrounded by ranches.

The post office, which operated 1907–1917, was initially called Sloan, until renamed Firvale in 1912. The location was within the federal electoral district of Comox—Atlin, which was represented by William Sloan 1904–1909. The predominance of Douglas fir in the Bella Coola Valley likely inspired the Firvale rename.

In 1920, the SDA school closed. That year, the public school opened.

After a flood destroyed most of the farms, families moved away. In 1930, the SDA community and local church disbanded. Around 1932, the public school closed.

After re-opening in 1945, the one-room school (attached to a small teacherage) closed in 1955.

In 1967, BC Hydro extended transmission lines to the community.

The general store operated at least until the mid-1970s.

Cariboo West Stages provided a Williams Lake–Bella Coola bus service from 1973 until at least the late 1980s.

== Ferries, bridges, and roads ==
Immediately to the west, Canoe Crossing was where the Bella Coola River was crossed to reach the steep trail on the north bank, now known as the Capoose Summer Trail.

To surmount the need of swimming horses through the current, Mr. Hawkinson and son installed a tolled ferry around 1907, but settlers were soon demanding a bridge. At this time, a wagon road stretched up the Bella Coola Valley to this point.

In 1912, a 37-metre (123 ft) bridge replaced the ferry.

In the mid-1910s, a ferry was installed at the 35.5-mile post (west of Stuie) and/or the 31-mile post (Burnt Bridge).

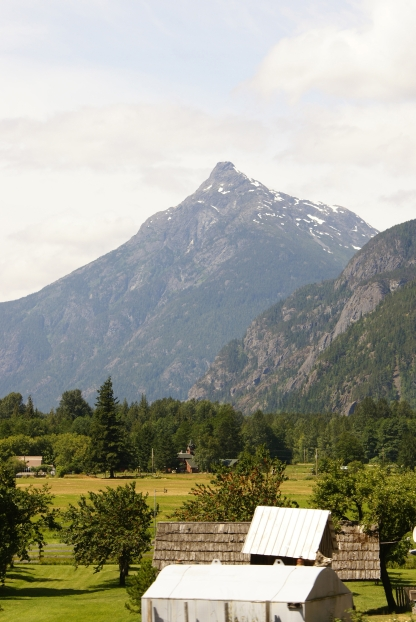
Firvale and Saloompt Mountain, 2008

In 1924–25, high water damaged the Canoe Crossing bridge. In 1930, the structure was replaced. In 1967–68, high water destroyed the bridge. Since the highway from the west had long relocated to the north shore the redundant structure was not repaired prior to removal.

== Later community ==
The Canoe Crossing boat launch is on the opposite side of the highway to the Capoose Summer Trail.

During September–October in 2016 and 2017, a bull moose, which wandered to Firvale, spent the hunting season protected among a herd of cattle.

In 2020, the Firvale Wilderness Camp opened. The accommodation was a rustic lodge, A-frame cabins, and glamping domes. In 2021, the owners submitted a belated rezoning application to address previously completed work. Camp events were expanded for the 2023 season.

The current passenger transit provider is BC Transit, which offers a request service.

== Nearby locations ==
The general area is near the southwest corner of Tweedsmuir South Provincial Park.

=== Burnt Bridge Creek ===
In 1793, Alexander MacKenzie of the North West Company (NWC) followed the Grease Trail westward from what became Quesnel. Descending the trail along Burnt Bridge Creek, his party was warmly received at a First Nations village just north of the creek mouth. The former name was the Kahylktst River. The community honored them with a feast of salmon prior to retiring for the night.

The place was called Friendly Village by MacKenzie but Nootkleia or Newcliff by surveyors in the early 1860s. Nothing remained of the village a century later.

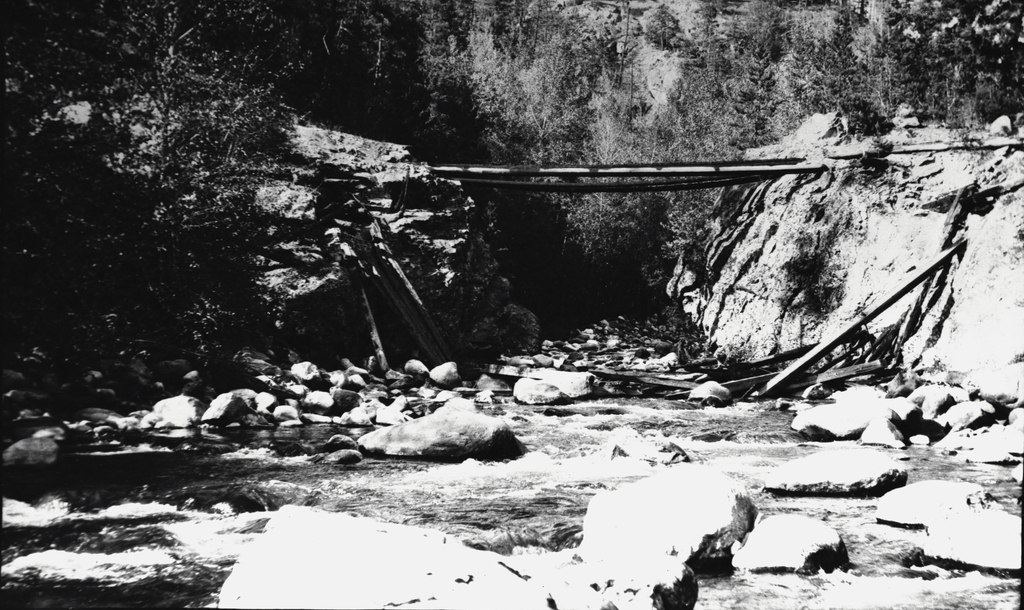
Bridge, Burnt Bridge Creek, 1920

The local name of Burnt Bridge Creek arose from an anecdote about a man who set fires at both ends of the bridge to ward off bears during the night. By 1912, this name was in common usage, and a wagon road stretched up the Bella Coola Valley to this point, before reducing to a pack-trail. Although the Canoe Crossing trail was seasonally open July–September, the Burnt Bridge trail was open a month longer.

In 1988, a cairn was unveiled at Burnt Bridge to commemorate the designation of the Alexander MacKenzie Heritage Trail.

In 1990, the present highway bridge was built.

=== Snowshoe Creek Conservation Area ===
Immediately west of lower Burnt Bridge Creek is the 122-hectare (300-acre) Snowshoe Creek Conservation Area. A local couple, who purchased the land in 2018 to create a bird sanctuary, instead donated the property to the NCC in 2021. In addition to protecting forest birds, the land also enhances salmon and trout habitat and provides a secure travel corridor for large mammals through the Bella Coola Valley.

=== McCall Flats Recreation Area ===
Immediately south of the southwest corner of the provincial park is the McCall Flats Recreation Area, which includes camping sites and pit toilets.

== Maps ==
- "Shell BC map". www.davidrumsey.com. 1956.
- Tweedsmuir Trail (and general area). 1983.
