= School District 75 Mission =

School district in British Columbia, Canada

Location
- Mission Mission, Hatzic, Dewdney, McConnell Creek, Dewdney, Nicomen Island, Deroche, Lake Errock in Fraser Valley Canada

District information
- Superintendent: Mr Angus Wilson
- Schools: 17
- Budget: CA$59 million

Students and staff
- Students: 7086

Other information
- Website: www.mpsd.ca

School District 75 Mission is a school district in the Central Fraser Valley of British Columbia . Centered in Mission, immediately north of Abbotsford, British Columbia, it extends eastward beyond that municipality along the north side of the Fraser River as far as Lake Errock and Deroche.

== Schools ==
School	Location	Grades
Albert McMahon Elementary School	Mission	K-6
Cherry Hill Elementary School	Mission	K-6
Christine Morrison Elementary School	Mission	K-6
Deroche Elementary School	Deroche	K-6
Dewdney Elementary School	Dewdney	K-6
Edwin S Richards Elementary School	Mission	K-6
Hatzic Elementary School	Mission	K-6
Hatzic Middle School	Mission	7-9
École Heritage Park Middle School	Mission	7-9
Hillside Traditional Academy	Mission	K-6
Mission Central Elementary School	Mission	K-6
École Mission Senior Secondary School	Mission	10-12
Riverside College (Mission, British Columbia)	Mission	Extended Learning
Silverdale Elementary School	Mission	K-6
Mission Online School	Mission	7-12
West Heights Elementary School	Mission	K-6
Windebank Elementary School	Mission	K-6

== See also ==
- List of school districts in British Columbia
