= Daajing Giids =

- Village
- Village of Daajing Giids
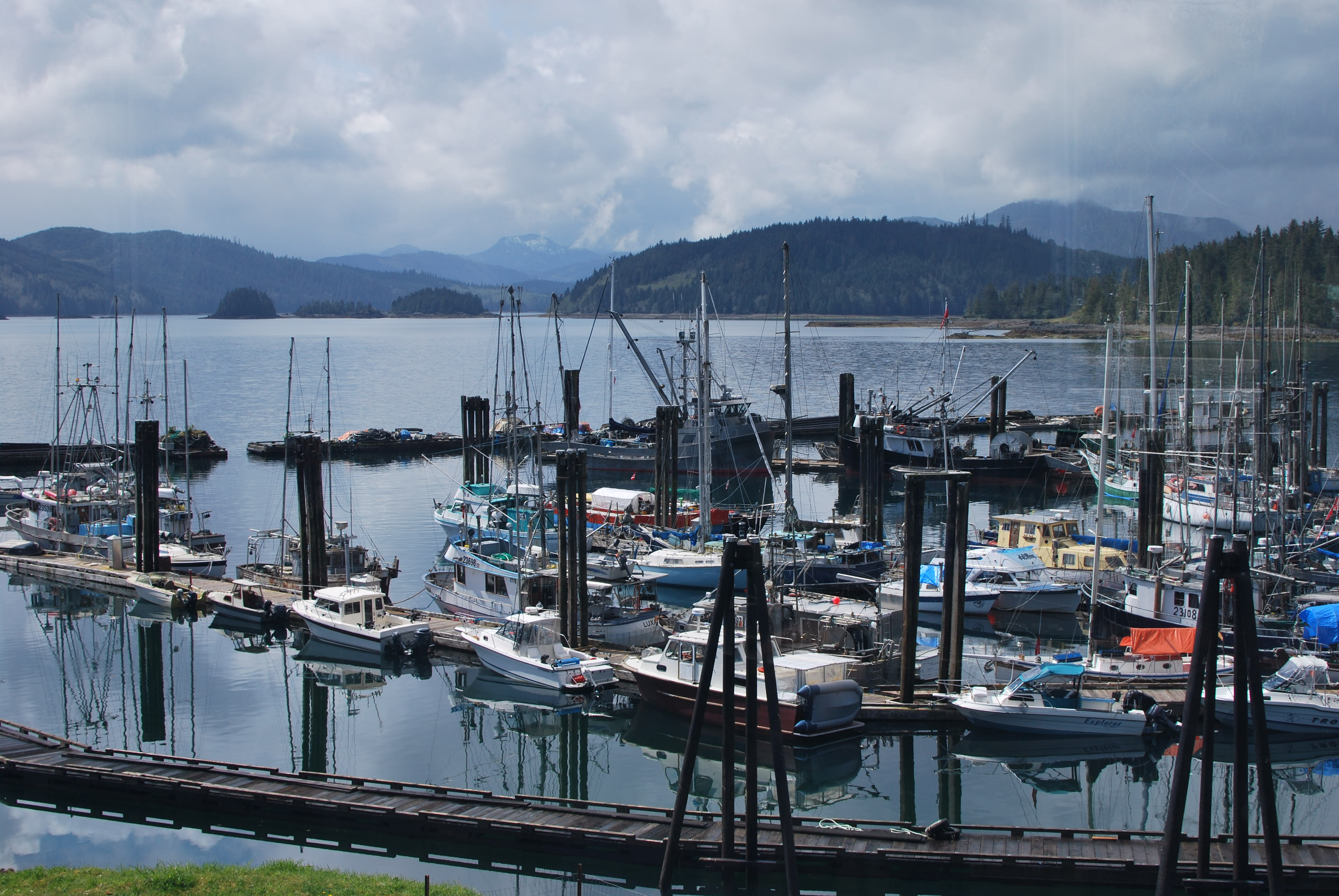
- City Harbour

- Location within British Columbia
- Coordinates: 53°15′17″N 132°06′9″W
- Country: Canada
- Province: British Columbia
- Region: Haida Gwaii
- Regional district: North Coast
- Founded: 1908
- Incorporated: 2005

Government
  - Type: Mayor-council government
  - Governing body: Daajing Giids Village Council
  - Mayor: Lisa Pineault

Area
  - Total: 37.28 km^{2} (14.39 sq mi)
- Elevation: 20 m (66 ft)

Population (2021)
  - Total: 964
  - Density: 27.1/km^{2} (70/sq mi)
- Time zone: UTC-7 (MST)
- Postal code: V0T1S0
- Website: daajinggiids.ca

Daajing Giids (/ˈdɔːdʒɪŋ ɡiːds/ DAW-jing GEEDS), known as Queen Charlotte City from 1891–2022, is a village municipality in the Haida Gwaii archipelago (formerly known as the Queen Charlotte Islands) in the province of British Columbia, Canada. It is located on the southern end of Graham Island at Skidegate Inlet and is a member municipality of the North Coast Regional District.

The name "Queen Charlotte" dates back to 1787 when Captain George Dixon was on a trading cruise along the coast. He named the island for his two hundred-ton vessel, the Queen Charlotte. The village was founded in 1891 and in 1908 was the first townsite registered in the islands, although it wasn't incorporated as a municipality until 2005. It was previously represented as part of Electoral Area F of that regional district, which was coterminous with the Haida Gwaii archipelago (which now comprises Electoral Areas D and E). The town site was established when the first sawmill in the archipelago began operating in 1908. In the wake of World War I, additional work force was needed to supply allied warplanes with lumber. The town infrastructure quickly developed, offering public education, a hospital, general stores and other amenities, even a newspaper.

Logging and fishing were the main source of jobs when the demand for lumber again increased by the second half of the 20th century. Today, few inhabitants are working in these resource-based jobs and a recent shift towards tourism-oriented employment has been observed, although the main economic driver is government jobs, including: hospital workers, school district, BC Ferries, local Forestry and Parks offices etc.

The village was incorporated in 2005 and offers several motels, shops, restaurants, a gas station and auto repair, a credit union, RCMP station and a hospital. It is also the location of the Daajing Giids Visitor Centre, which is open year-round. With its small harbour, Daajing Giids is often the starting-point for chartered tours into Gwaii Haanas National Park Reserve and Haida Heritage Site on southern Moresby Island.

On May 16, 2022, the village had its ancestral name of Daajing Giids restored with a unanimous council vote — the first in B.C. to do so, according to the provincial government. The village was known as Queen Charlotte from 1891–2022.

Daajing Giids includes within its boundaries Skidegate Landing with its BC Ferries landing and connections to Prince Rupert.

== Demographics ==
In the 2021 Census of Population conducted by Statistics Canada, Daajing Giids had a population of 964 living in 488 of its 574 total private dwellings, up 9% from 2016. With a land area of 35.58 km^{2} (13.74 sq mi), it had a population density of 27.1/km^{2} (70.2/sq mi) in 2021.

== Healthcare ==
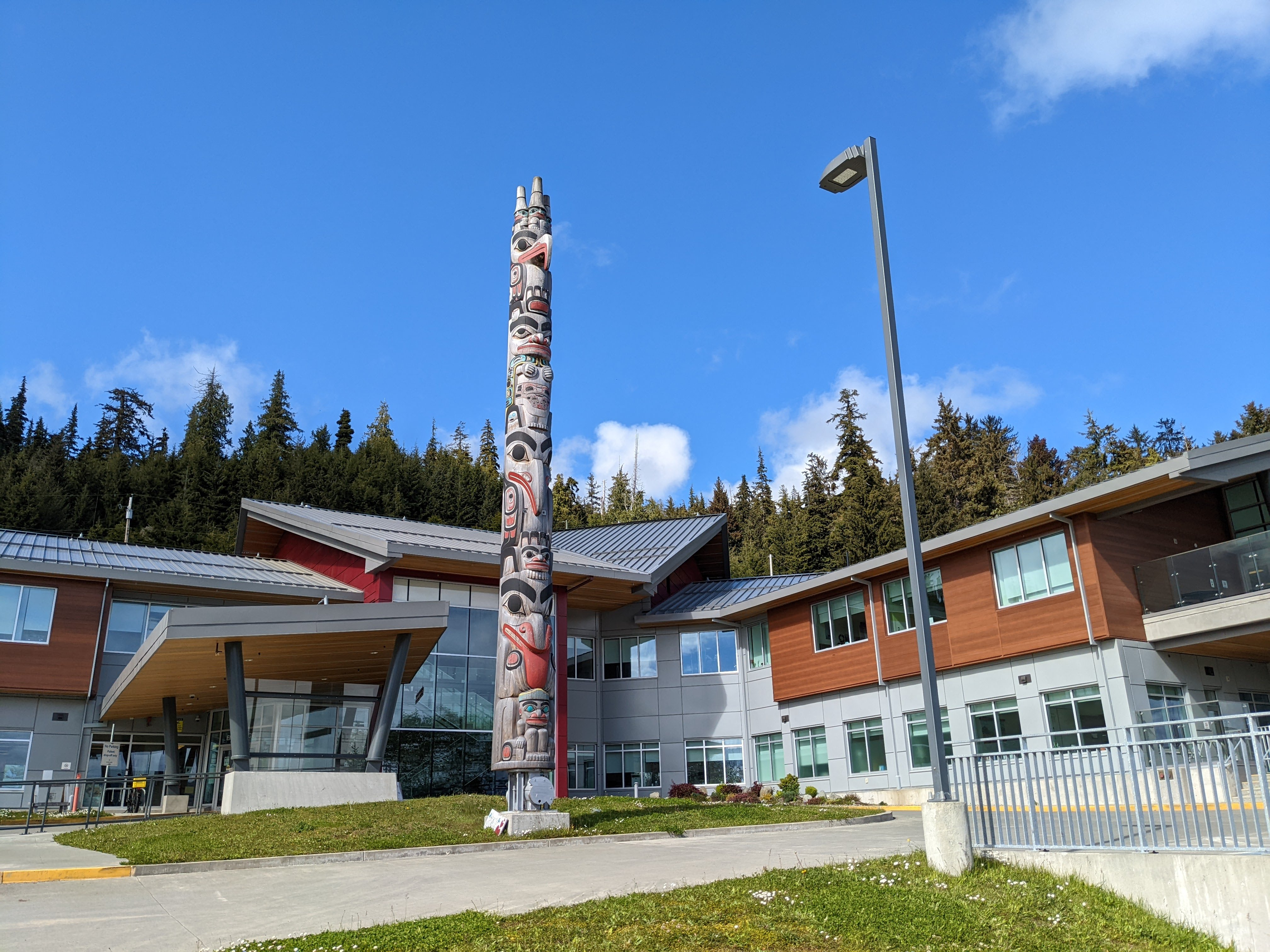
Hospital in Daajing Giids

A new hospital opened in Daajing Giids in 2016 and has eight in-patient and eight long-term beds. It is officially known as Haida Gwaii Hospital and Health Centre or X̱aayda Gwaay Ngaaysdll Naay.
