= Hagensborg =

Community in the country of Canada

Coordinates: 52°23′N 126°34′W

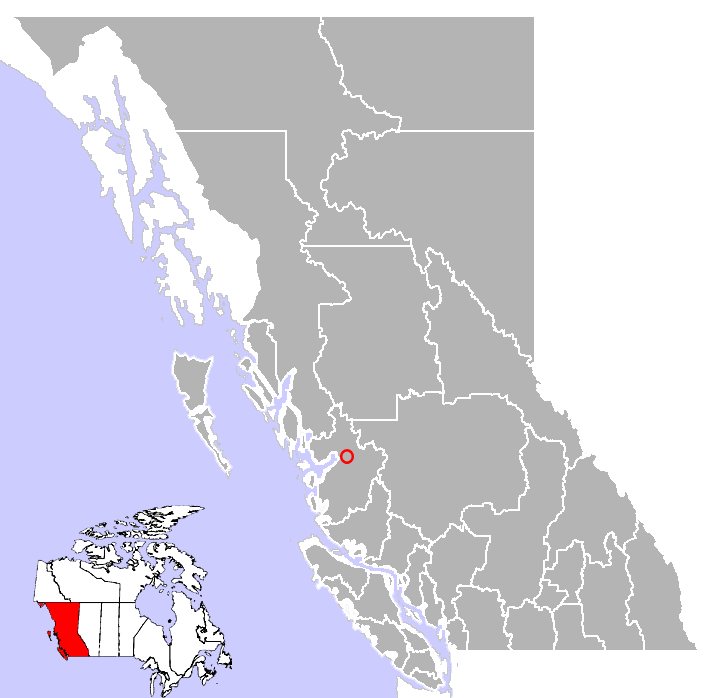
Location of Hagensborg in British Columbia

Hagensborg, originally named Kristiania, is an unincorporated community in the Bella Coola Valley in British Columbia, Canada. Its census population in 2021 was 273.

== History ==
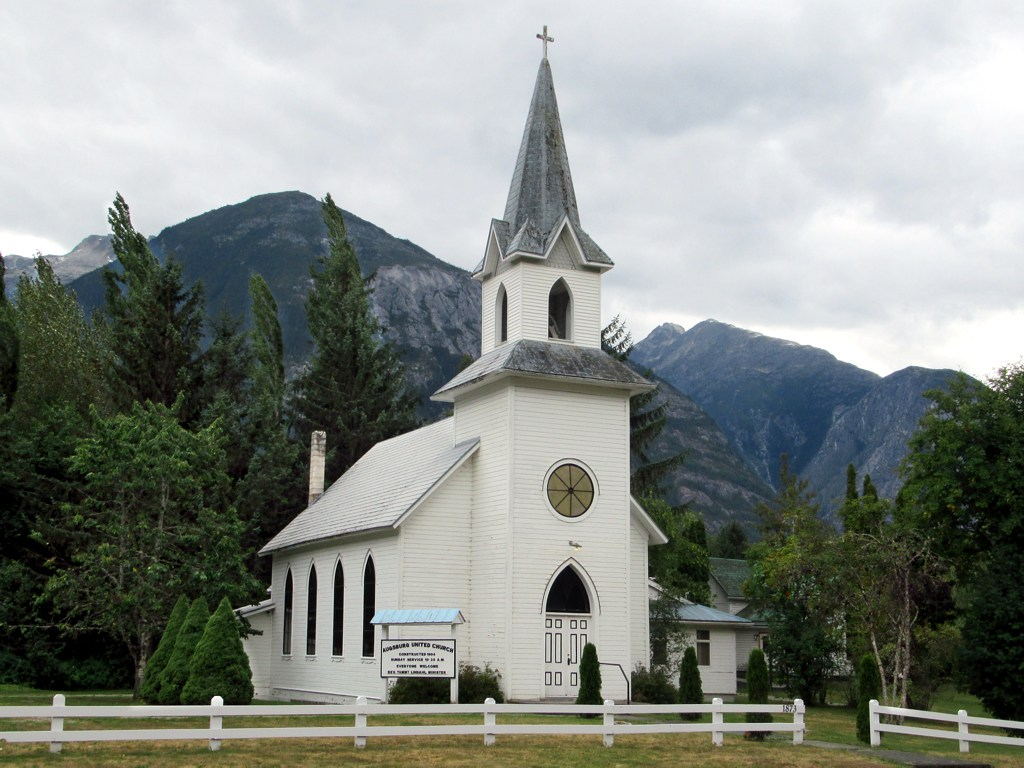
Augsburg Church built in 1904 in Hagensborg

The Bella Coola Valley was inhabited by the Nuxálk people when European explorers arrived, first of them being Sir Alexander Mackenzie, and they remain a lasting presence in the community. Norwegian settlers from Minnesota and Wisconsin arrived in 1894, and under the guidance of the Reverend Christian Saugstad (the namesake of nearby Mount Saugstad) established a colony. The colony was named "Hagen's Borg" after Hagen B. Christensen, the first storekeeper in the area and postmaster from April 1, 1896 to October 14, 1910 (also the namesake of nearby Hagen's Peak) . ("borg" is Norwegian for a fortress or castle).

== Transportation ==
Hagensborg is served by Highway 20, which runs from Williams Lake to Bella Coola, at the mouth of the Bella Coola River on the North Bentinck Arm. In order to access the Bella Coola Valley via Highway 20, a portion of the called Heckman Pass (also known as "The Hill" or "The Precipice") must be traversed. This route is sitting at an elevation of 1487 metres and contains treacherous switchbacks and hairpin turns, shared by a single-lane gravel road. The Bella Coola Airport is located in Hagensborg, and is served by Pacific Coastal Airlines who makes daily flights in and out from Vancouver and Anahim Lake. Charter services by plane and helicopter are also available.

== Government ==
=== Local ===
Hagensborg is not incorporated as a municipality. Its local government representation is provided through the Central Coast Regional District (CCRD). CCRD Electoral Areas "C" and "D" each include parts of Hagensborg. The eastern portion is part of Electoral Area "C", while the western portion is part of Electoral Area "D".

- Electoral Area C director: Rita Svisdahl
- Electoral Area D director: Garrett Newkirk

=== Provincial ===
Hagensborg is located within the North Coast-Haida Gwaii electoral district of the British Columbia Legislative Assembly. The riding is represented by New Democratic MLA Tamara Davidson since 2024.

=== Federal ===
Hagensborg lies within the Canadian Parliamentary riding of Skeena-Bulkley Valley, currently represented by Conservative MP Ellis Ross since 2025.

== Education ==
Hagensborg is home to the headquarters of School District 49 Central Coast, which administers three local schools (each of which is the only provincial school serving those grades in the Valley), Sir Alexander Mackenzie Secondary School (grades 8-12), Nusatsum Elementary School (grades 5-7), and Bella Coola Elementary School (grades K-4). The Bella Coola Elementary School is located outside of Hagensborg in the nearby community of Bella Coola. There is also a nearby Seventh-Day Adventist School as well as a First Nations school outside the community.

== Services and locations of note ==
Hagensborg is located centrally with regard to the population distribution of the Bella Coola Valley. As such, it provides some services, such as the airport, ambulance station, cemetery, post office, swimming pool (summer only), Royal Canadian Legion hall and some accommodation and retail that serve the entire Valley. In addition, it is the primary service centre for the eastern end of the Bella Coola Valley, and thus is home to a full-service grocery store, liquor store, gas station, bed and breakfast, tourism services, and other commercial services.

Hagensborg is home to the Norwegian Heritage House, a preserved house built prior to 1900 by Andrew Svisdahl, an early Norwegian settler in the area. The House has been outfitted as an interpretive centre.
