= Harrison =

Harrison or Harrissons may refer to:

== People ==
- Harrison (name), a given name and surname (including a list of people with the name)
- Harrison (Canadian musician)
- Harrison (English musician)
- Harrison family of Virginia, United States

== Places ==
=== Australia ===
- Harrison, Australian Capital Territory, suburb in the Canberra district of Gungahlin

=== Canada ===
- Inukjuak, Quebec, or "Port Harrison", Nunavik region of northern Quebec, Canada
- Harrison Lake, a lake in the Lower Mainland region of British Columbia, Canada
  - Harrison Hot Springs, resort village in British Columbia, Canada, located on Harrison Lake
  - Harrison River, a tributary of the Fraser River and which is the outlet of Harrison Lake
  - Harrison Bay (British Columbia), a side water of the river
  - Harrison Mills, British Columbia, a locality and former mill town at the mouth of the Harrison River
  - Harrison Knob, a prominent hill and important archaeological site adjacent to the mouth of the Harrison River
- Harrison Island (Nunavut), Hudson Bay, Nunavut
- Harrison Islands, Gulf of Boothia, Nunavut
- Harrison Settlement, Nova Scotia

=== Philippines ===
- Harrison Avenue, a main road in Pasay, Metro Manila
- Harrison Plaza, a shopping mall in the City of Manila

=== United States ===
- Harrison, Arkansas
- Harrison, Georgia
- Harrison, Idaho
- Harrison, Illinois (disambiguation)
- Harrison, Vigo County, Indiana
- Harrison, Maine
- Harrison, Michigan
- Harrison, Minneapolis, Minnesota
- Harrison, Montana
- Harrison, Nebraska
- Harrison, New Jersey
- Harrison, New York
- Harrison, Ohio
- Harrison, Roanoke, Virginia
- Harrison, South Dakota
- Harrison, Tennessee
- Harrison, Wisconsin (disambiguation)
- Harrisonburg, Louisiana
- Harrisonburg, Virginia

== Other uses ==
- Harrison (automobile), a 1900s American automobile company
- Harrisons (band), British band
- Harrisons F.C., defunct English football club

== See also ==
- Harison (disambiguation)
- Harrison station (disambiguation)
- Harrison Audio, maker of broadcast and recording audio equipment, DAWs, and cross-platform plugins.
- Harrison Apartment Building, listed on the National Register of Historic Places in Washington, D.C.
- Harrison College (Indiana) (formerly Indiana Business College)
- Harrison Narcotics Tax Act
- George Harrison (album)
- Harrison & Harrison organ builders
- Harrison and Sons postage stamp printers
- Harrison's Principles of Internal Medicine
- Harrison Bergeron, short story by Kurt Vonnegut
- Justice Harrison (disambiguation)
