= Kent, British Columbia =

Kent
- District municipality
- The Corporation of the District of Kent
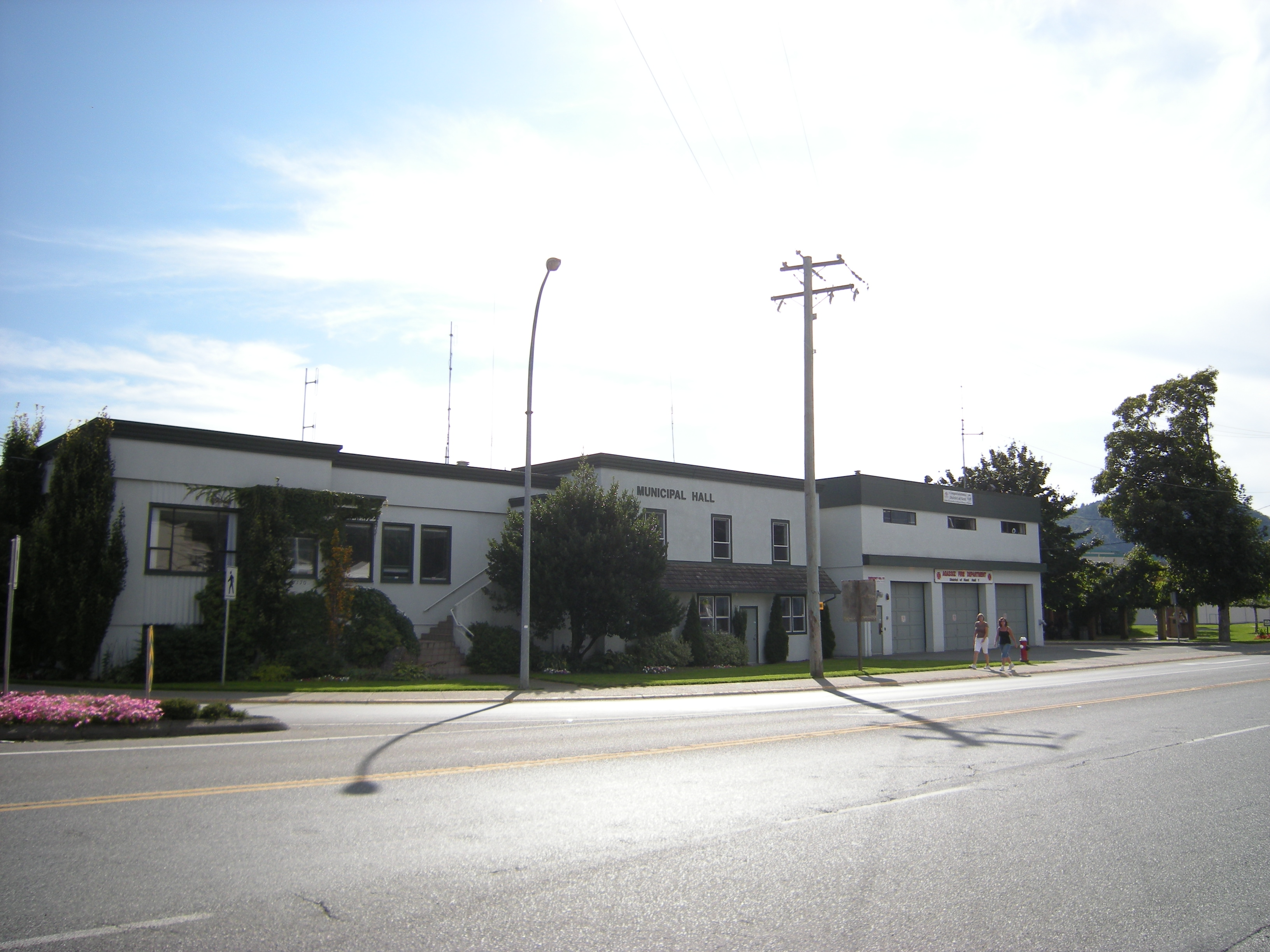
- Kent Municipal Hall

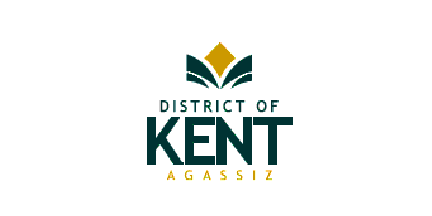
- Flag

- Location of Kent in British Columbia
- Coordinates: 49°17′0″N 121°45′0″W
- Country: Canada
- Province: British Columbia
- Regional district: Fraser Valley
- Incorporated: 1895

Government
  - Mayor: Sylvia Pranger

Area
  - Total: 168.39 km^{2} (65.02 sq mi)
- Elevation: 80 m (260 ft)

Population (2016)
  - Total: 6,067
  - Density: 35.9/km^{2} (93/sq mi)
- Time zone: UTC−07:00 (PT)
- Postal code span: V0M
- Area codes: 604, 778
- Website: www.kentbc.ca

The District of Kent is a district municipality located 116 kilometres (72 mi) east of Vancouver, British Columbia. Part of the Fraser Valley Regional District, Kent consists of several communities, the largest and most well-known being Agassiz—the only town in the municipality—Harrison Mills, Kilby, Mount Woodside, Kent Prairie, Sea Bird Island and Ruby Creek. Included within the municipality's boundaries are several separately-governed Indian reserves, including the Seabird Island First Nation's reserves on and around the island of the same name.

Kent's only incorporated municipal neighbours are Chilliwack, to the south across the Fraser, and Harrison Hot Springs which is an enclave on the north side of the municipality at the south end of Harrison Lake. Chehalis, to the west across the Harrison River from Harrison Mills, is unincorporated and largely an Indian reserve community of the Chehalis First Nation of the Sts'Ailes people.

== Neighbourhoods ==
Located north of Chilliwack and south of Harrison Hot Springs, Kent is made up of several communities. Agassiz is the district's commercial and industrial centre, and also the largest community. Harrison Mills in western Kent consists of mainly agricultural land and is home to the British Columbia Heritage Kilby Museum and Campground. Harrison Highlands (formerly known as Mount Woodside, which is still the name of the mountain Harrison Highlands is located on) is a residential resort development located in central-west Kent targeted towards residents from Vancouver. Ruby Creek to the northeast is a mixed rural-residential community. Rockwell Drive, at the eastern shore of Harrison Lake, serves as a residential and commercial resort-like community.

== Climate ==
Like the rest of southwestern British Columbia, Kent enjoys a wet but moderate to mild climate in the wintertime with drier summers, with very few major temperature fluctuations. The warmest months are usually July and August, with an average of 23 degrees Celsius (74 degrees Fahrenheit); its coldest month is normally January, averaging 2.5 °C (35 °F).

Climate data for Agassiz
Month	Jan	Feb	Mar	Apr	May	Jun	Jul	Aug	Sep	Oct	Nov	Dec	Year
Record high °C (°F)	17.2 (63.0)	21.7 (71.1)	25 (77)	32.2 (90.0)	36 (97)	36.7 (98.1)	38.3 (100.9)	39.4 (102.9)	35.6 (96.1)	28.3 (82.9)	21.1 (70.0)	17.2 (63.0)	39.4 (102.9)
Mean daily maximum °C (°F)	6.2 (43.2)	8.5 (47.3)	11.6 (52.9)	15 (59)	18.5 (65.3)	21.1 (70.0)	24 (75)	24.6 (76.3)	21.3 (70.3)	15 (59)	8.9 (48.0)	5.8 (42.4)	15 (59)
Daily mean °C (°F)	3.4 (38.1)	5.1 (41.2)	7.5 (45.5)	10.4 (50.7)	13.6 (56.5)	16.2 (61.2)	18.5 (65.3)	18.7 (65.7)	15.9 (60.6)	11 (52)	6.1 (43.0)	3.2 (37.8)	10.8 (51.4)
Mean daily minimum °C (°F)	0.5 (32.9)	1.6 (34.9)	3.4 (38.1)	5.6 (42.1)	8.8 (47.8)	11.3 (52.3)	12.8 (55.0)	12.8 (55.0)	10.3 (50.5)	6.9 (44.4)	3.2 (37.8)	0.5 (32.9)	6.5 (43.7)
Record low °C (°F)	−25 (−13)	−24.4 (−11.9)	−14.4 (6.1)	−3.9 (25.0)	−1.1 (30.0)	1.7 (35.1)	3.3 (37.9)	1.7 (35.1)	−1.1 (30.0)	−8.5 (16.7)	−19 (−2)	−21.1 (−6.0)	−25 (−13)
Average precipitation mm (inches)	240.8 (9.48)	142.1 (5.59)	154.7 (6.09)	125.9 (4.96)	103 (4.1)	92.3 (3.63)	66.6 (2.62)	58.2 (2.29)	87.6 (3.45)	191.7 (7.55)	285 (11.2)	206.1 (8.11)	1,754.1 (69.06)
Average rainfall mm (inches)	220.8 (8.69)	131.1 (5.16)	148.8 (5.86)	125.5 (4.94)	103 (4.1)	92.3 (3.63)	66.6 (2.62)	58.2 (2.29)	87.6 (3.45)	191.6 (7.54)	275.8 (10.86)	187.7 (7.39)	1,687 (66.4)
Average snowfall cm (inches)	20.3 (8.0)	12.5 (4.9)	5.8 (2.3)	0.4 (0.2)	0 (0)	0 (0)	0 (0)	0 (0)	0 (0)	0.2 (0.1)	9.2 (3.6)	19 (7.5)	67.4 (26.5)
Average precipitation days (≥ 0.2 mm)	20.9	16.9	20.5	18.8	18	15.4	10.5	9.8	12.2	18.7	22.3	19.5	203.6
Average rainy days (≥ 0.2 mm)	18.7	15.5	20.1	18.8	18	15.4	10.5	9.8	12.2	18.6	21.7	18	197.4
Average snowy days (≥ 0.2 cm)	4	2.4	1.1	0.2	0	0	0	0	0	0.1	1.5	3.6	12.9
Mean monthly sunshine hours	58.8	94.1	131.6	164.1	195.7	192.6	247.9	246.6	205.1	114.3	56.1	56.8	1,763.6
Percentage possible sunshine	21.8	32.9	35.8	39.9	41.3	39.7	50.7	55.2	54.1	34.1	20.4	22.1	37.3

== History ==
Kent's growth was initiated by the Fraser Canyon Gold Rush about fifty years later in 1858. Among the first European settlers to settle in Kent in the 1860s include T.B. Hicks and the Agassiz family. Shortly after, the first commercial activity in the area took place between the local First Nations people and the Hudson's Bay Company fur traders. Rapid commercial growth followed as boats started to routinely stop in the area en route to the Fraser Canyon.

The construction of the Canadian Pacific Railway around 1881 introduced more development along areas in Kent near the Fraser River and Harrison River. In 1895, the District of Kent was incorporated, taking the name of the English county where hops were also an important crop. Shortly after the incorporation, the Canadian Pacific Railway opened, bringing along more commercial activity to the area.

While the traditional economic merchandise in the area are agriculture-related, there has been a diversification since the 1900s. Roads started to be built between 1901 and 1940, becoming one of the major sources of employment. A bridge crossing at the Harrison River opened in 1926, creating the first-ever road connection to the west of Kent. This connection is often credited for making Agassiz a market-friendly agricultural centre.

In 1948, the Fraser River Flood struck and wiped out Kent's hop industry. However, this disaster unexpectedly benefited Kent as corn became the new primary agricultural product of the region, leading to Agassiz's claim as the "Corn Capital of BC"; this claim is still used today.

Mountain Institution, formerly known as Agassiz Mountain Prison, which was torn down on the same site, is a federal maximum-security prison at the western end of Kent Prairie, just north of the foot of what is known as Agassiz Mountain, the mountainside grade of BC Highway 7 which rises over the south side of Mount Woodside and descends into Harrison Mills to the Harrison River Bridge. It was constructed in the 1960s to house 400 Sons of Freedom in the wake of their arrest for various bombings in the Kootenay region and became the site of a large temporary tenement camp of their followers and supporters.

A research farm run by the federal government Department of Agriculture is located to the northwest of the town of Agassiz, and was formerly a private estate.

== Demographics ==
In the 2021 Census of Population conducted by Statistics Canada, Kent had a population of 6,300 living in 2,351 of its 2,518 total private dwellings, a change of 3.8% from its 2016 population of 6,067. With a land area of 168.59 km^{2} (65.09 sq mi), it had a population density of 37.4/km^{2} (96.8/sq mi) in 2021.

The majority of Kent's residents live in Agassiz. It is the fifth most populated municipality in the Fraser Valley Regional District, after Abbotsford (115,711), Chilliwack (64,898), Mission (31,272) and Hope (6,313). Only one incorporated municipality, Harrison Hot Springs, has fewer residents (1,343).

=== Ethnicity ===
Panethnic groups in the District of Kent (1996−2021)
Panethnic group	2021		2016		2011		2006		2001		1996	
Panethnic group	Pop.	%	Pop.	%	Pop.	%	Pop.	%	Pop.	%	Pop.	%
European (Note: Statistic includes all persons that did not make up part of a visible minority or an indigenous identity.)	4,720	84.51%	4,540	87.06%	4,255	88.19%	4,245	90.71%	4,105	94.26%	3,990	94.1%
Indigenous	420	7.52%	385	7.38%	370	7.67%	295	6.3%	130	2.99%	125	2.95%
Southeast Asian (Note: Statistic includes total responses of "Filipino" and "Southeast Asian" under visible minority section on census.)	180	3.22%	60	1.15%	0	0%	55	1.18%	30	0.69%	45	1.06%
South Asian	80	1.43%	45	0.86%	15	0.31%	0	0%	0	0%	45	1.06%
East Asian (Note: Statistic includes total responses of "Chinese", "Korean", and "Japanese" under visible minority section on census.)	55	0.98%	75	1.44%	120	2.49%	35	0.75%	55	1.26%	25	0.59%
Latin American	50	0.9%	60	1.15%	0	0%	10	0.21%	15	0.34%	0	0%
African	30	0.54%	10	0.19%	45	0.93%	20	0.43%	20	0.46%	10	0.24%
Middle Eastern (Note: Statistic includes total responses of "West Asian" and "Arab" under visible minority section on census.)	20	0.36%	25	0.48%	0	0%	10	0.21%	0	0%	0	0%
Other/multiracial (Note: Statistic includes total responses of "Visible minority, n.i.e." and "Multiple visible minorities" under visible minority section on census.)	10	0.18%	15	0.29%	0	0%	10	0.21%	10	0.23%	0	0%
Total responses	5,585	88.65%	5,215	85.96%	4,825	85.19%	4,680	98.78%	4,355	88.41%	4,240	87.53%
Total population	6,300	100%	6,067	100%	5,664	100%	4,738	100%	4,926	100%	4,844	100%
Note: Totals greater than 100% due to multiple origin responses.

=== Religion ===
According to the 2021 census, religious groups in Kent included:

- Christianity (2,810 persons or 50.3%)
- Irreligion (2,595 persons or 46.5%)
- Sikhism (50 persons or 0.9%)
- Islam (30 persons or 0.5%)
- Buddhism (20 persons or 0.4%)
- Hinduism (10 persons or 0.2%)
- Other (65 persons or 1.2%)

== Government and politics ==
In federal elections, Kent is part of the Chilliwack—Fraser Canyon riding, which has existed since 2004. The riding's current Member of Parliament is Mark Strahl, a member of the ruling Conservative Party of Canada.

In provincial elections, Kent lies within the Chilliwack-Kent riding. The current Member of the Legislative Assembly is Tony Luck of the BC Conservative Party.

The current mayor of Kent is Sylvia Pranger.

== Transportation ==
Several highways run through Kent. Highway 7 (also known as the Lougheed Highway) runs the entire length of the district, connecting Kent to much of the Fraser Valley and Greater Vancouver. Highway 9 connects Highway 7 to the Trans Canada Highway.

Agassiz-Harrison Transit operates a single bus route (No.11) from the Chilliwack downtown exchange to Rosedale, Popkum, Agassiz and Harrison Hot Springs

== Economy ==
Kent's economy has traditionally relied on agriculture. However, it has diversified in recent years by ways of tourism and recreation. Nearby Harrison Hot Springs is a big tourist draw for the area, and many adventurers take advantage of the lakes and rivers in and around Kent.

A major employer of the region is the Correctional Service of Canada. Both Mountain Institution (medium security) and Kent Institution (maximum security) are located within the district.

Agassiz bills itself as the 'Corn Capital of BC'.

== Education ==
Kent is served by School District 78 Fraser-Cascade. Its schools within Kent include Agassiz Elementary Secondary School, Kent Elementary School, McCaffrey Alternative School, and the Agassiz Continuing Education Centre provides education for adults.

There is also a private K-7 school, Agassiz Christian School.

== Sports and recreation ==
While Kent has no big sports teams, it is a hub for recreational activity due to its proximity to major rivers and lakes; Harrison Lake and Harrison River is often used for water sports. Sasquatch Provincial Park in northern Kent, next to Harrison Lake, provides camping areas and offers hiking and fishing opportunities.

== See also ==
- Chilliwack
- Harrison Hot Springs, British Columbia
- Harrison Mills, British Columbia
- Chehalis, British Columbia
