= Lake Errock =

- Location of Lake Errock in British Columbia
- Coordinates: 49°12′59″N 122°01′04″W
- Country: Canada
- Province: British Columbia
- Region: Fraser Valley
- Regional district: Fraser Valley

Area
  - Total: 8.65 km^{2} (3.34 sq mi)

Population (2021)
  - Total: 343
  - Density: 39.7/km^{2} (103/sq mi)
- Time zone: UTC−07:00 (PT)
- Postal code: V0M 1N0
- Area codes: 604, 778, 236, & 672
- Highways: Highway 7

Lake Errock is an unincorporated community in the Fraser Valley region of southwestern British Columbia. Housing exists primarily on the northwestern shore of the same named lake, which lies southwest of Harrison Bay. The locality, on BC Highway 7, is by road about 23 kilometres (14 mi) west of Agassiz, 95 kilometres (59 mi) east of Vancouver, and 28 kilometres (17 mi) east of Mission.

== First Nations ==
Archaeologically, Lake Errock is the most westerly of the sizable pit-house villages. First Nations reserves lie to the north and south.

== Name origin ==
The name of Squakum Lake was officially adopted for the lake in 1924, but appeared as Erroch on earlier documentation. The railway siding was called Squakum. In 1940, the designation of the post office as Lake Errock established the community name. In 1974, the lake was likewise officially renamed.

== European settlement ==
In the late 1880s, Felix Parent was the initial pioneer settler, acquiring an acreage now fronted by the gas station. In the early 1890s, the Ross Ranch, which encompassed the lake, was described as the largest fruit ranch in the lower Province. Arthur Wellington Ross is believed to have headed the syndicate that owned the property. The venture failed and the orchard was abandoned.

The Squakum Ranch, at the end of present Malcolm Rd, was a smaller commercial orchard on the banks of the Fraser River. Alex Malcolm bought the property in 1892. In that era, sternwheelers collected milk and cream at the landing.

Tom Wilson was the inaugural postmaster 1892–1895. Wilson, the Ross Ranch manager, operated the post office from his home. When the ranch ceased to be viable, the post office also closed that yearend.

After World War I, a number of veterans took up small ranches, but most moved on. In the early 1920s, Charles and Miriam Bell, who arrived and farmed the Parent property, were among the few families who remained as permanent residents during the 1930s. In 1937, Alex Malcolm sold his property to the Kilbergs. In 1951, his cremated ashes were scattered upon the Fraser.

Census population: Lake Errock
Year	Pop.	±%
1951	107	—
1956	96	−10.3%
1961	75	−21.9%
1966	144	+92.0%
1971	65	−54.9%
1976	177	+172.3%
1981		—
1986	255	—
1991	257	+0.8%
1996		—
2001		—
2006	426	—
2011*	359	−15.7%
2016	425	+18.4%
2021	343	−19.3%
Source: Statistics Canada * Revised figure

G. Robert (Bob) Webster established a general store around 1939 and became postmaster when the post office reopened in 1940. The store property was on the west side of the highway at the south end of the lake. While postmaster 1947–1959, Evelyn Dvorack managed the store, gas pumps, and tourist cabins they had built.

In the 1960s, Lake Errock became a predominantly residential area of vacation properties when subdivisions were created.

On the north corner of Watkins Rd, the one-room elementary school existed 1957–1982. On the south corner, the church erected in 1961, which affiliated with the Mennonite Brethren in 1964, became a satellite congregation of the Central Community Church in Chilliwack in 2017.

In 1982, the fire hall opened behind the church.

== Roads ==
Eastward, the Harrison River was bridged in 1926, opening up the road to Harrison Hot Springs. In 1931, Great Depression relief camps were set up on Skumalasph Island and on the north side of Malcolm Rd. While upgrading the road westward, labour unrest and low productivity were common, before the camps closed in 1936. Transportation developments farther westward align with those of Deroche.

== Later community ==
In 2009, an eastbound train fatally struck a man standing on the track.

The infrastructure includes a gas station/convenience store and a volunteer fire hall. A campground lies to the northeast. The post office is at Harrison Bay.

In 2021, a proposal was submitted for a new development on a former gravel pit. The Sq’ewlets First Nation, which has experienced problems with sewage disposal, might also benefit from the proposed wastewater treatment plant. Residents opposed to increased development near the water, regard the neighbourhood as a small bedroom community.
