= Chehalis Lake =

Lake in British Columbia, Canada

- Location within British Columbia Location within Canada
- Location: British Columbia
- Coordinates: 49°27′00″N 122°01′00″W
- Primary inflows: Chehalis River
- Primary outflows: Chehalis River
- Basin countries: Canada

Chehalis Lake is a lake on the Chehalis River in the Lower Mainland of southwestern British Columbia, Canada. It lies in the Chehalis Valley 80 kilometres (50 mi) east of Vancouver.

== Name ==
Chehalis Lake and the Chehalis River — which the lake feeds to its south — share the name with the community of Chehalis, British Columbia, which is the home of the Sts'Ailes people, a Halqemeylem-speaking Coast Salish group. The name Sts'Ailes is said to mean "beating heart." (The similarly named Chehalis, Washington, and Chehalis River in the United States are named for a word in the Chehalis language with a different meaning: "sand.")

== Recreation ==
During the summer, Chehalis Lake is a popular location for camping, recreational fishing, and hiking.

== History ==
=== Formation ===
Chehalis Lake is a glacial-trough lake formed in the Pleistocene by the advance and subsequent retreat of the Cordilleran Ice Sheet.

=== 2007 landslide and megatsunami ===
On December 4, 2007, a rockslide with a volume of 3,000,000 cubic metres (3,900,000 cu yd) slid down the side of 1,563-metre (5,128 ft) high Mount Orrock on an east-facing slope. The slide began at an altitude of about 550 metres (1,800 ft) as a mass of quartz diorite and traveled for 800 metres (2,600 ft) down the slope, disintegrating into a debris avalanche and reaching a speed of 216 kilometres per hour (134 mph). It destroyed a 400-metre (440 yd) section of a forest service road and about 25 hectares (62 acres) of commercially marketable timber.

The slide reached the western shore of Chehalis Lake, depositing a large amount of material in a 175-metre (574 ft) deep portion of the lake. This generated a megatsunami with a run-up height of 37.8 metres (124 ft) on the opposite shore, 0.8 kilometres (0.5 mi) away. The wave was 6.3 metres (21 ft) tall at the lake's exit point, 7.5 kilometres (4.7 mi) away to the south. The wave then continued down the Chehalis River for about 15 kilometres (9.3 mi). Along the lakeshore, the wave stripped vegetation to heights of as high as several tens of metres, caused significant erosion of sediments, and severely damaged three deserted campgrounds. The event occurred during the winter when cold weather deters visits to the lake, so there were no eyewitnesses to it or deaths or injuries resulting from it.

The cause of the landslide is not clear. Heavy snow and rain in the area prior to the slide may have been at least a contributing factor.

One model suggests that the slide deposited perhaps 1,000,000 cubic metres (1,300,000 cu yd) of material in the lake, and that if the entire 3,000,000 cubic metres (3,900,000 cu yd) had entered the lake the megatsunami's maximum run-up height would have been 62 metres (203 ft).
