= Harrison Hill =

Small mountain in the Lower Mainland of BC

Coordinates: 49°13′26″N 121°57′26″W

Harrison Hill (622m) is a small mountain located at the confluence of the Harrison and Fraser Rivers in the Lower Mainland region of British Columbia, Canada. Harrison Knob (~225m) is a prominent shoulder to the east of the main peak of Harrison Hill. Harrison Hill and Harrison Knob are on the north side of the Fraser opposite Chilliwack, Harrison Knob overlooks the confluence directly, Harrison Hill itself separates the Fraser downstream from that confluence and overlooks on its north Harrison Bay, a large, shallow lake-like sidewater of the Harrison River, while at its western foot is the community of Lake Errock. At its eastern foot, just below Harrison Knob, had been the formerly large sawmill town of Harrison Mills, which spanned both sides of the Harrison and was served by the mainline of the Canadian Pacific Railway, which runs along the north side of the mountain's base. The Indian Reserves of the Scowlitz First Nation are at the western end of Harrison Bay and at its outlet at its eastern end, while the reserve of the Chehalis First Nation is along its north shore, and Kilby is on its east shore.

== Archaeological site ==
Harrison Knob and Harrison Hill are important in regional archaeology as the site of a number of surviving Coast Salish mound or "pyramid" cemeteries. Built of earth and stone and called the Scowlitz Mounds, also the Fraser Valley Pyramids, the structures date from 1000 to 1500 BP. In the Halkomelem language, Harrison Knob is called Qithyll. There are 198 mounds in 15 distinct clusters over an area comprising 10 km^{2}.
