= Lake Errock (British Columbia) =

Lake in British Columbia, Canada

- Location within British Columbia
- Location: Upper Fraser Valley, British Columbia
- Coordinates: 49°13′36″N 122°00′41″W
- Basin countries: Canada
- Settlements: Lake Errock

Lake Errock is a lake at the community of the same name, located between Chehalis and Deroche in the Upper Fraser Valley of the Lower Mainland region of British Columbia, Canada. It lies southwest of Harrison Bay, a sidewater of the Harrison River west of Chehalis, and is separated from the nearby Fraser River by a large rocky hill. Originally named Squakum Lake, the name was adapted to that of the Lake Errock Post Office in 1964.

== See also ==
- List of lakes of British Columbia
