= Sasquatch Mountain Resort =

Ski resort in British Columbia, Canada

Coordinates: 49°22′37″N 121°56′06″W

Sasquatch Mountain Resort is a small ski resort in the Douglas Ranges approximately 22.5 km (15 mi) north of Harrison Mills. Located in Hemlock Valley.

Previously known as Hemlock Valley Resort, the resort closed due to bankruptcy receivership in 2005. In 2006, the resort was purchased by Berezan Hospitality Group and reopened in December 2006. Shortly thereafter, the resort started negotiations with local First Nations and the province of BC for a substantial expansion that would see the resort become the largest resort facility in the Lower Mainland of BC.

The resort proposal includes ski area expansion to 18 lift-serviced areas, 2 golf courses, a marina on Harrison Lake, and associated residential and commercial development. The plan was in the final stages of approval, and a formal agreement was expected to be announced in 2014. The resort did not open in the 2014/2015 season, due to a lack of snow.

The average annual snowfall at Hemlock Valley is 30–35 ft. The vertical drop is 335 m (1,099 ft) from a summit elevation of 1,317 m (4,321 ft) to a base elevation of 980 m (3,220 ft). The area comprises 121 hectares (300 acres) and has 34 runs, the longest of which is 1.4 miles (2.3 km). The area has four lifts: one quad chair, one triple chair, one double chair, and a beginner magic carpet. It also features night skiing and 13 kilometres of cross-country skiing trails, as well as an 8-lane tubing and tobogganing area with a magic carpet.

== History ==
Hemlock Valley was first opened for skiing on December 21, 1969, by a company known then as Hemlock Valley Recreation (HVR). The facilities were initially very basic, with just a single rope-tow lift and an older school bus fitted with a wood-burning stove to serve as the ski lodge. Some 30-40 families visited the ski hill that first season.

Over the 1970s, a lodge was built and three chair lifts were added, with the third lift completed in 1978. A resort community of 225 lots was developed.

Due to the recession of the early 1980s, the resort encountered financial difficulties, and ownership was transferred to the provincial government via the British Columbia Development Corporation. A new company then acquired the ski hill, operating under the name Hemlock Valley Resorts Inc. (HVRI).

In 2004–05 there was not enough snow for the resort to open.

The resort remained closed for the 2005–06 season due to being in receivership.

In fall 2006, the resort was purchased by Berezan Group, a company based in Langley, BC. Hemlock Valley reopened for the 2006–07 season as Hemlock Resort.

The 2013–14 season opened late, on January 16, because of a lack of snow.

The 2014–15 ski season was cancelled entirely due to a lack of snow.

In 2015, the BC government authorized Hemlock Resort's $1.5 billion all-season expansion.
