= Harrison Bay (British Columbia) =

Bay in British Columbia, Canada

Coordinates: 49°14′00″N 121°59′00″W

Harrison Bay is a lake-like expansion of the Harrison River, located west of its main course adjacent to the communities of Chehalis and Harrison Mills in the Canadian province of British Columbia. Extremely shallow, the bay outlets to the Fraser at Harrison Mills, where in pre-gold rush times there had been a "riffle", which was dredged to enable easier steamer traffic to Harrison Lake and Port Douglas. The bay has been used as a log sort but is primarily recreational in use today, with the Scowlitz Indian Band running a beach and campground at its western end, on Squawkum Creek Indian Reserve No. 3, which is at the southwest corner of Harrison Bay. Between it and the Fraser lies Harrison Hill, known in Upriver Halkomelem as Qithyll, which is an ancient burial ground currently under investigation by the First Nation in a joint effort with Simon Fraser University's archaeology department.. Adjacent to Kilby Provincial Park and the site of Harrison Mills are Williams Indian Reserve No. 2 and Scowlitz Indian Reserve No. 1
