= Chehalis River (British Columbia) =

Location
- Country: Canada
- Province: British Columbia
- District: New Westminster Land District

Physical characteristics
- Source: Douglas Ranges
  - location: Coast Mountains
- Mouth: Fraser River
  - location: Harrison Mills, Upper Fraser Valley/Lower Mainland
  - coordinates: 49°16′11″N 121°56′9″W
  - elevation: 10 m (33 ft)
- Basin size: 383 km^{2} (148 sq mi)
- Discharge
  - location: mouth
  - average: 39.1 m^{3}/s (1,380 cu ft/s)
  - minimum: 2.04 m^{3}/s (72 cu ft/s)
  - maximum: 660 m^{3}/s (23,000 cu ft/s)

The Chehalis River (/ʃəˈheɪlɪs/ shə-HAY-liss) is located in the southwest corner of British Columbia, Canada near the city of Chilliwack. It flows south-eastward out of the Douglas Ranges of the Coast Mountains, draining into the Harrison River.

Though the river's valley is heavily logged—earlier in the 20th century the area was covered by a dense network of logging railways—the river itself flows through a small canyon before a short relatively flat stretch leading to its confluence with the Harrison. The Chehalis is a fishing stream and, together with its tributaries such as Statlu Creek, offers opportunities for class III and IV whitewater kayaking.

The Chehalis River starts in the mountains above and just west of Statlu Lake, which it soon flows into. Shortly after exiting the lake, it drops over impressive Statlu Falls, which is difficult to view without putting yourself in real danger. People have died when they have slipped and fallen over the falls. After the falls, the river turns south, eventually flowing into Chehalis Lake. After it exits the lake it continues its journey south to the Harrison River.

The river's canyon and the peaks and cliff-faces of the range encircling its basin, which comprises most of the area of the Douglas Ranges, is popular with rock-climbers and hikers, who call the area "the Chehalis". There is a small ski resort, Hemlock Valley, on the eastern side of the Chehalis River basin.

A road penetrates the northeast rim of the range into the Harrison Lake basin and on to historic Port Douglas, at the head of that lake, and beyond up the Lillooet River via Skookumchuck Hot Springs to Pemberton–Mount Currie. This road, to be named the Sasquatch Highway was proposed to be paved before the 2010 Winter Olympics to connect Hwy 7 (Lougheed Highway) at the community of Chehalis with Hwy 99 (the Sea-to-Sky Highway) at Mount Currie.

On December 4, 2007, a large landslide entered Chehalis Lake and triggered a megatsunami with a maximum run-up height of 37.8 metres (124 ft) along the lakeshore. The wave was 6.3 metres (21 ft) tall when it reached the lake's exit point, 7.5 kilometres (4.7 mi) south of the landslide and continued down the Chehalis River for about 15 kilometres (9.3 mi).

== See also ==
- List of tributaries of the Fraser River
- List of rivers of British Columbia
