= Harrison Island =

Harrison Island may refer to:

== Canada ==
- Harrison Island (British Columbia), a small island in Esquimalt in Juan de Fuca Strait between Macaulay Point and McLoughlin Point
- Harrison Island (Manitoba), a small island in Sasaginnigak Lake northwest of Atikaki Provincial Wilderness Park in eastern Manitoba
- Harrison Island (New Brunswick), a small island in French Lake northeast of Lower Burton
- Harrison Island (Northwest Territories), a small island between the Middle Channel and East Channel of the Mackenzie River north of Inuvik
- Harrison Island (Nunavut), a small island in eastern Hudson Bay near Quebec
- Harrison Island (Oliver Lake, Saskatchewan), a small island in Oliver Lake in northeastern Saskatchewan
- Harrison Island (Torwalt Lake, Saskatchewan), a small island near Torwalt Lake east of Wollaston Lake in northeastern Saskatchewan

== United States ==
- Harrison Island (Maryland), a small island in the Potomac River near Leesburg, Virginia
