= President Harris =

President Harris may refer to:

- Lagumot Harris (1938–1999), 3rd president of Nauru
- René Harris (1947–2008), 8th president of Nauru
- Baxter Harris, fictional president of the United States in the films Scary Movie 3 and Scary Movie 4, portrayed by Leslie Nielsen

== See also ==
- President Harrison (disambiguation)
