= School District 78 Fraser-Cascade =

School district in British Columbia, Canada

Location
- Hope Hope, Agassiz, Harrison, Boston Bar in Fraser Valley Canada

District information
- Superintendent: Balan Moorthy
- Schools: 10
- Budget: CA$18.1 million

Students and staff
- Students: 2223

Other information
- Website: www.sd78.bc.ca

School District 78 Fraser-Cascade is a school district in the eastern Fraser Valley of British Columbia. It includes Harrison Hot Springs, the District of Kent, including Agassiz, and extends up the Fraser River from there to the town of Hope and up the southern section of the Fraser Canyon along Highway 1 to the communities of Yale and Boston Bar.

== History ==
School district 78 was formed in 1996 by the merging of School District No. 32 (Hope) and School District No. 76 (Agassiz-Harrison).

== Schools ==
School	Location	Grades
Agassiz Centre for Education (alt.)	Agassiz	8-12
Agassiz Elem-Secondary School	Agassiz	7-12
Boston Bar Elem-Secondary School	Boston Bar	K-12
C E Barry Intermediate School	Hope	n/a
Coquihalla Elementary School	Hope	K-4
Fraser-Cascade Mountain School	Hope	n/a
Harrison Hot Springs Elementary School	Harrison Hot Springs	K-6
Hope Secondary School	Hope	8-12
Kent Elementary School	Agassiz	K-6
Silver Creek Elementary School	Hope	K-7
Two Rivers Education Centre	Hope	9-12
Yale Elementary School	Yale	n/a

== See also ==
- List of school districts in British Columbia
