= Douglas Ranges =

Subrange of mountains in British Columbia, Canada

Douglas Range
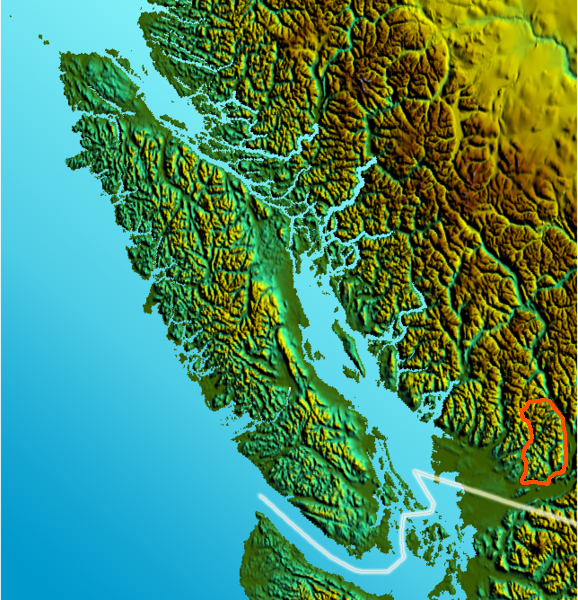
- Location map of the Douglas Range

Highest point
- Peak: Mount Robertson
- Elevation: 2,252 m (7,388 ft)

Dimensions
- Area: 4,900 km^{2} (1,900 mi^{2})

Geography
- Country: Canada
- Province: British Columbia
- Parent range: Pacific Ranges

The Douglas Ranges are a subrange of the Pacific Ranges of the Coast Mountains of the Canadian province of British Columbia, about 70 km (43 mi) east of downtown Vancouver, north of the Fraser River and between the valleys of Stave and Harrison Lakes. They are approximately 4,900 km^{2} (1,900 sq mi) in area. Their highest peak is Mount Robertson 2,252 m (7,388 ft), at the northwest limit of the range.

== Geography ==
The Douglas Ranges among the smallest and lowest of the major named subranges Coast Mountains, but in addition to being smallest and lowest they are also the southernmost part of the Coast Mountains and therefore also of the Pacific Ranges. The only thing more southerly than the Douglas Ranges, other than floodplain, is the unnamed hill-country that is most of Districts of Mission and part of Maple Ridge, from the Alouette River east across the upland to Hatzic Prairie. And in addition to being the most southerly and relatively lower than the rest of the Pacific Ranges, it is also among the wettest and, for being lowland country relative to the rest of its parent ranges, among the ruggedest.

The southern abutment of the Douglas Ranges is over 1,500 m (5,000 ft) above the Fraser River between Dewdney and the Harrison River, which flows along the southeast flank of the range.

East of the Douglas Ranges, across Harrison Lake, are the Lillooet Ranges, while to the west and northwest are the Garibaldi Ranges. Southeast across the Fraser River is the Canadian portion of the Cascade Range.

== History ==
Because of the warmer climate (relative to the rest, even, of the British Columbia coastal lowlands), there were forests of immense trees throughout the Douglas Ranges, which were logged relatively early on in British Columbia's history. A network of logging railroads ran throughout the basin of the Chehalis River, which drains the core of the ranges to the southeast, meeting the Harrison River just south of Chehalis, British Columbia. In other areas east of Stave Lake and along the side of Harrison Lake, grades required roads instead of rail.

Timber from the Douglas Ranges supplied mills around Harrison Bay and along the Fraser's waterfront from there to Ruskin and Whonnock, British Columbia. Douglas Ranges wood especially went to mills at Mission City, which was the capital of cedar shake production in the world for many years. Nearby Eddy Match Co., between Mission and Hatzic, was one of the two largest matchstick-making plant in the world; its only rival was in Hull, Quebec.

The Douglas Ranges are subjected to torrential and ongoing rain, and its valleys are deep and narrow and dank throughout the year. Given that environment, no wonder it is the highest-rated region for sasquatch sightings in the world, and the very word comes from the Chehalis people on its southeastern rim.

The ridges and cliffs above the dark, steep valleys (mostly clearcut) are favourites of rock climbers and have supposedly some of the finest rock in the province; their name for the area is "The Chehalis".

The name Douglas Ranges dates to the gold rush of 1857-1860, which used the Harrison River and Harrison Lake as part of a route to the Interior, the Douglas Road. They are not named directly for the colonial Governor, Sir James Douglas, but for the port and road that bore his name.
