= Mountain Institution =

Prison in British Columbia, Canada

Coordinates: 49°15′50″N 121°50′05″W

Mountain Institution is a medium security federal penitentiary operated by the Correctional Service of Canada (CSC). It is located in the town of Agassiz, District of Kent, British Columbia, approximately 115 kilometres east of Vancouver, British Columbia.

== History ==
Mountain Institution was opened in 1962 as a special provincial prison for Sons of Freedom. Its construction, to discourage traditional burning of buildings that characterized their method of protest, consisted of all metal living units. In 1969 it became a federal prison for offenders and inmates requiring protective custody. This is no longer the case as the only federal prison in BC that has a specialized protective custody section is Kent Institution. The remaining facilities are integrated.

In 1999 the CSC undertook an extensive rebuilding of the site. It was enlarged and the old living units, which were basically of partitioned dormitory style, were torn down and replaced with three modern 60-unit buildings. Also replaced were the dining hall/kitchen, school, health-care and other institutional facilities.

Mountain Institution has a rated capacity of 480 inmates and, as of 2012, had an inmate count of 391. There are additionally 16 beds in segregation. It offers several rehabilitation programs for offenders including violence prevention, sex offender and substance abuse programming.

In November 2010, Jeremy Phillips (33) was murdered by his cellmate, serial killer Michael Wayne McGray. Inmate McGray pleaded guilty to the crime a year later. This was his seventh murder conviction though he boasted of 10 others.

== March 29, 2008 riot ==
On the night of March 29, 2008, a riot broke out that caused the deaths of two inmates and left eleven inmates hospitalized. The hospitalized inmates had overdosed on methadone that they stole after breaking into the prison's Health Care. Convicted child pornographer, Michael Andrew Gibbon (39) was beaten to death (with baseball bats) in his cell while a second inmate, Trevor Wayne O'Brien (25), died of a drug overdose (200 ml of 175 mg methadone, first time he'd tried it) later in hospital. This is not the first time an inmate convicted of sexual offenses involving children has died in this prison facility. The last death involved James Patrick Jones, (55), a man convicted of sex offences involving children was found dead in his cell by Correctional Officers on March 17, 2007.

The riot was initiated by inmates in response to what was deemed extreme measures taken to curtail the drug trade within the prison. Inmates were disgruntled that the new warden, Alex Lubimiv, had restricted visiting privileges. The number of visitors was limited to 50 at a time, reduced from 250 due to staff shortages. The riot was not planned as a riot to begin with, however the inmates decided there was no room for further discussion with the warden.

Most inmates involved the riot did not want to participate, yet still did. 30 inmates remained peaceful, where 10 or so inmates continued to revolt. Many inmates would not return to their living units and were subsequently charged for participating in the riot.

Michael Gibbon was killed primarily because he was a sex offender.

The new acting Warden S. Huish has made considerable effort to improve the overall function of the institution as a whole. All correctional programs provided are now under the ICPM model (Integrated Correctional Program Model),
