= Sasquatch Provincial Park =

Provincial park in British Columbia

- IUCN category II (national park)
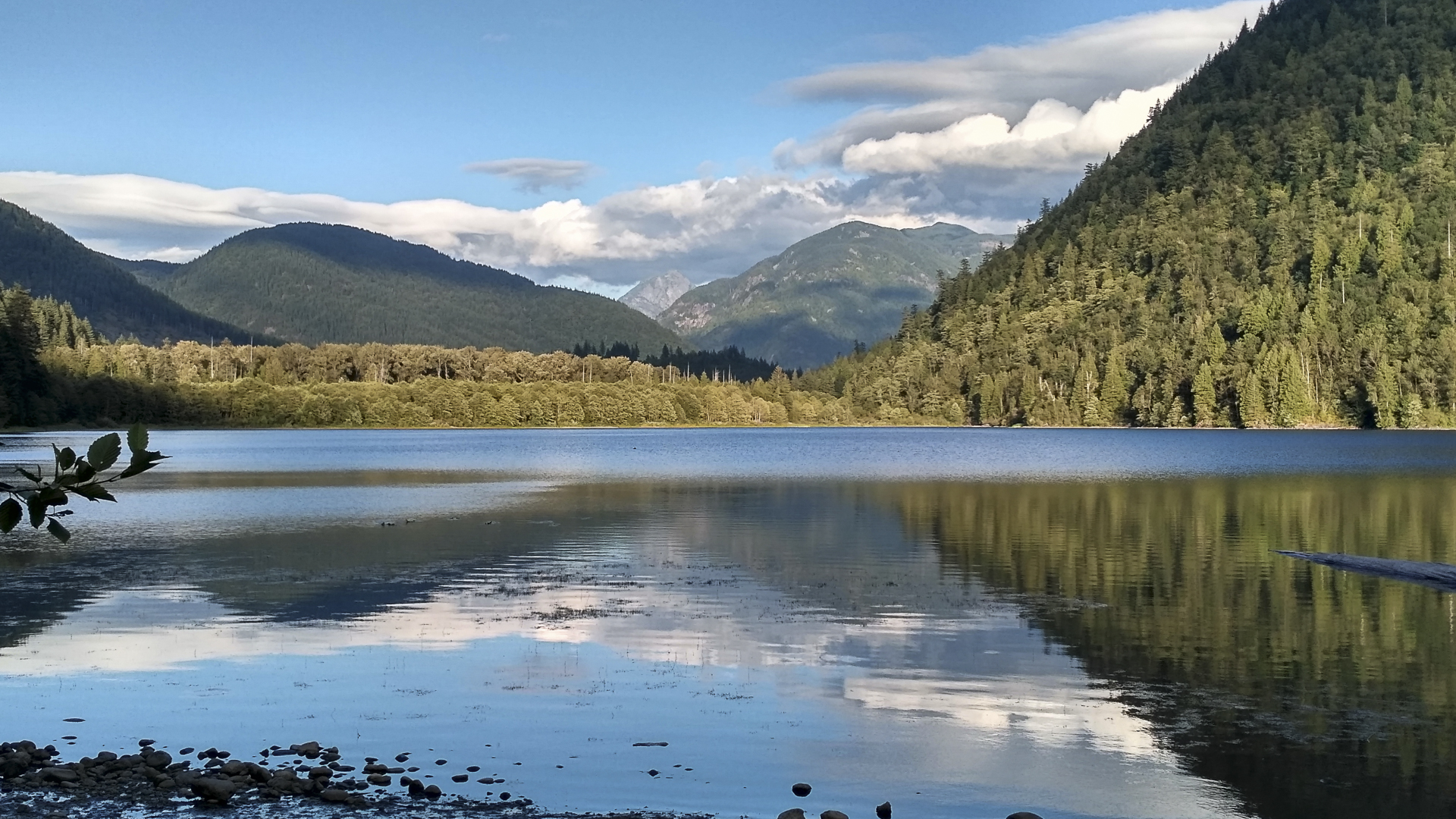
- Deer Lake

- Location within British Columbia Location within Fraser Valley Regional District
- Interactive map of Sasquatch Provincial Park
- Location: Kent, British Columbia, Canada
- Coordinates: 49°21′00″N 121°42′00″W
- Area: 1,217 ha (4.70 sq mi)
- Established: May 2, 1968
- Governing body: BC Parks

Sasquatch Provincial Park is a provincial park in Kent, British Columbia, Canada.

== History ==
The park was established 1968, in its present condition. It actually began in 1959 as a 20 hectare inland fjord called Green Point Park, which was expanded into a picnicking area in 1960. Eight years later the park was expanded greatly and renamed. It was named after Sasquatch (a Halkomelem Salish word), the cryptid said to be endemic to the area.

== Geography ==
The park is 1217 hectares in size. It is characterized by a series of pocket lakes, a unique second-growth and birch forest, and scenic mountain ridges.

The park is located in the District of Kent, 6 kilometres north of Harrison Hot Springs, British Columbia.

== Conservation ==
- Wildlife: tailed frogs, beavers, mountain goats, bears, deer, elk, northern rubber boa, and northern alligator lizard.
- Fish: sturgeon, smelt, rainbow trout, cutthroat trout, brook char, salmon, catfish, and stickleback
- Birds: bald eagles, woodpeckers, warblers, Ruffed Grouse, barred owl, and vireos
- Insect: black petaltail dragonfly

== Recreation ==
The following recreational activities are available: vehicle accessible camping, picnicking, hiking, interpretive walks, swimming, canoeing, kayaking, motorised boating, fishing, windsurfing, and waterskiing.

== See also ==
- List of British Columbia Provincial Parks
- List of Canadian provincial parks
