= Charles Fenn Pretty =

- Born: 1865; Belleville, Canada West
- Died: 1940 (aged 74–75); Harrison Mills, British Columbia, Canada

Charles Fenn Pretty (1865–1940) was the father of the forestry industry in British Columbia.

== Early years ==
Charles Fenn Pretty was born in 1865 in Canada West. Charles was brought up on the family farm at Belleville. In his early twenties, he entered the contracting business. He quickly made money off of the demolition of the old jail at Stratford by selling its timbers at a profit. However, he lost everything after building several hundred houses in Sault Ste. Marie for a contractor who went broke and couldn't pay.

In 1890, he moved to New Westminster with 17 cents in his pocket and, according to tradition, booked a room in the best hotel straightaway. He got wind of a poorly organised housing project with an impossible deadline, took it over and immediately set about rounding up all available labour from local bars. He finished with one day to spare and to a satisfactory standard. With the proceeds from this development, he opened a fish cannery but was faced with strong opposition. To solve this problem, Pretty bought the entire supply of ice in New Westminster. By 1892 he had bought out all his competitors and incorporated C.F. Pretty and Co.

== Forestry ==
At the end of the 1890s, the forestry industry was gaining momentum and importance in British Columbia and Charles began to invest in timber lands. In 1903, he founded Pretty's Timber Exchange. The corporation acted as brokers for timber limits scattered throughout the province, accumulating large acreages for sale by buying up numbers of smaller holdings. This was a huge success.

By the start of the First World War, Pretty was director or president of several major forestry companies. He was said to sell more timber in a day than any other man, making him a huge fortune. However, the Wall Street crash of 1929 hit business hard and he lost much of his businesses. His sons would go on to enter the logging industry, a venture that the family continues to be involved in to this day.

== Death ==
Charles Fenn Pretty died in May 1940, aged seventy-five. His wife, Charlotte, survived him by only one year.
