= Harrison station =

Harrison station may refer to:

== Transportation ==
- Harrison station (CTA), a rapid transit station in Chicago, Illinois
- Harrison station (CTA Westchester branch), a rapid transit station in Westchester, Illinois
- Harrison station (Metro-North), a commuter rail station in Harrison, New York
- Harrison station (NJ Transit), a former commuter rail station in Harrison, New Jersey
- Harrison station (PATH), a rapid transit station in Harrison, New Jersey
- Harrison Street station, a former main line station in Passaic, New Jersey
- Fort Harrison Terminal Station, a former interurban station in Marion County, Indiana
- Harrison station (Michigan), a station in Harrison, Michigan
- Harrison station (Maryland), a station in Harrison, Maryland

== Other ==
- Harrison Power Station, a power generating station in Haywood, West Virginia

== See also ==
- Harrison (disambiguation)
