= Harison =

Harison may refer to:

- Harison's Yellow, rose cultivar
- Francis Harison (died 1740), American lawyer and politician
- Richard Harison (1747–1829), American lawyer and politician
- Christopher Harison (1825–1897), British military officer and forestry official
- Harison (footballer) (born 1980), full name Harison da Silva Nery, Brazilian footballer

== See also ==
- Harrison (disambiguation)
