= President Harrison =

President Harrison may refer to:

- William Henry Harrison (1773–1841), 9th president of the United States
  - Presidency of William Henry Harrison (1841) his presidency
- Benjamin Harrison (1833–1901), 23rd president of the United States and grandson of the 9th president
  - Presidency of Benjamin Harrison (1889–1893) his presidency

== See also ==
- Category:United States presidential administrations
- Harrison (disambiguation)
- Harrison family of Virginia
