= Alexander Malcolm (rugby union) =

Scotland international rugby union player

- Born: Alexander George Malcolm; 9 November 1867 Glasgow, Scotland
- Died: 18 March 1951 (aged 83) Powell River, British Columbia, Canada
- University: University of Glasgow

Rugby union career
- Position: Forward
Amateur team(s)
| Years | Team | Apps | (Points) |
- Glasgow University
Provincial / State sides
| Years | Team | Apps | (Points) |
| 1887 | Glasgow District | | |
| 1888 | West of Scotland District | | |
International career
| Years | Team | Apps | (Points) |
| 1888 | Scotland | 1 | (0) |

Alexander Malcolm (9 November 1867 – 18 March 1951) was a Scotland international rugby union player.

== Rugby Union career ==
=== Amateur career ===
He played rugby union for Glasgow University.

=== Provincial career ===
He was capped by Glasgow District in the inter-city match of 1887.

He was capped by West of Scotland District in their match against East of Scotland District on 11 February 1888.

=== International career ===
Malcolm played once for Scotland; in the 1888 Home Nations Championship match against Ireland on 10 March 1888.

== Ranching in Canada ==
He emigrated to Canada in late 1888 and became a farmer, rather than pursuing a career in architecture. The Squakum Ranch, at the end of present day Malcolm Rd, was a commercial orchard on the banks of the Fraser River. Alex bought the property in the early 1890s. Apart from returns to Scotland, Lake Errock was his home for about 50 years. Their longest visit away was about 1896–1906.

== Marriage and children ==
In 1891, he married Mary Alberta Ross, who died in 1943.

They had four sons and two daughters. The sons were Colin Ross (1892–1945), Alexander George (1894–1947), Gordon Ross (1896–1917), and Ian. The daughters were Helen Ross (1896–1959) and Mary Hunter (1906–?).
