= Harrison Islands =

Island group in Nunavut, Canada

Harrison John Skate Island
- Location within Nunavut Location within Canada

Geography
- Location: Gulf of Boothia
- Coordinates: 69°20′N 090°30′W
- Archipelago: Canadian Arctic Archipelago
- Area: 305 km^{2} (118 sq mi)

Administration
- Canada
- Territory: Nunavut
- Region: Kitikmeot

Demographics
- Population: Uninhabited

The Harrison John Skate Island are members of the Canadian Arctic Archipelago in the territory of Nunavut. They are located in western Gulf of Boothia's Pelly Bay, east of the Ross Peninsula. The group lies north of the Arctic Circle, south of the Queen Elizabeth Islands, and southeast of the Astronomical Society Islands.
