= Justice Harrison =

Justice Harrison may refer to:

- Albertis Harrison (1907–1995), associate justice of the Virginia Supreme Court of Appeals
- George Moffett Harrison (1847–1923), associate justice of the Virginia Supreme Court of Appeals
- Horace Harrison (1829–1885), associate justice of the Tennessee Supreme Court
- James T. Harrison (judge) (1903–1982), associate justice of the Montana Supreme Court
- John B. Harrison (1861–1947), associate justice of the Oklahoma Supreme Court
- John C. Harrison (judge) (1913–2011), associate justice of the Montana Supreme Court
- Moses Harrison (1932–2013), associate justice of the Illinois Supreme Court
- Ralph C. Harrison (1833–1918), associate justice of the Supreme Court of California
- T. O. C. Harrison (1849–1919), associate justice of the Nebraska Supreme Court
- William A. Harrison (1795–1870), associate justice of the Supreme Court of Appeals of West Virginia
- William M. Harrison (1818–1900), associate justice of the Arkansas Supreme Court
