= Harrison, Wisconsin =

Harrison is the name of some places in the U.S. state of Wisconsin:

- Harrison (village), Wisconsin, a village in Calumet and Outagamie counties
- Harrison (town), Calumet County, Wisconsin, a town
  - Harrison (ghost town), Calumet County, Wisconsin, a ghost town
- Harrison, Grant County, Wisconsin, a town
- Harrison, Lincoln County, Wisconsin, a town
  - Harrison (community), Lincoln County, Wisconsin, an unincorporated community
- Harrison, Marathon County, Wisconsin, a town
- Harrison, Waupaca County, Wisconsin, a town
