= Harrison, Illinois =

Harrison, Illinois may refer to:

- Harrison, Jackson County, Illinois, a census-designated place in Jackson County
- Harrison, Winnebago County, Illinois, an unincorporated community in Winnebago County
