= Harrison (automobile) =

Defunct American motor vehicle manufacturer

Harrison Motor Car Company
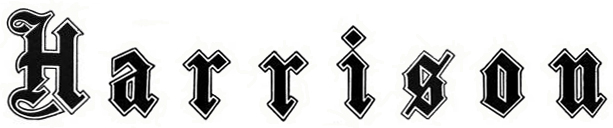
- Company type: Automobile manufacturing
- Industry: Automotive
- Founded: 1905
- Defunct: 1907
- Headquarters: Grand Rapids, Michigan
- Area served: United States
- Products: Vehicles; Automotive parts

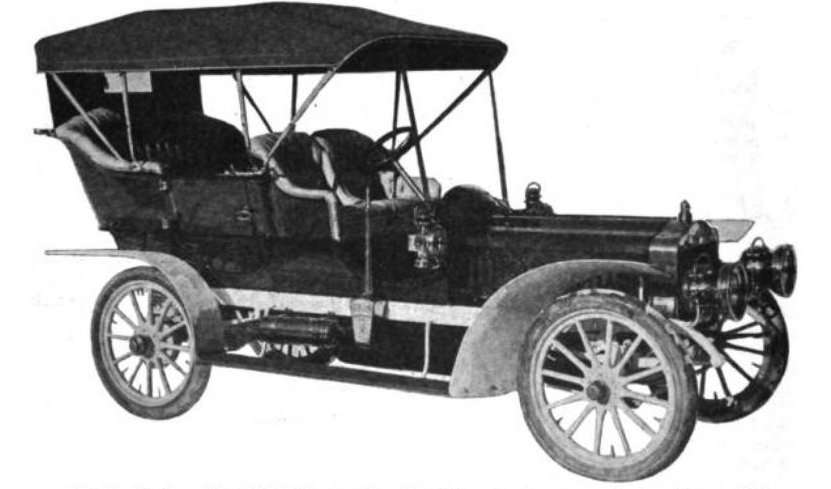
1906 Harrison Model B Touring Car

The Harrison was an American automobile built in Grand Rapids, Michigan originally by the Harrison Wagon Company from 1905 through 1906. The company was renamed to the Harrison Motor Car Company in 1907 before going defunct the same year.

== History ==
The Harrison grew to be a large vehicle, eventually having a wheelbase of 10 ft (3.0 m). The 1906 and 1907 models featured a self-starting system which introduced acetylene into the proper cylinder for starting 'on the spark'. The cars came with a four-cylinder engine of 6.3L in capacity, with overhead valves. Pushrods for the exhaust valves had a ring-shaped section so they could straddle the exhaust piping.
