= Stsʼailes people =

Indigenous people in British Columbia, Canada

The Stsʼailes (Halkomelem: Stsʼaʼí:les), also known as Chehalis (/ʃəˈheɪlɪs/ shə-HAY-liss) are an indigenous people from the Lower Mainland region of British Columbia, Canada.

Their band government is the Stsʼailes Nation, formerly known as the Chehalis First Nation or Chehalis Indian Band. The band's name community is located on Indian reserve lands at Chehalis, which is on the lower Harrison River between the towns of Mission and Agassiz. Their band's mailing address is in nearby Agassiz.

== Name ==
The name Sts'ailes means "beating heart", which became the name of their village, located on the west side of the Harrison River. Their usual English name, Chehalis, is identical to that of the much more numerous Chehalis people of southern Puget Sound in Washington. By Sts'ailes tradition, the southern Chehalis were separated from their homeland as a consequence of the Great Flood.

== Heritage ==
In Sts'ailes tradition, Xals, the Transformer, defeated a powerful shaman known as "the Doctor". Xals turned the shaman to stone, and broke the stone to pieces, spreading the fragments to prevent his return. The heart of the shaman fell on the shores of the home lake (Harrison Lake), and became the place where the Sts'ailes originated. There is evidence of this culture in the form of lithic (stone working) and mortuarial practices going back at least 1500 years.

There is evidence that the Sts'ailes people relied primarily on the salmon from the Fraser-Harrison watershed as their most important food source. Many of their religious ceremonies are derived from significant periods of the year important to the fishery.

While there is no modern link between the people (often referred to as Chehalis) and the Chehalis tribe of southwestern Washington, Sts'ailes heritage does speak of a flood that separated a southern portion of its people many years before.

The Sts'ailes have a distinct culture around visual arts and music.

== Language ==
Sts'ailes people traditionally speak Halqemeylem, the Upriver dialect of Halkomelem.

== Negotiations with British Columbia ==
The Sts'ailes do not participate in the 1999 framework Treaty process with British Columbia, citing the need to establish cultural identity and to be stewards of their ancestral homeland. Because of this, there is no process to settle any aboriginal rights issues, which the nation regards as unnecessary. The governing tribal council also points to an increasingly self-reliant community with jobs and services. Salmon fishing rights have been a point of controversy, which reached a climax in 2012 when the provincial government sued the Sts'ailes council for operating an illegal fishery. In the suit, then-chief Willie Charlie and fisheries manager Kim Charlie allegedly conspired to illegally fish for salmon in the Harrison River and Harrison Lake. Chief Harvey Paul argued that the salmon stock had been faithfully managed by the Sts'ailes for millennia, and that the illegal fishery was both hearsay, and the result of provincial mismanagement. The case was dropped in 2016, although a counter-suit by the nation is still pending.

== See also ==
- Sto:lo
- Coast Salish peoples
