= Harrison Hot Springs =

- Village
- Village of Harrison Hot Springs
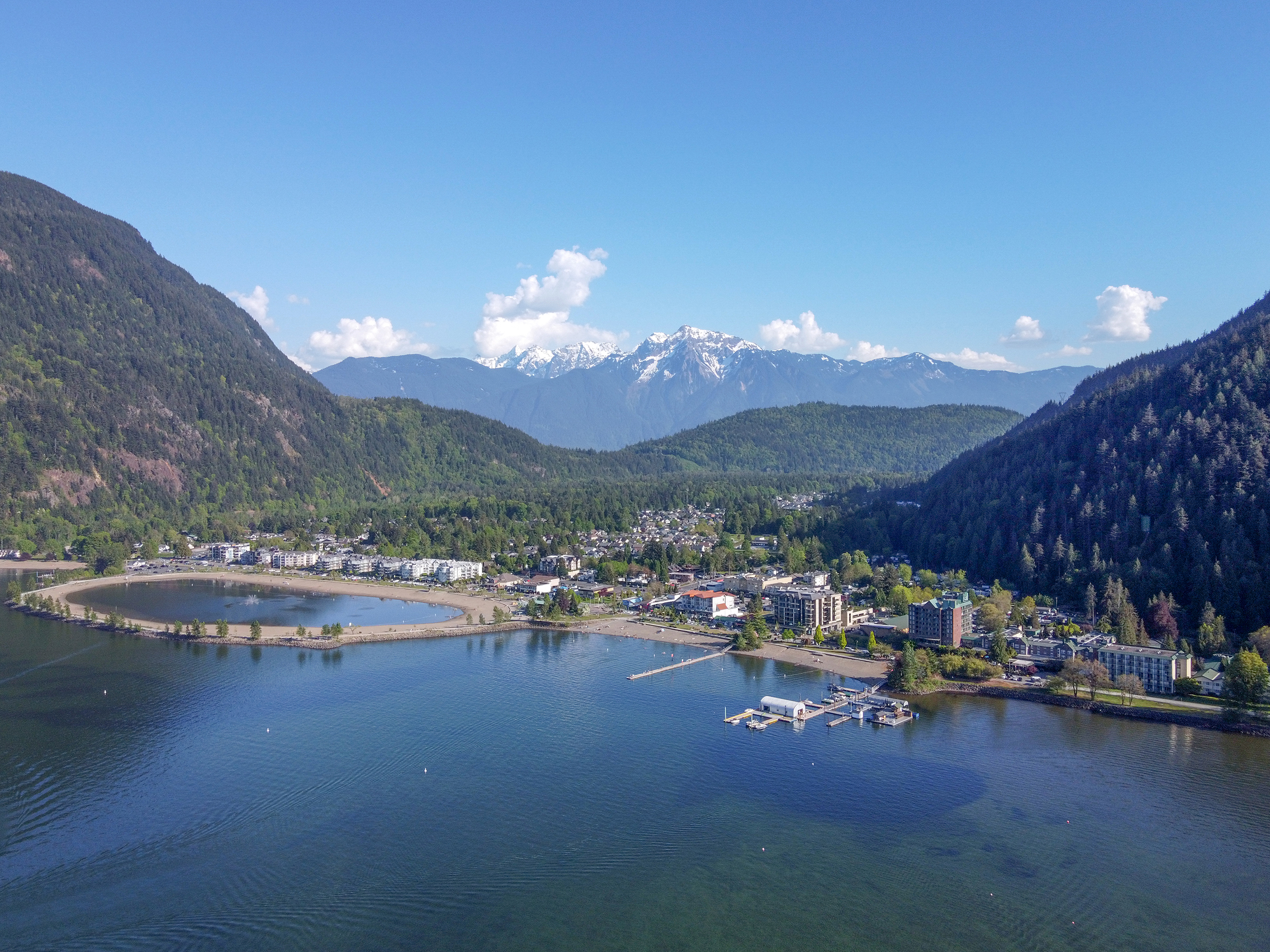
- Aerial view of downtown Harrison Hot Springs in 2026

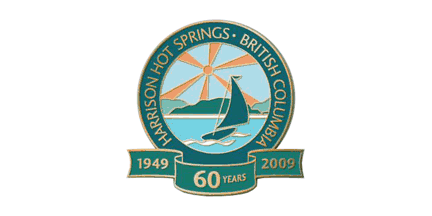
- Flag

- Location within British Columbia
- Coordinates: 49°18′00″N 121°46′55″W
- Country: Canada
- Province: British Columbia
- Regional district: Fraser Valley
- Incorporated (village): 1949
- Named for: Benjamin Harrison, deputy governor of the Hudson's Bay Company, 1835–1839

Government
  - Mayor: Fred Talen

Area
  - Land: 5.57 km^{2} (2.15 sq mi)

Population (2019)
  - Total: 1,632
  - Density: 263.4/km^{2} (682/sq mi)
- Time zone: UTC−07:00 (PT)
- Postal Code: V0M 1K0
- Area code: 604 / 778 / 236
- Website: www.harrisonhotsprings.ca

Harrison Hot Springs is a village located at the southern end of Harrison Lake in the Fraser Valley of British Columbia, Canada. It is a part of the Fraser Valley Regional District; its immediate neighbour is the District of Kent, which includes the town of Agassiz. As its name would suggest, it is a resort community known for its hot springs and has a population of just over 1,500 people. It is named after Benjamin Harrison, a former deputy governor of the Hudson's Bay Company.

== History ==
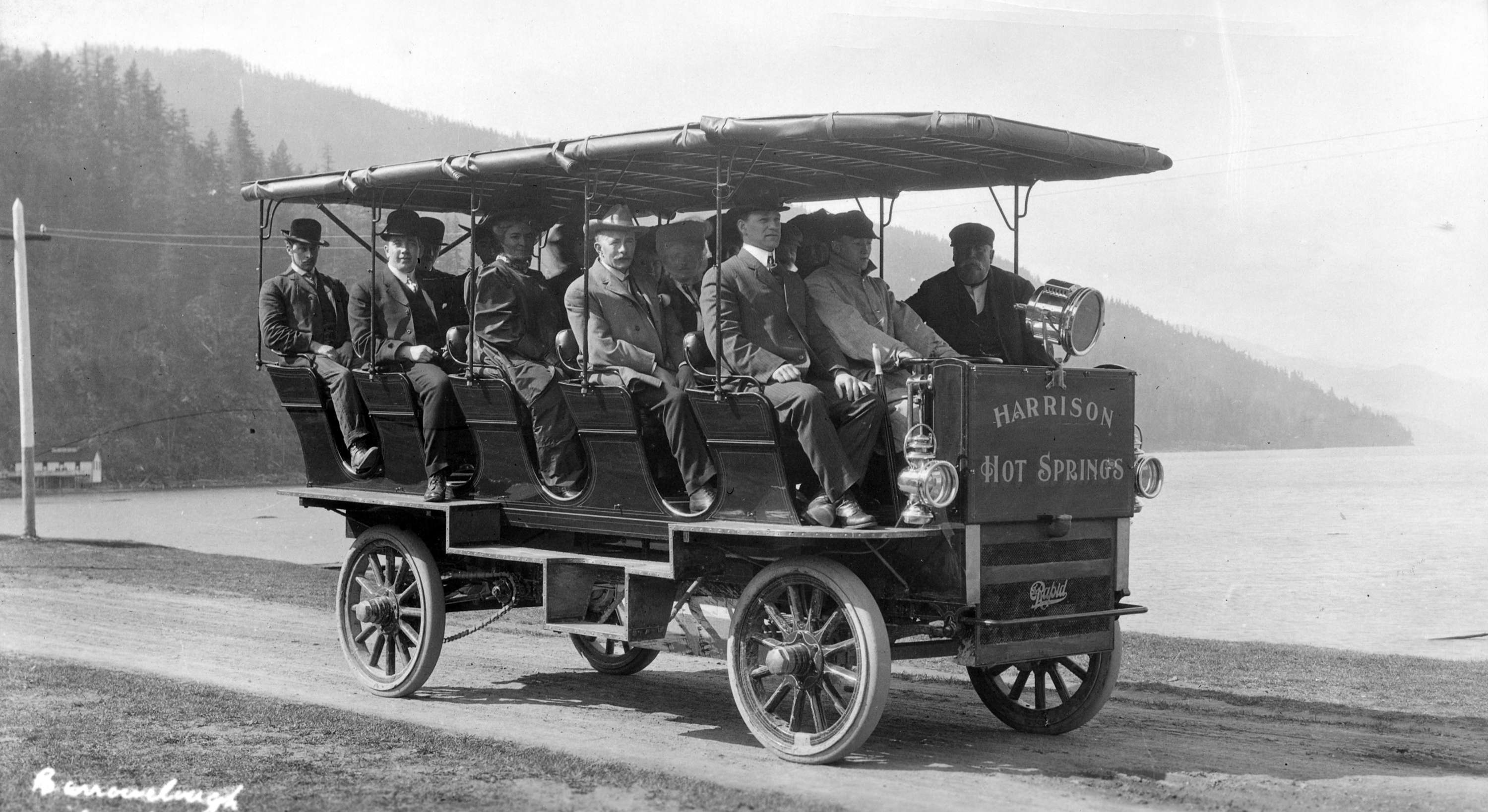
Harrison Hot Springs bus trip to C.P.R. Station at Agassiz, 1909.

The Village of Harrison Hot Springs began as a small resort community in 1886, when the opening of the Canadian Pacific Railway brought the lakeside springs within a short carriage ride of the transcontinental mainline. In its first promotion as a resort it was known as St. Alice's Well, although Europeans had discovered it decades earlier when a party of goldfield-bound travelers on Harrison Lake capsized into what they thought was their doom, only to discover the lake at that spot was not freezing, but warm. The springs had already been known to indigenous communities by then.

Although the resort flourished in a low-key fashion for years after this discovery was exploited by hoteliers, the Village of Harrison Hot Springs was not incorporated until 1949. Its namesake hot springs are a major attraction for tourists who come to stay at the village's spa resort.

The hot springs themselves were originally used and revered by the indigenous Sts'ailes (Chehalis) people who live along the Harrison River nearby and the Stʼatʼimc people living around the lake. There are two hot springs: the "Potash" with a temperature of 40 °C, and the "Sulphur" with a temperature of 65 °C. According to Harrison Hot Springs Resort, the waters average 1300 ppm of dissolved mineral solids, one of the highest concentrations of any mineral spring. This hot spring is one of several lining the valley of the Lillooet River and Harrison Lake. The northernmost of the Lillooet River hot springs is at Meager Creek, north of Whistler, with another well-known one to the east of Whistler at Skookumchuck Hot Springs, midway between Pemberton and Port Douglas. One feature of this chain of hot springs is that the Harrison Hot Springs vent is the most sulfuric, and there is consistently less sulfur content as one goes northwards, with the springs at Meager Creek having almost no scent at all.

== Geography ==
=== Megatsunami problem ===
Some geologists consider that an unstable rock face at Mount Breakenridge above the north end of the giant fresh-water fjord of Harrison Lake in the Lower Mainland of southwestern British Columbia, Canada, could collapse into the lake, generating a large wave that might destroy the town of Harrison Hot Springs (located at its south end).

== Demographics ==
2016 Canadian census
	Harrison Hot Springs	British Columbia
Median age	57.6 years	43.0 years
Under 15 years old	9.9%	14.9%
Over 65 years old	35.2%	18.3%
Protestant (2001)	37%	31%
Catholic (2001)	16%	17%

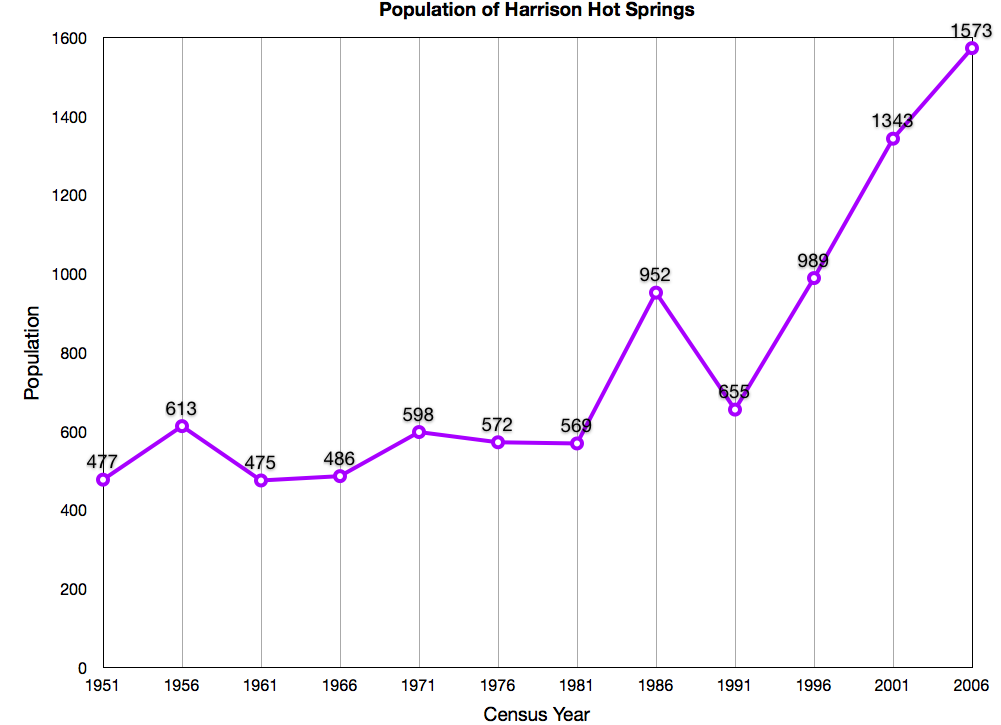
Harrison Hot Springs's population trend, 1951–2006, BC Stats

In the 2021 Census of Population conducted by Statistics Canada, Harrison Hot Springs had a population of 1,905 living in 885 of its 1,045 total private dwellings, a change of 29.8% from its 2016 population of 1,468. With a land area of 5.49 km^{2} (2.12 sq mi), it had a population density of 347.0/km^{2} (898.7/sq mi) in 2021.

The population of Harrison Hot Springs grew from 1996 to 2006, when the Canadian Census reported 655 people in 1991, 898 in 1996, 1,343 in 2001, and 1,573 in 2006. It has since receded slightly to 1,468 in 2011 and 2016.

=== Religion ===
According to the 2021 census, religious groups in Harrison Hot Springs included:

- Irreligion (1,075 persons or 57.6%)
- Christianity (735 persons or 39.4%)
- Sikhism (30 persons or 1.6%)
- Islam (10 persons or 0.5%)
- Other (15 persons or 0.8%)

== Economy ==
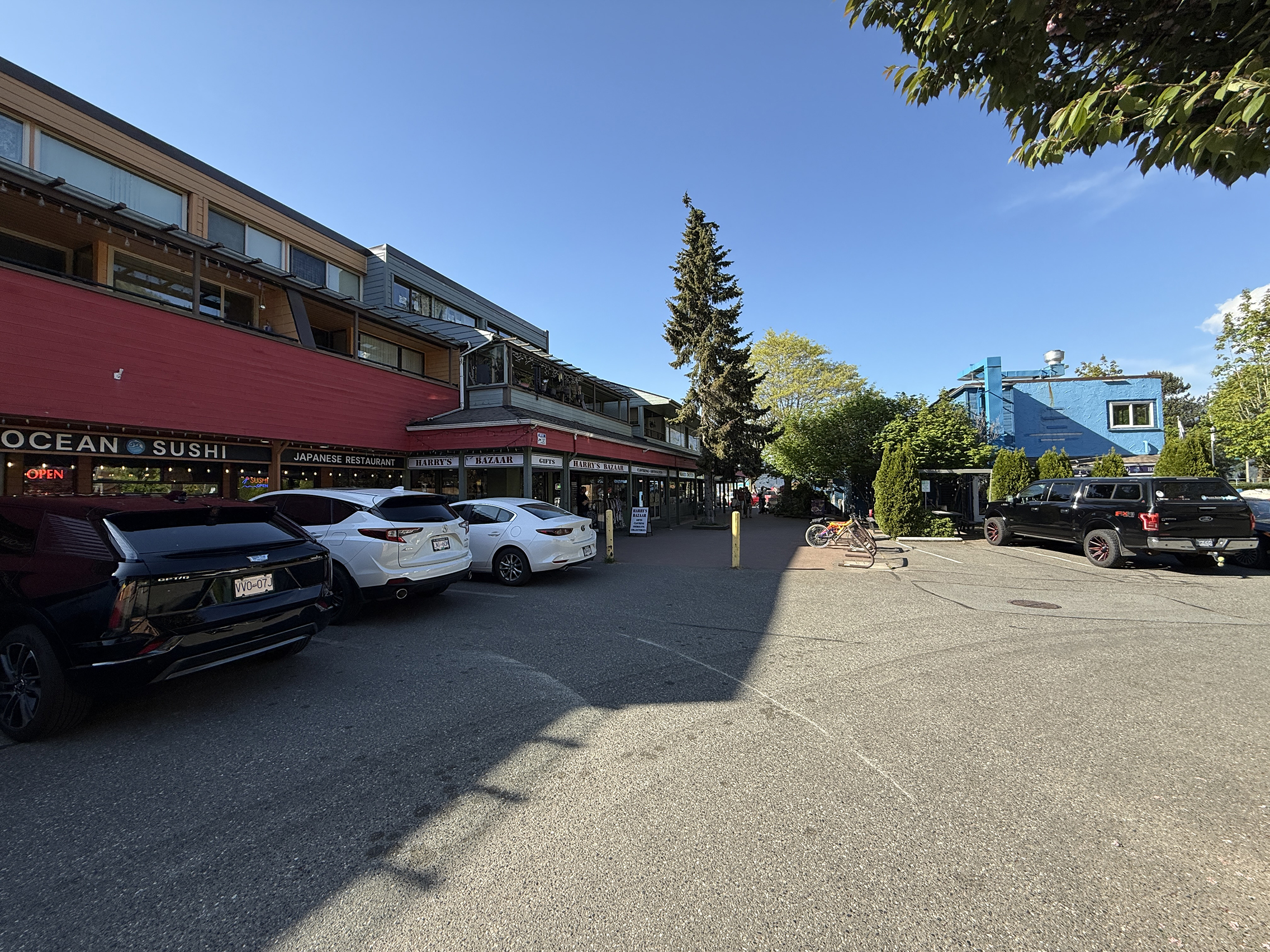
Harrison Village Mall

Harrison Hot Springs' major economy is tourism in relation to the hot springs, with over half of employment found in the service industries, with much of the rest split between retail, government, construction and manufacturing, as well as minor activity in other areas.

The hospitality industry employs a large majority of the jobs in Harrison Hot Springs, with much of the jobs coming from hotels and motels, and a growing economy stemming from the vacation rentals in the area.

== Attractions ==
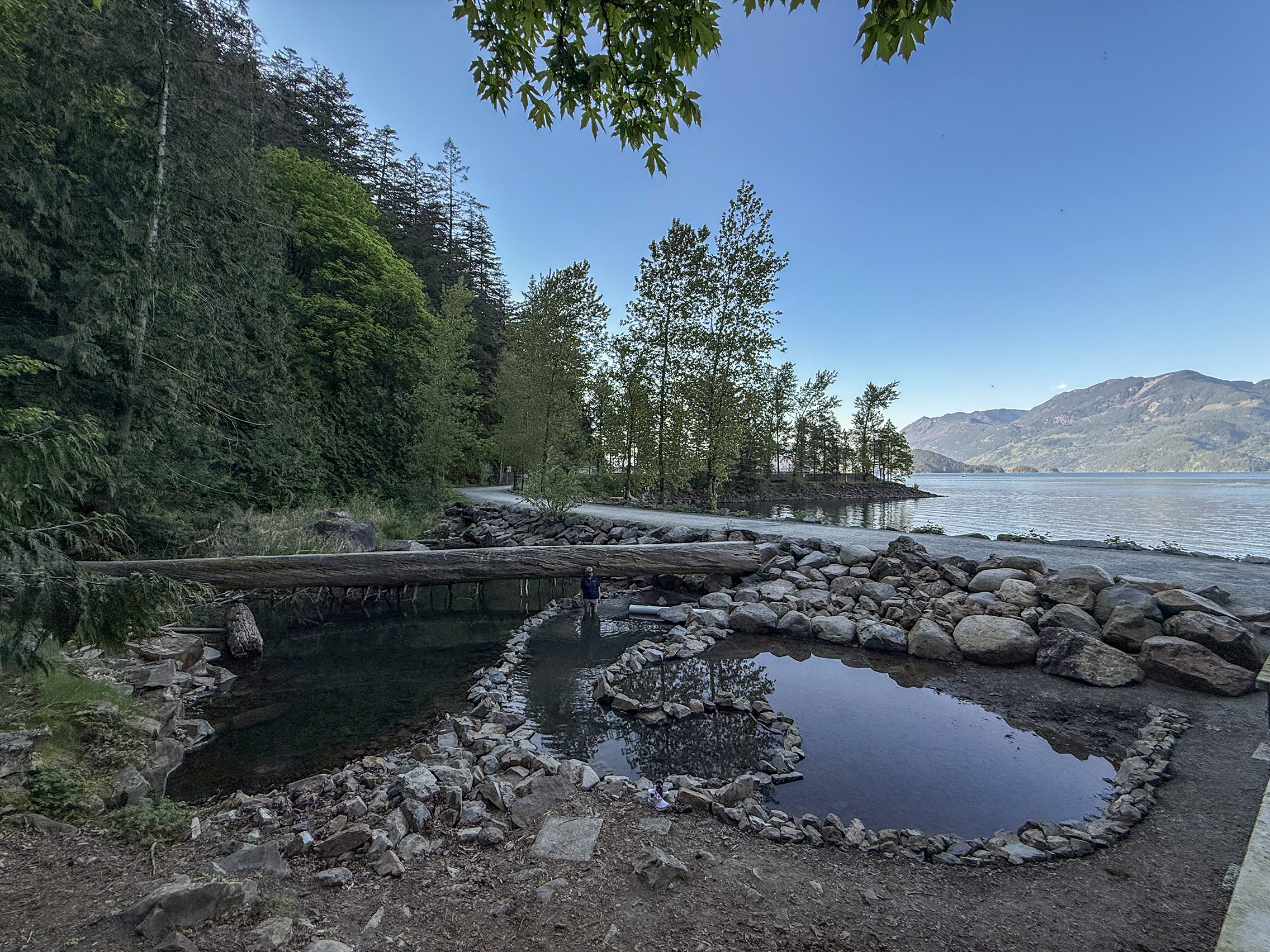
Harrison Hot Springs source

Aside from its titular springs, Harrison Hot Springs also has the Ranger Station Public Art Gallery, a marina with jet boat tours of the lake available, a nine-hole golf course, and is the closest access point to Sasquatch Provincial Park. In July, Harrison Hot Springs hosts the Harrison Festival of the Arts, a ten-day celebration of world music and art. The annual festival features free outdoor beach concerts, ticketed evening performances, a children's day, visual art exhibits, various workshops, and two-weekend art markets. The festival also presents ten to twelve professional performing arts events between September and May each year.

=== Bigfoot ===
Due to the fact that there have been many sightings of Bigfoot in the Fraser Valley near Harrison Hot Springs, the village has embraced the image of the creature. The official town mascot, appearing on signs and plush toys, is "Hot Springs Harry", a sasquatch; there are also several bigfoot sculptures throughout the village. The village has several gift shops that sell sasquatch-themed souvenirs, as well as a sasquatch museum.

== Government ==
The Corporation of the Village of Harrison Hot Springs was incorporated as a municipality in 1949 under the initiative of Colonel Andy Naismith (ret). It has a mayor and four councillors.

Harrison Hot Springs is part of the Fraser-Nicola provincial electoral district, following electoral redistribution that took effect with the 2024 British Columbia general election. Federally, Harrison Hot Springs is in the Mission-Matsqui-Fraser Canyon riding.

Harrison Hot Springs federal election results
Year	Liberal		Conservative		New Democratic		Green	
2021	28%	343	43%	537	19%	232	4%	52
2019	31%	347	41%	451	13%	139	13%	140

Harrison Hot Springs provincial election results
Year	New Democratic		Liberal		Green	
2020	45%	527	25%	296	10%	117
2017	34%	292	50%	435	16%	142

== Media ==
The primary local print outlet serving Harrison Hot Springs is the Agassiz-Harrison Observer, a weekly newspaper published in nearby Agassiz and owned by Black Press Media.

Radio broadcasting in the area is served by the commercial stations licensed to the Chilliwack market, which is the nearest major broadcast centre. As of 2025, the Chilliwack market is served by three commercial radio stations: CHWK-FM (operated by Pattison Media Ltd.) and CKKS-FM and CKSR-FM (both operated by Rogers Media Inc.).

== See also ==
- Harrison Mills, British Columbia
