= Harrison Mills, British Columbia =

Harrison Mills
- Unincorporated community
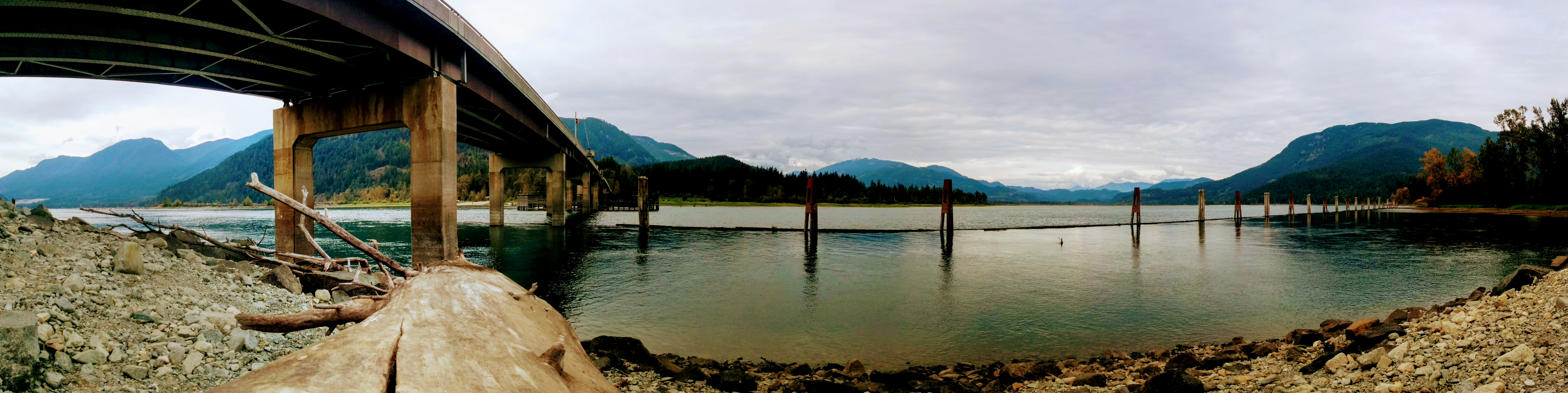
- Harrison River at Highway 7 bridge facing north
- Nickname: Kilby
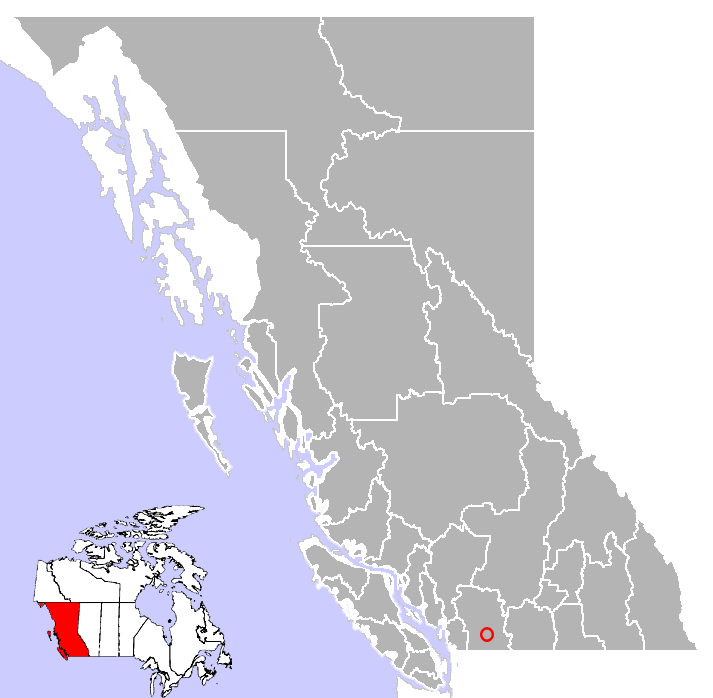
- Location of Harrison Mills
- Coordinates: 49°14′30″N 121°56′45″W
- Country: Canada
- Province: British Columbia
- Region: Fraser Valley/Lower Mainland
- Regional District: Fraser Valley Regional District
- Founded: 1859

Population (2016)
  - Total: 484
- Time zone: UTC−07:00 (PT)
- Area codes: 604, 778
- Website: http://www.kilby.ca

Harrison Mills, formerly Carnarvon and also Harrison River, is an agricultural farming and tourism-based community in the District of Kent west of Agassiz, British Columbia. The community is a part of the Fraser Valley Regional District. Harrison Mills is home to the British Columbia Heritage Kilby Museum and Campground.

== History ==
=== First Nations history ===
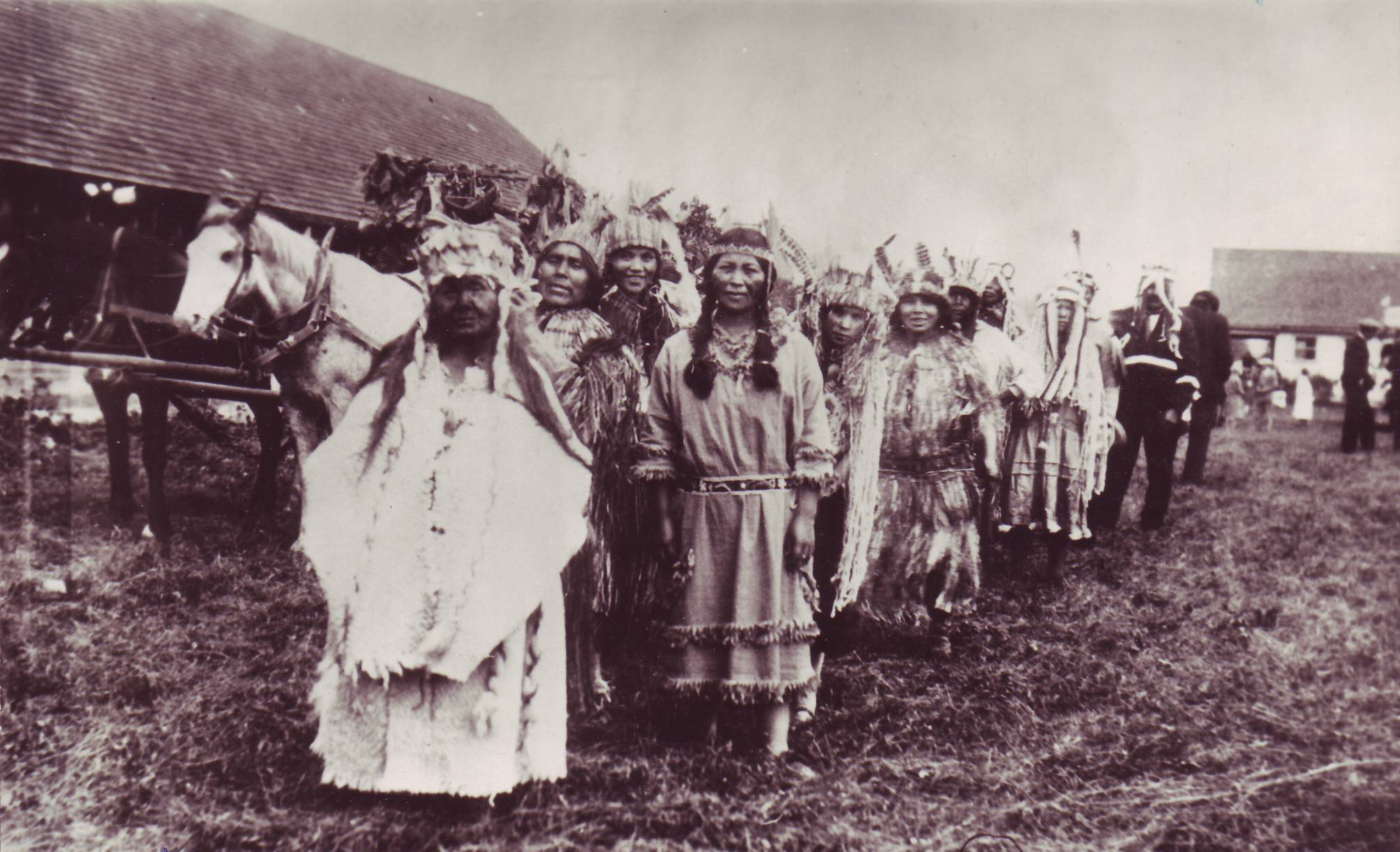
Chehalis First Nations

Harrison Bay is the home of the Sq'éwlets First Nation people, whose main reserve is on the bay's western shore, across from Harrison Mills, and also of the Sts'Ailes or Chehalis people, whose reserve is located on the north side of the bay along the lower Harrison River and around that river's confluence with its tributary, the Chehalis. The Scowlitz and Chehalis peoples once had large and famously carved longhouse villages, long since destroyed by the encouragement of missionaries. An archaeological site on the Harrison Mills side of the bay, the Scowlitz Mounds, also known as the Fraser Valley Pyramids, is under investigation by Simon Fraser University and the Scowlitz First Nation and represent an unusual period in the anthropological and cultural history of the Fraser Valley. The Sq'éwlets First Nation are Halqemeylem-speaking and are part of the Sto:lo cultural group, while the Sts'ailes (Chehalis) identify themselves separately and speak a dialect of Halqemeylem that has similarities with the Lower Lillooet River dialect of St'at'imcets (Ucwalmicwts).

The dialect spoken by the Sts'Ailes, whose name means "beating heart", includes the word sesqac, which is the source of the English word "sasquatch". The vicinity of Harrison Bay, Harrison Mills and the lower Harrison River is reputed to have the greatest number and density of sasquatch sightings worldwide. The sasquatch is the emblem of the Chehalis First Nation and is sacred in Sts'Ailes culture. The opening of Fort Langley in 1827 downriver began changing the traditional patterns of life for the Scowlitz and Chehalis by the introduction of new goods and also an end to raids by the Euclataws Kwakwaka'wakw (Southern Kwakiutl) of Cape Mudge and other northern coastal tribes.

=== Settlement and colonization ===
==== 1859–1914 ====
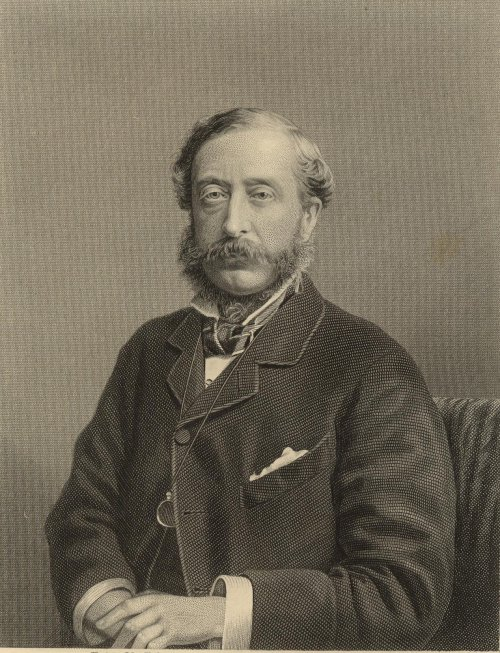
Henry Herbert, 4th Earl of Carnarvon

In 1859, Governor James Douglas named the meeting place of the Harrison and Fraser rivers Carnarvon in honour of Henry Herbert Molyneux, the fourth Earl of Carnarvon. At the time of its naming, the town consisted of one crude hotel. Partly because of this, the name never caught on and the town-to-be never grew as hoped. For a time, official maps of the area duly recorded the name as Carnarvon but almost all newspapers and diaries referred to it as Harrisonmouth.

In just a few weeks, during the Fraser Canyon Gold Rush of 1858, 30,000 men travelled up the Fraser River to the Fraser Canyon, upstream from Hope. Many stopped along the way, with sandbars along the Fraser near Harrison Mills and throughout the Fraser Valley turned over by prospectors. Gold was found around Harrison Mills and as far downstream as the present site of Mission, but extraction was profitable only above Hope.

The first settlers of note, and perhaps the most important, were Captain William Menten and his wife Emma who arrived in 1890. Emma Menten became the owner of the aforementioned hotel that had been expanded over the years. The next prominent family to arrive was that of Charles Fenn Pretty who built a spacious lodge in 1903. Finally, Joseph Martin built a large sawmill in 1892 beside the railway. The construction of this mill would move the townsite away from Lot 10A which was bordered on all sides by the Scowlitz reserve and towards Harrison Bay, a move that would have significant repercussions.

It was at this time that Emma Menten moved her store from Lot 10A to a site immediately east of the Martin mill in order to compete with a new store by the railway opened by Laurie and David Galbraith. Meanwhile, Captain Menten built a small sternwheeler called the Minto to carry passengers between Chilliwack and Harrison Mills. This increased the traffic coming across the Fraser River from Chilliwack and spurred business in the town.

The Rat Portage Mill, early 1900s.

Quite suddenly, two new mills were constructed: a shingle mill, which would remain in operation until 1942, and a larger sawmill that replaced the old Martin mill, bought by the Tretheweys. James Trethewey sr. was an ambitious man with big plans for the enterprise. In November 1899, the Harrison River Mills Timber and Trading Company was incorporated. Trethewey planned to run the business jointly with his two sons, as well as Thomas Jackson of Chilliwack, T.A. Cuddy and Frank Boyd. With these mills came a large influx of people. A school and church were built in 1901 to meet the needs of the expanding town. Before this, children had to cross the river by boat to go to school; this is how Maud Menten, one of Harrison Mills's most famous residents, was educated.

In June 1903, the Tretheweys decided to sell half-interest in their mill to the Rat Portage Lumber Company but before the contracts could be signed and the cheque handed over, a fire swept through the millsite, destroying the buildings, machinery and lumber. The company's losses were estimated at $50,000 above its insurance coverage. As a result of this, the Rat Portage company bought the entire holdings of the Tretheweys in October 1903. When the new mill was opened in 1909, it was one of BC's largest sawmills. The Chilliwack Progress estimated the mill's daily capacity at 100,000 to 150,000 feet.

It was in these adjoining years of relative inactivity in the sawmill that Thomas and Eliza Kilby built and opened their famous store. They bought the two adjoining lots from Emma and Robert (son) Menton in 1906, building in two stages. The store itself was built in 1906, while the hotel was built in 1907, doubling the size of the building. In direct competition was the Rat Portage store and boarding house, built only six months after the T. Kilby General Store opened.

In 1910, a blow was struck to the business in Harrison Mills. The B.C. Electric Line opened on October 3, 1910, serving passengers going between Chilliwack and New Westminster. Much of the town's business at that point was Chilliwack residents wanting to travel by rail, but after construction, westbound travelers would switch to the new route. On October 10, 1910, Eliza Kilby closed the hotel, leaving it open as a boarding house for many years. Finally, the CNR was opened in 1915 passing through Chilliwack, offering a direct route to eastern Canada. Harrison Mills' role as a traffic junction was completely finished.

==== 1914–1950 ====
Bridge Guard at Harrison Mills

The outbreak of war in 1914 delayed all chance of recovery. Somewhat surprisingly, the government stationed a ten-man bridge guard from the Duke of Connaught's Own Rifles at Harrison Mills for the duration of the war. They were stationed as a security precaution against sabotage to the CPR line, the vital transcontinental link.

The end of the war brought demands for improvement and development. There was an expectation that the Rat Portage mill would be opening once more and transform the town into a busy commercial centre once again. The company began to make plans early in 1921, when they offered to buy land from Thomas Kilby. However, it ultimately decided to pull out of the town altogether, to concentrate on its mill in Vancouver. The machinery was sold and the buildings left vacant, until a fire in 1930 claimed most of what was left. The fire was so intense that the railway had to be closed for a day, delaying Prime Minister Mackenzie King himself in Agassiz while repairs were made.

However, the old shingle mill continued to run and employ a fair number of people. But despite this, the town settled back into a quiet farming existence.

Through the 1920s, the main concern of residents was the construction of a major highway connection. After a strong showing on behalf of residents of Harrison Mills in 1912, the Kent Municipal Council decided to construct the road over Mount Woodside and through the Harrison Mills floodplain. However, it was not until twelve years later that the construction was started. In 1924, the project began after numerous petitions by Acton Kilby (son of Thomas and Eliza who was by now running the store). Upon completion, the road was not as useful as hoped. It took Acton Kilby four and a half hours to drive to Vancouver.

The next major issue was dyking along the Harrison and Fraser Rivers. In 1921, Thomas Kilby began to recruit his neighbours to sign a petition to the Municipality of Kent urging construction. However, a rival petition circulated by James Duncan upset the Kilby petition and he did not manage to collect the necessary 51% of the property owners. By 1925, the farmers had organized in a committee that constructed a private dyke that consisted of a 3' wall from the Bateson Slough to the CPR tracks at the Harrison Mills railway station.

== Notable people ==
Maud Leonora Menten (1879–1960), physician and biochemist, received her early education in Harrison Mills.

== Geography ==
Harrison Mills is located on a floodplain at the western foot of Mount Woodside at the outlet of Harrison Bay, a large lake-like backwater of the Harrison River just before that river's confluence with the Fraser.

== See also ==
- Canadian Pacific Railway in BC
- Kilby Provincial Park
