= Kilby Provincial Park =

Provincial park in British Columbia, Canada

- IUCN category II (national park)
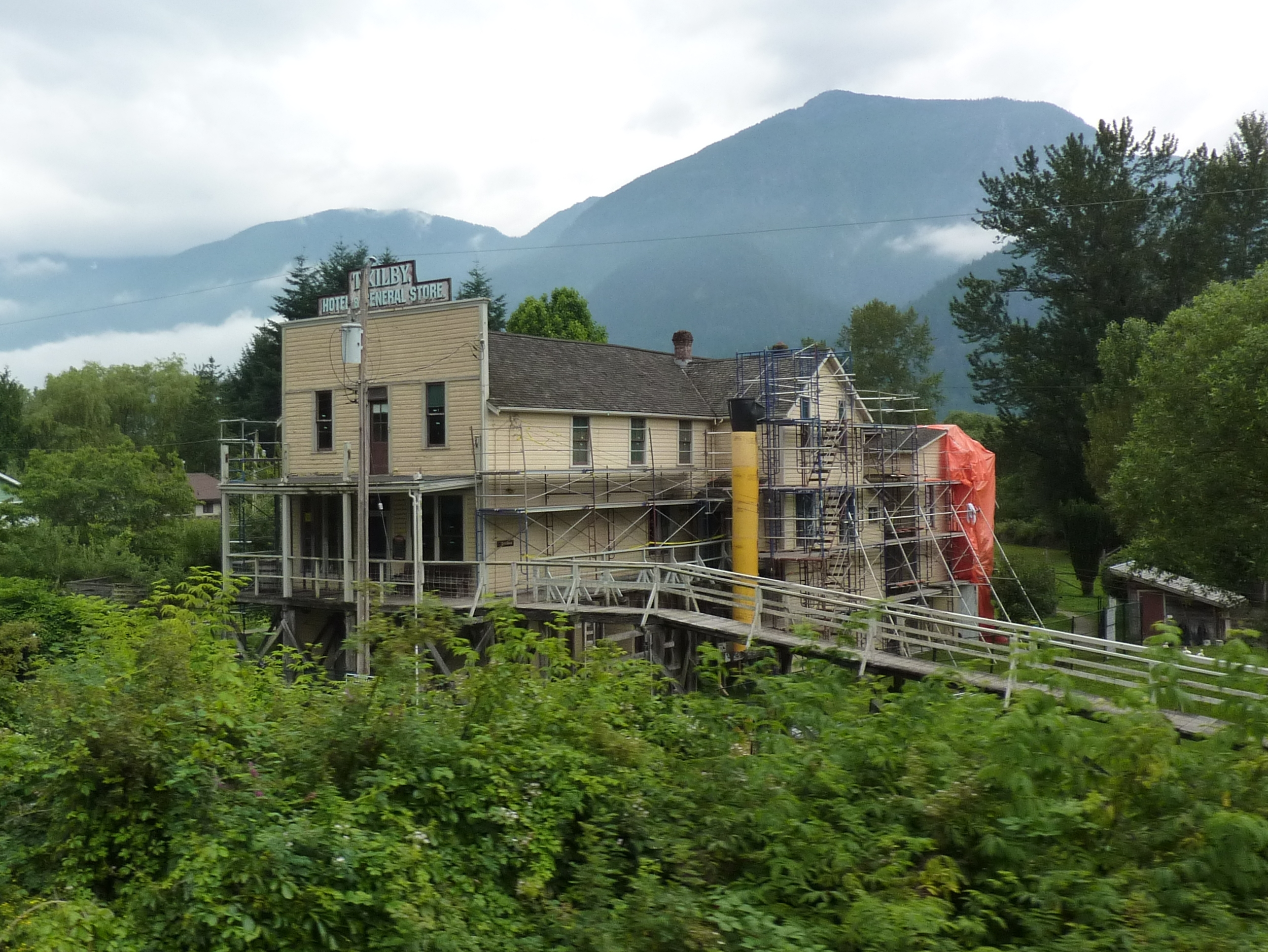
- Kilby Hotel and General Store

- Location within British Columbia Location within Fraser Valley Regional District
- Interactive map of Kilby Provincial Park
- Location: Harrison Mills, British Columbia, Canada
- Coordinates: 49°14′17″N 121°57′49″W
- Established: 28 August 1973
- Governing body: BC Parks
- Website: kilby.ca

Kilby Provincial Park is a provincial park in British Columbia, Canada. Kilby Park is located in Harrison Mills, on the Harrison River overlooking Harrison Bay in the Upper Fraser Valley of southwestern British Columbia. It comprises 3 hectares (7.4 acres) with 30 campsites and a boat launch. The park offers a sandy summer beach and fall/winter viewing of bald eagles and migrating trumpeter swans from Alaska.

== Kilby Historic Site ==
Kilby Historic Site is a living history site bringing early life in the Fraser Valley to light. The 3-hectare (7.4-acre) heritage farm includes the 1906 General Store Museum and Manchester House Hotel & Post Office, as well as costumed interpreters, friendly farm animals and an orchard playground. The focal point is the General store, once a temperance hotel built on pilings and linked to the railway station by a ramp to its second storey.

Thomas and Eliza Kilby converted it to a general store in 1906. Their son, Acton, took over the reins in 1922 and inherited the store when Thomas died in 1928. He and his wife Jessie would continue to operate and manage the store until 1977. In 1926, automobiles began to appear at Harrison Mills, and the Kilbys installed gravity-fed gas pumps that served travellers till 1977. In 1973, Acton received a plaque from Imperial Oil, rewarding him for fifty years of service.

Situated on a flood plain, the General Store and other buildings were elevated and connected with boardwalks. Today, visitors can see a fascinating gallery of store products and enjoy firsthand involvement with the intriguing artefacts of the farm and its current livestock.
