= Harrison Lake =

Lake in British Columbia, Canada

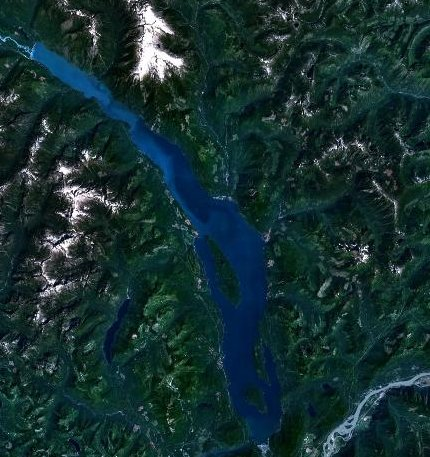

- Location within British Columbia
- Location: Coast Mountains, British Columbia
- Coordinates: 49°30′N 121°50′W
- Primary inflows: Lillooet River, Silver Creek
- Primary outflows: Harrison River
- Basin countries: Canada
- Max. length: 60 km (37 mi)
- Max. width: 9 km (5.6 mi)
- Surface area: 218 km^{2} (84 sq mi)
- Average depth: 151.4 m (497 ft)
- Max. depth: 279 m (915 ft)
- Water volume: 33 km^{3} (27,000,000 acre⋅ft)
- Surface elevation: 10 m (33 ft)
- Settlements: Harrison Hot Springs

Harrison Lake is the largest lake in the southern Coast Mountains of Canada, being about 250 square kilometres (95 mi^{2}) in area. It is about 60 km (37 mi) in length and at its widest almost 9 km (5.6 mi) across. Its southern end, at the resort community of Harrison Hot Springs, is c. 95 km east of downtown Vancouver. East of the lake are the Lillooet Ranges while to the west are the Douglas Ranges. The lake is the last of a series of large north–south glacial valleys tributary to the Fraser along its north bank east of Vancouver, British Columbia. The others to the west are the Chehalis, Stave, Alouette, Pitt, and Coquitlam Rivers. Harrison Lake is a natural lake, not man-made. The lake is supplied primarily from the Lillooet River, which flows into the lake at the northernmost point.

At the north end of the lake is a small First Nations community of the In-SHUCK-ch Nation, Port Douglas, known in the St'at'imcets language as Xa'xtsa (ha-htsa). There are three hot springs along the shores of the lake or near it, including near Port Douglas, at Clear Creek, a tributary of Silver River, and at Harrison Hot Springs. Doctors Point on the lake's northwest shore was a village and Transformer site, with a large rock painting depicting either the spirit of the winds that rule travel on the lake, or a medicine man turned to stone by the Transformer.

The lake has imposed a higher risk to recreational users than other lakes in BC as it is colder than many of the lakes in the surrounding areas. Harrison Lake was implicated in the deaths of three people in 2015, and five total since 2008.

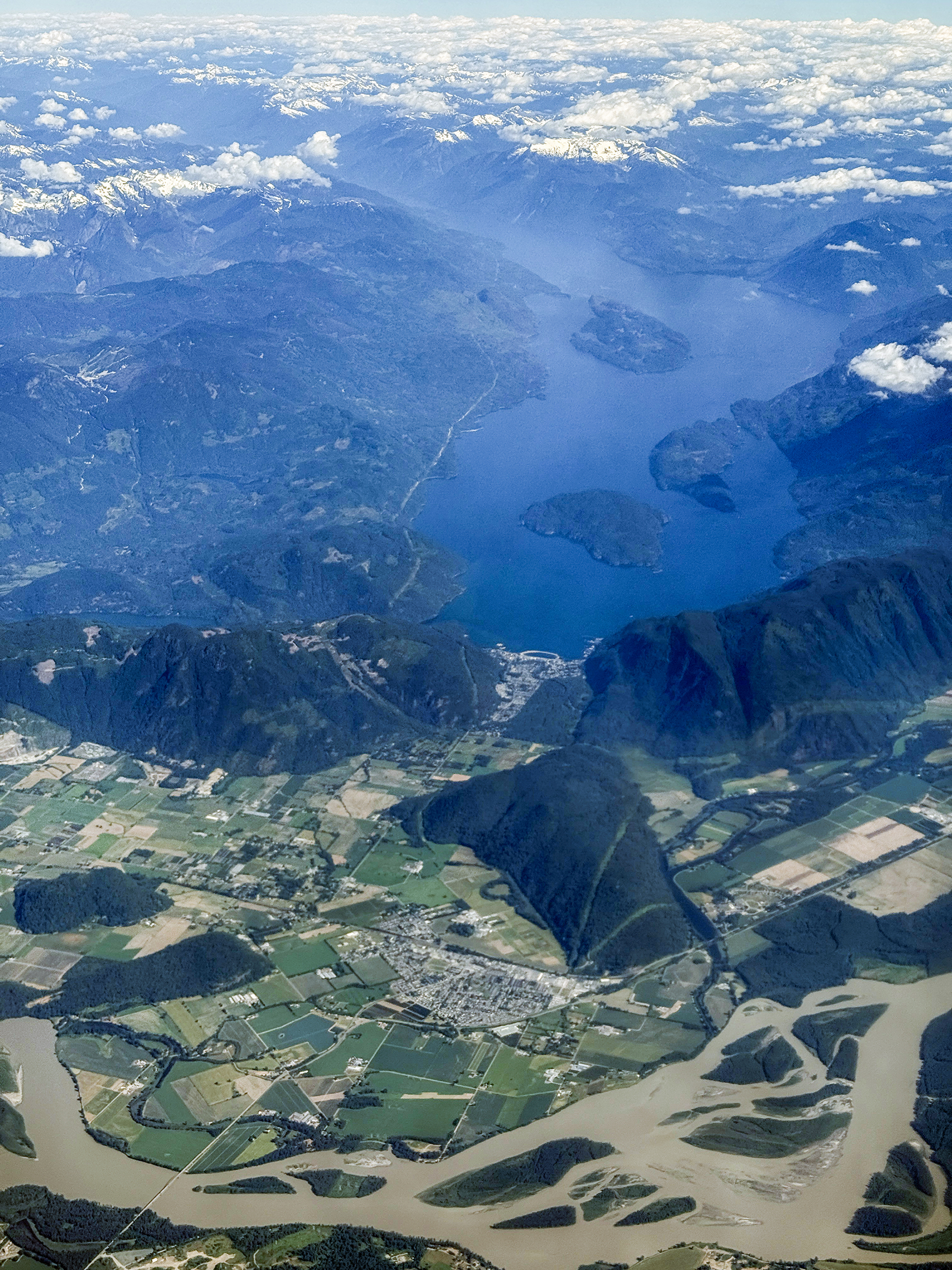
Harrison Lake seen from the air.

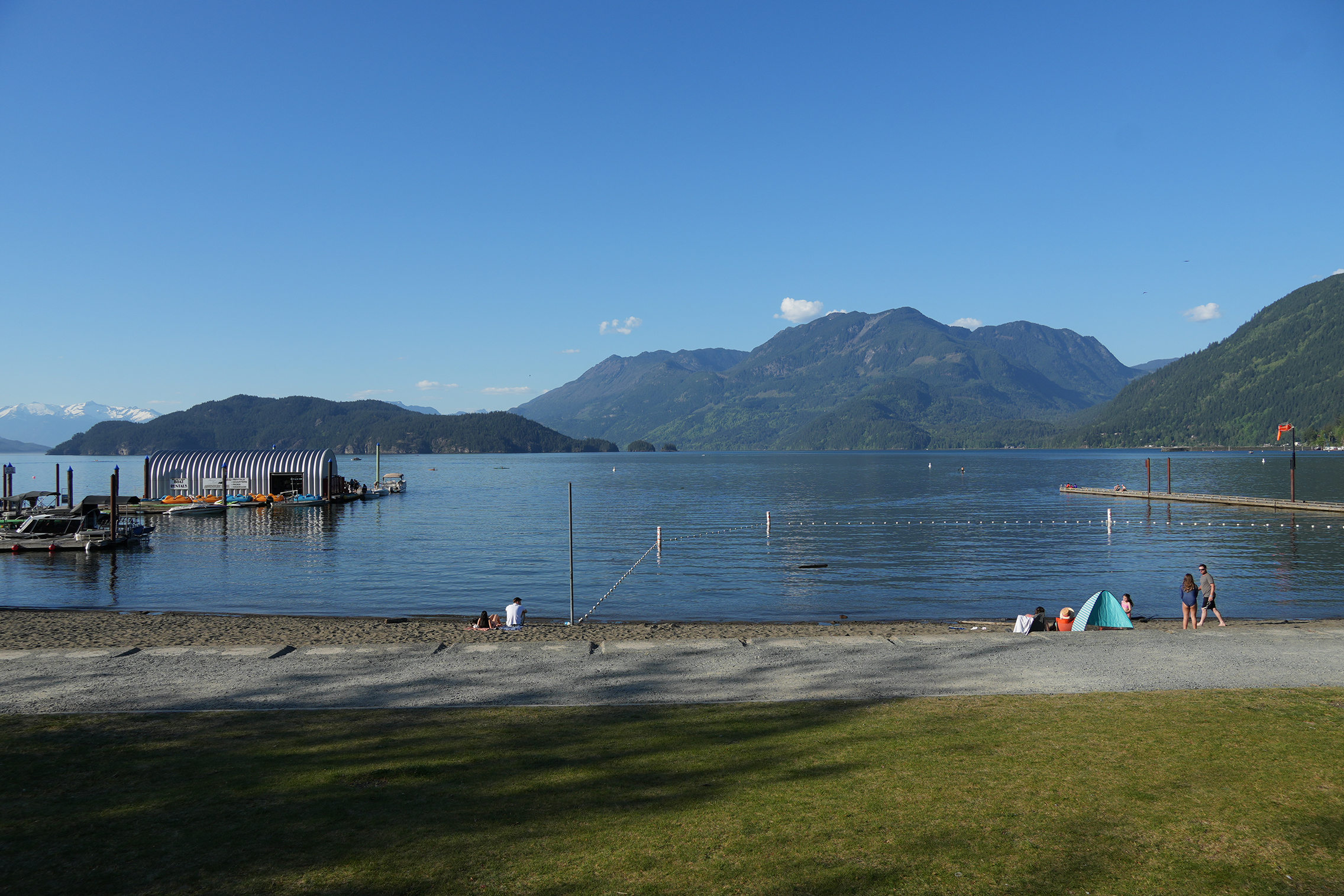
Harrison Lake Beach

To the east of the Lillooet River's entrance, at the northernmost part of Harrison Lake, there is a small bay named Little Harrison Lake. The site of one of British Columbia's oldest ghost towns, called Port Douglas, is located at the north shore of Little Harrison Lake, although there's virtually nothing left of the town. On the eastern shore of Little Harrison Lake is the rancherie (village) of the Port Douglas Band of the In-SHUCK-ch Nation. Halfway down Harrison Lake on its eastern shore is the valley of the Silver River, also known as the Big Silver River, one of its tributaries being the Little Silver.

Opposite Silver River on the west shore of Harrison Lake is Twenty-Mile Bay. Mid-lake between the Silver River and Twenty-Mile Bay is the northern end of the lake's longest and largest island, aptly named Long Island, 9.5 km long, 2.6 km wide. The other main island of any size in the lake is Echo Island, 4 km long and 2.2 km wide. It is offshore from Harrison Hot Springs, and is immediately east of the forested canyon of the Harrison River at the lake's outflow. The Harrison enters the Fraser near the community of Chehalis.

Harrison Lake was important in the early history of British Columbia as one of the water links on the Douglas Road, which accessed the goldfields of the upper Fraser during the Fraser Canyon Gold Rush of 1858–60. It was named "Harrison" by Hudson's Bay Company Governor Simpson, after Benjamin Harrison, a director (later Deputy Governor) of the Hudson's Bay Company.

== See also ==
- List of lakes of British Columbia
