= Chehalis, British Columbia =

Chehalis
- Location of Chehalis in British Columbia
- Coordinates: 49°18′00″N 121°54′00″W
- Country: Canada
- Province: British Columbia
- Area codes: 604, 778

Chehalis (/ʃəˈheɪlɪs/ shə-HAY-liss) is a small forestry, agricultural and First Nations community in the Lower Mainland of British Columbia located on Highway 7 on the west bank of the Harrison River between the town of Mission and the resort community of Harrison Hot Springs.

Chehalis is the site of Chehalis Indian Reserve No. 5 of the Sts'Ailes people and their government, the Chehalis First Nation. The Chehalis River enters the Harrison near the reserve community, which is on IR No. 5. Chehalis Indian Reserve No. 6 is across the Harrison from the main community, which is home to various non-native businesses as well as native-operated ones.
