= Harrison River =

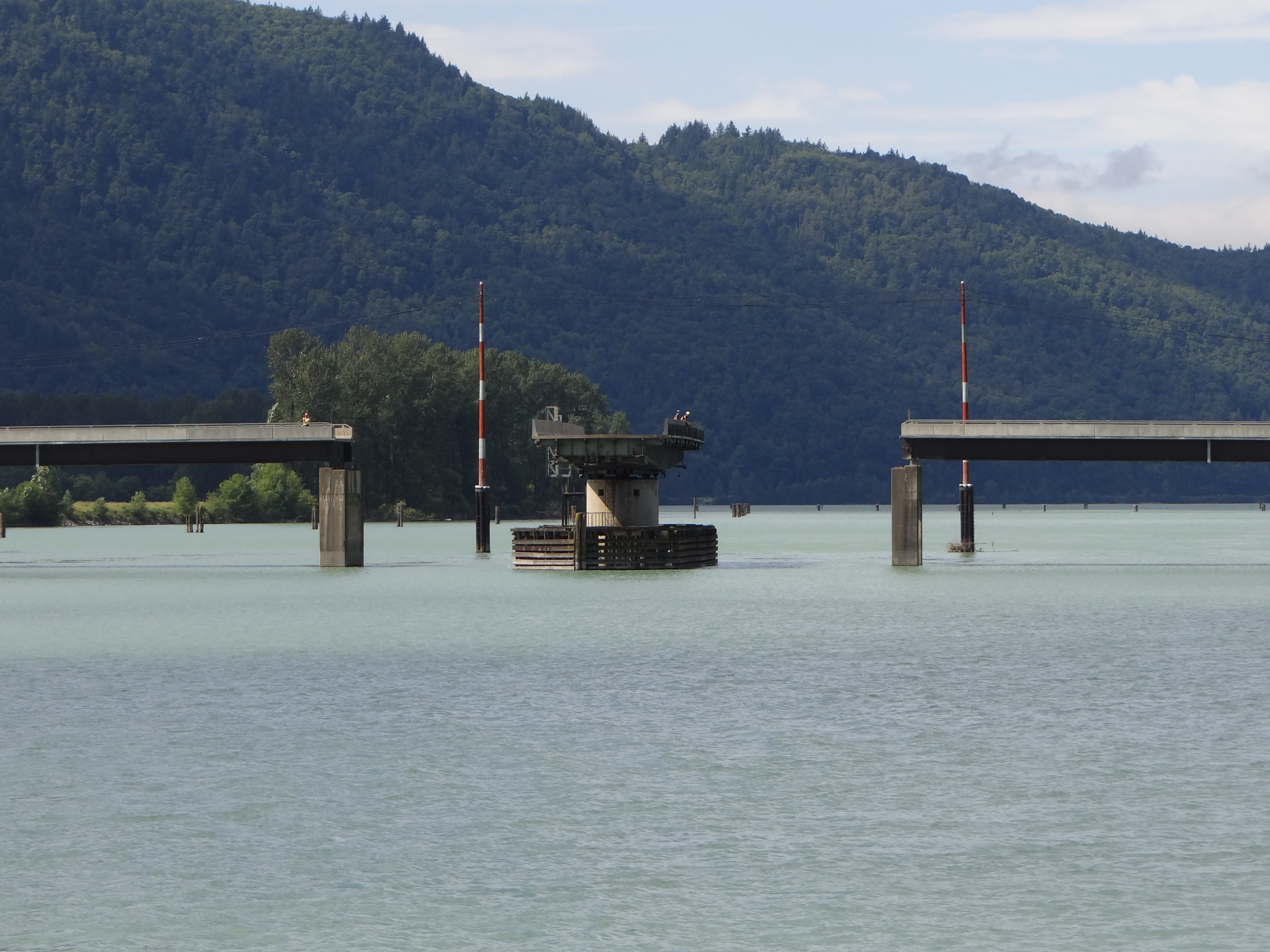

Location
- Country: Canada
- Province: British Columbia
- District: New Westminster Land District
- Towns: Chehalis, Harrison Mills

Physical characteristics
- Source: Harrison Lake
- Mouth: Fraser River
  - location: Harrison Mills
  - coordinates: 49°13′44″N 121°56′47″W
  - elevation: 15 m (49 ft)
- Basin size: 7,870 km^{2} (3,040 sq mi)
- Discharge
  - location: Harrison Hot Springs
  - average: 442 m^{3}/s (15,600 cu ft/s)
  - minimum: 66.3 m^{3}/s (2,340 cu ft/s)
  - maximum: 1,930 m^{3}/s (68,000 cu ft/s)

Basin features
- Tributaries
  - right: Chehalis River, Morris Creek

The Harrison River is a short but large tributary of the Fraser River, entering it near the community of Chehalis, British Columbia, Canada. The Harrison drains Harrison Lake and is the de facto continuation of the Lillooet River, which feeds the lake.

The Harrison is navigable, although in the days of the Fraser Canyon Gold Rush of it was necessary to dredge the sandbars at the confluence with the Fraser, which were known as "the Riffles", and also as "the Falls of the Harrison". Dredging of these shallows was needed to make the river navigable to Harrison Lake, at the north end of which the townsite of Port Douglas was established as the port for the Douglas Road to Lillooet in the upper Fraser Canyon, in order to bypass hostile territory in the lower Canyon (see Fraser Canyon War). There are also small rapids and difficult water in the first stretch of the river downstream from Harrison Lake, which is a forested canyon.

Below the confluence of the Chehalis River, at the bridge between Chehalis and the Municipality of Kent, the river widens into a wide backwater, Harrison Bay, then from there joins the Fraser. In addition to the aforementioned bridge (Hwy 7) the Harrison is also crossed by the mainline of the Canadian Pacific Railway at the site of the former milltown of Harrison Mills and the heritage post office and store preserved as Kilby Provincial Park.

== Natural history ==
The Harrison and Lillooet Rivers support a number of fish species, the most significant of which are chinook salmon (Oncorhynchus tshawytscha), sockeye salmon (Oncorhynchus nerka), coho salmon (Oncorhynchus kisutch), chum salmon (Oncorhynchus keta), pink salmon (Oncorhynchus gorbuscha), rainbow trout (Oncorhynchus mykiss), coastal cutthroat trout (Oncorhynchus clarki clarki), Largescale sucker (Catostomus macrocheilus), and Redside shiner (Richardsonius balteatus).

The river also has crayfish (P. leniusculus).

== Discharge ==
There are a number of stream gauges measuring water levels and discharge along the Harrison River and Harrison Lake. The most downriver discharge-measuring gauge is located at Harrison Hot Springs, just below Harrison Lake. The river's mean annual discharge according to this long-operating gauge is 442 cubic metres per second (15,600 cu ft/s). However, the Chehalis River joins the Harrison below this gauge, near Harrison Mills. According to a gauge on the Chehalis River near Harrison Mills that river's mean annual discharge is 39.1 cubic metres per second (1,380 cu ft/s). Thus the mean annual discharge of the Harrison River at its mouth on the Fraser River is at least 481.1 cubic metres per second (16,990 cu ft/s).

== See also ==
- List of tributaries of the Fraser River
- List of rivers of British Columbia
