= Neighbourhoods in Chilliwack =

Chilliwack is a city made up of several amalgamated villages and communities. The urban core has a decidedly north–south axis bisected by the Trans-Canada Highway. The city is bounded in north by the Fraser River, in the east by the Eastern Hillsides, in the south by the Canada-U.S. border, and in the west by the Vedder Canal.

== North side ==
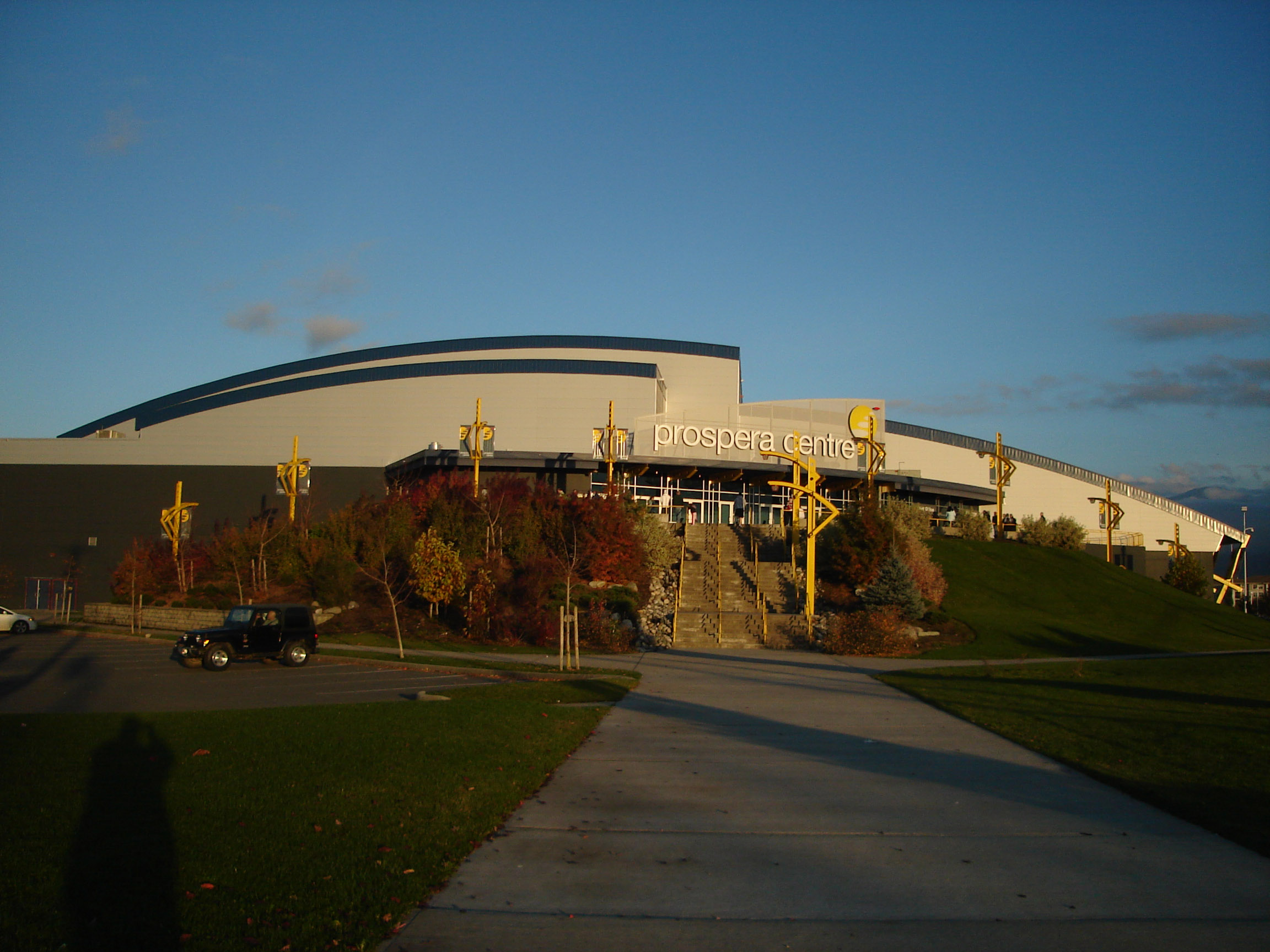
Chilliwack Coliseum in Downtown Chilliwack

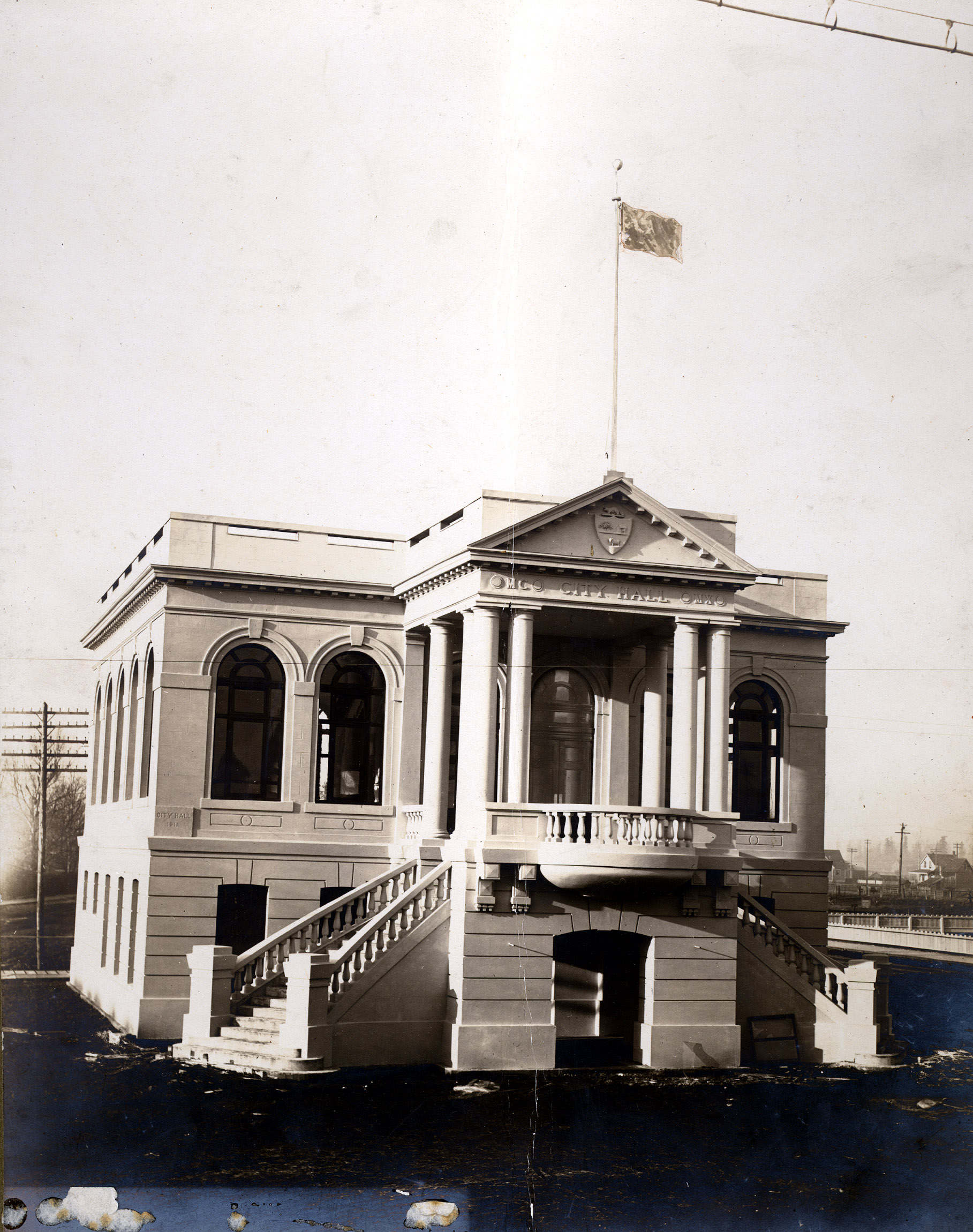
Front view of the newly constructed City of Chilliwack City Hall, 1912

North side, also referred to as Chilliwack Proper, Village West, covers the area from the Trans-Canada Highway in the south, to the Fraser River in the north, and includes the following communities.

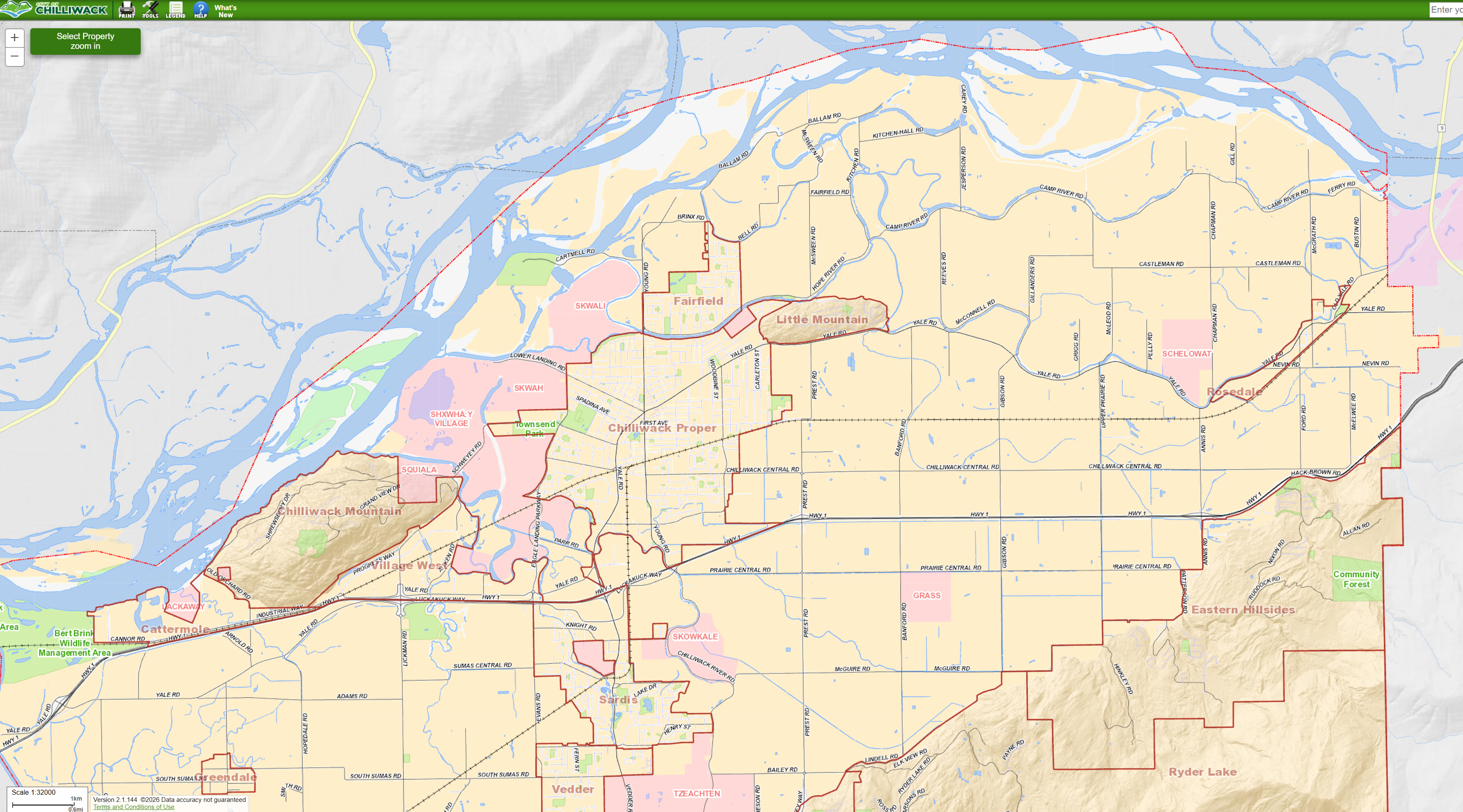
Neighbourhoods of northern Chilliwack.

=== Camp River ===
A picturesque, rural farming community at the North-East extreme of the city on Fairfield Island.

Cheam

=== Downtown Chilliwack ===
Also known as Chilliwack Proper, is the historical urban centre of the city. Several cultural attractions, such as the Chilliwack Coliseum, Chilliwack Cultural Centre and District 1881 are located there, as well as key government buildings, such as City Hall, FVRD offices, and the Provincial Court of British Columbia. The Eagle Landing Shopping Center is located southwest of downtown, between Chilliwack and Sardis.

=== East Chilliwack ===
A rural-suburban community located between Downtown Chillwack to the west, and Rosedale to the east.

=== Fairfield Island ===
A mainly suburban and residential neighbourhood, and the northernmost community within the city boundaries.

=== Rosedale ===
A rural-suburban community in the north-eastern part of the city. This small community is based alongside the Fraser River. It serves as a base for many tourists, both in summer and winter. The hills and valleys of British Columbia are popular for tourists who enjoy outdoor activities such as skiing, snowboarding and dogsledding locations. In summer, rockclimbing and whitewater rafting are the primary activities in the Fraser Valley.

== South side ==
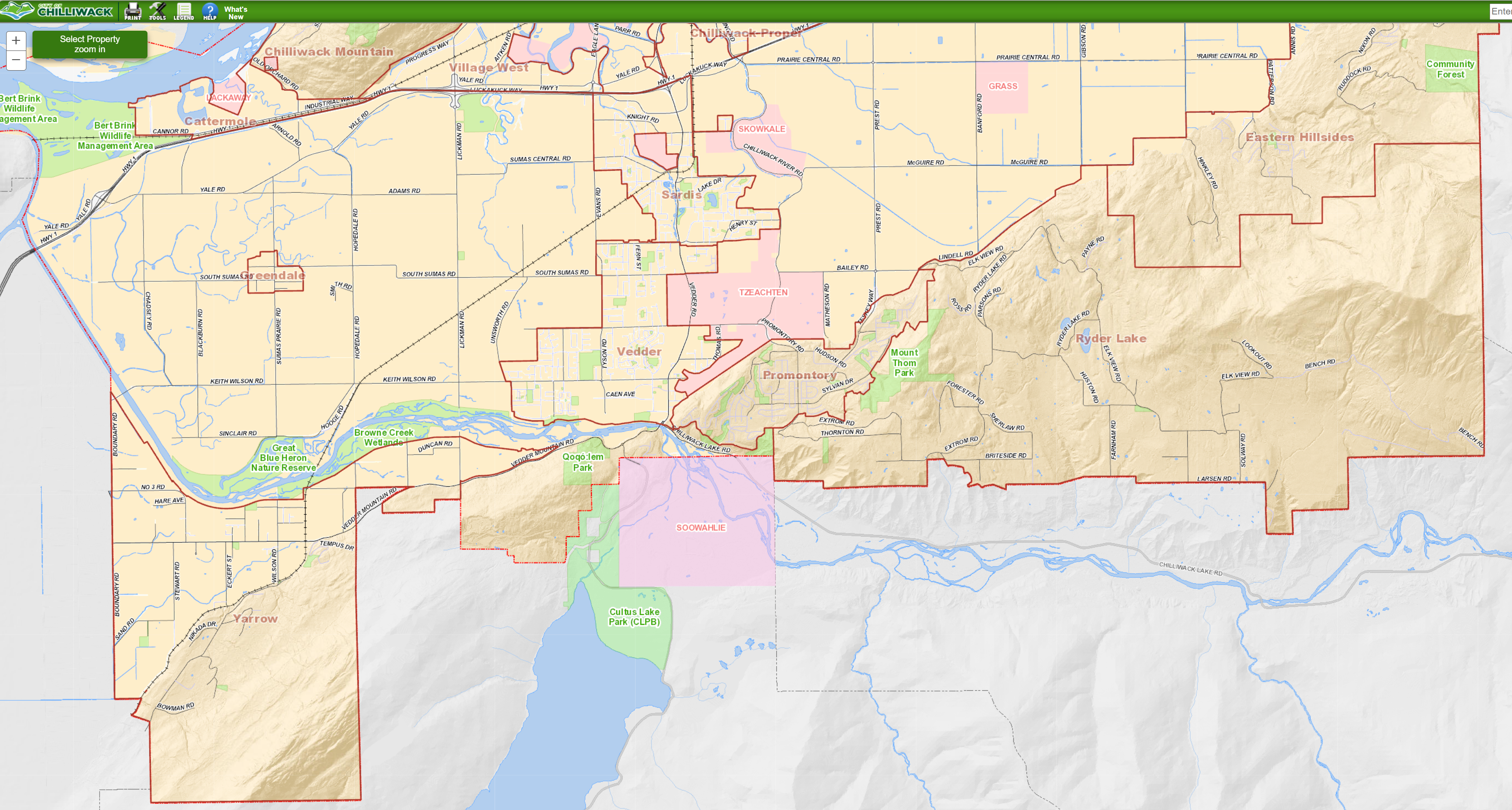
Neighbourhoods of southern Chilliwack.

The south side includes the neighbourhoods of Sardis south of Highway 1, Vedder north of the Vedder River, Promontory, Ryder Lake, Eastern Hillsides, Yarrow, & Greendale.

=== Atchelitz ===
Atchelitz is a rural community within the City of Chilliwack in the Eastern Fraser Valley region of British Columbia, Canada. It is located southwest of the city core, to the north of the Vedder Canal.

Atchelitz Pioneer Village, located within Atchelitz community, is a little antique town operating as a museum, located right next to Tourism Chilliwack and Chilliwack Heritage Museum. It is run entirely by volunteers from Atchelitz Threshermen’s Association. Atchelitz' collectors are mainly focused on collecting and restoring steam and gasoline stationary engines, steam and gasoline tractors and machinery used for farming.

Chilliwack River Valley

Stretching 47 km from Chilliwack Lake to the Vedder Crossing, the valley contains an eclectic mix of homes, vacation properties, campgrounds, industry (logging/mining), and Crown Land. It is increasingly popular as an outdoor recreation destination, featuring hiking, camping, fishing, whitewater sports, off-road motoring, and birding.

Columbia Valley

=== Cultus Lake Park ===
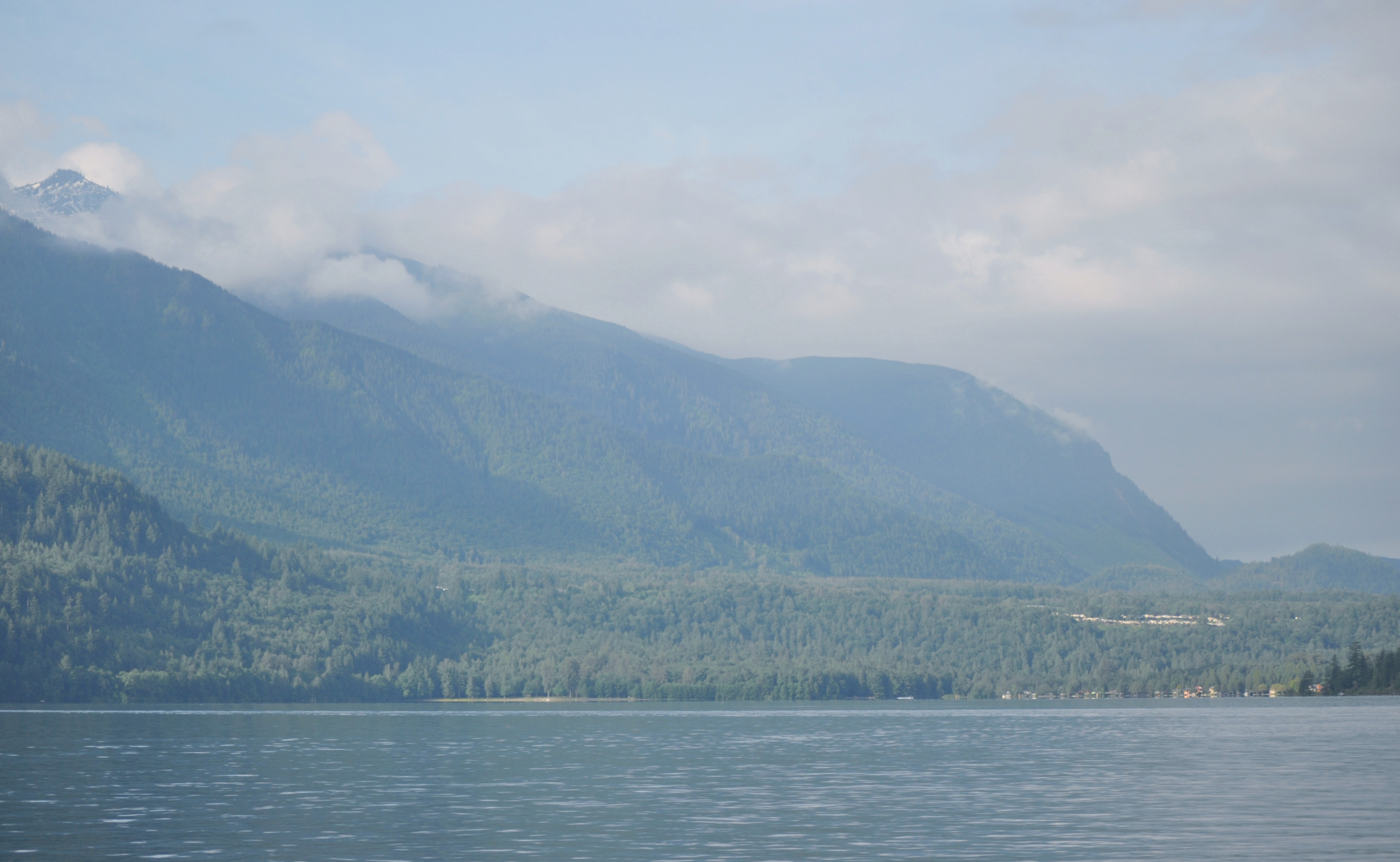
Cultus Lake is a provincial park as well as a self-contained community and popular destination

Cultus Lake is a lake, associated community and provincial park in the Fraser Valley region of British Columbia, Canada. It is the source of the Sweltzer River. Cultus Lake is located 11 kilometres (6.8 mi) south of the Chilliwack River, near the city of Chilliwack and approximately 80 kilometres (50 mi) east of Vancouver. In 1950, Cultus Lake became a provincial park of British Columbia. Cultus Lake covers an area of 656 hectares, evenly on either side of the lake. At one time the lake had a sawmill and booming ground until it became a provincial park in the 1950s.

=== Greendale ===
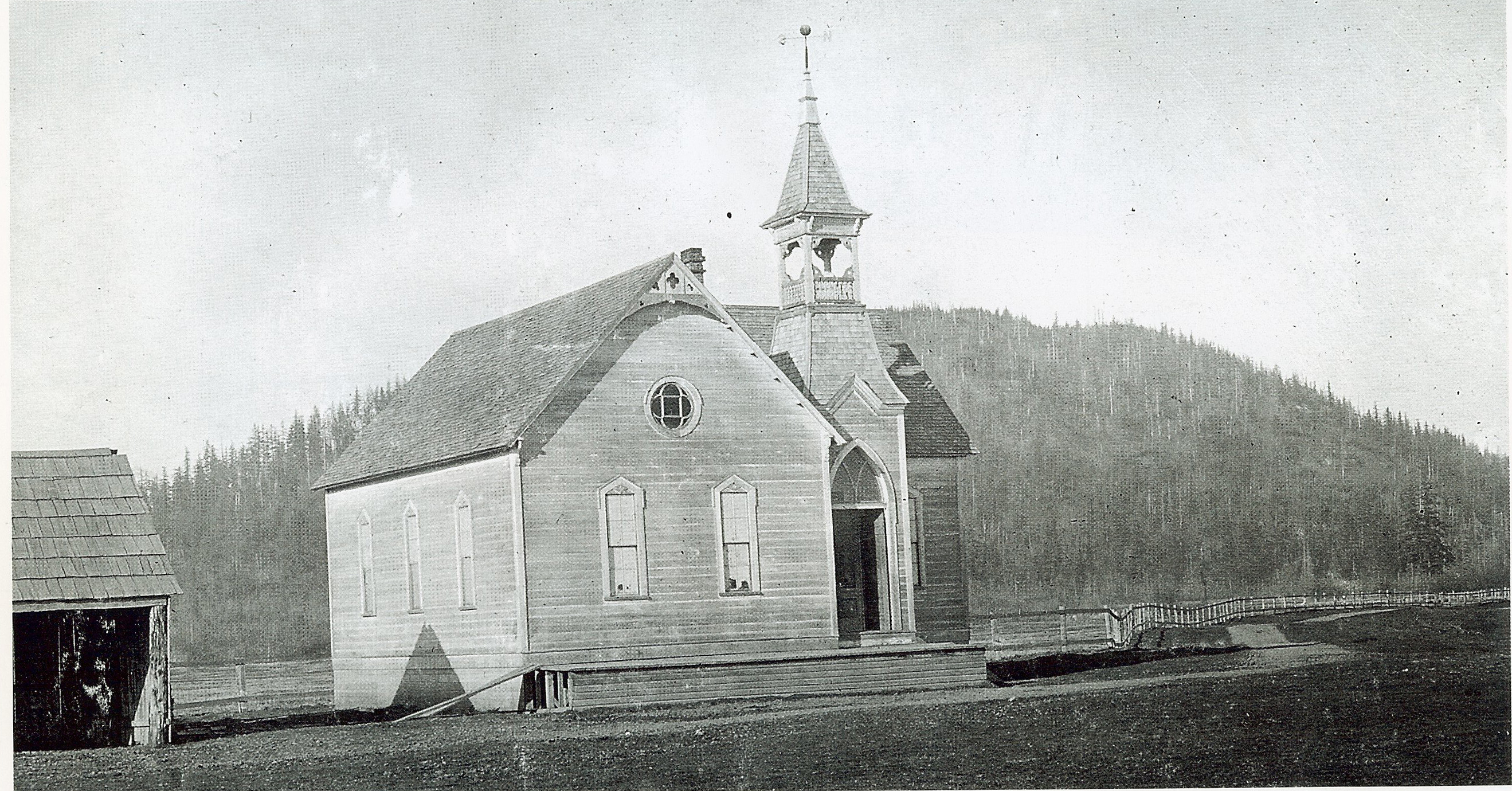
Sumas Methodist Church near Chilliwack before 1900 off Yale Rd in Greendale

Greendale is located on the west side of Chilliwack, bordering the east side of the City of Abbotsford. The Vedder River forms the border between Greendale and Yarrow which lies to the South. Greendale was originally called Sumas, but got renamed in 1951 to avoid confusion with the adjoining municipality, the District of Sumas (now part of the City of Abbotsford), as well as Sumas, Washington. The area was once a 10,000 acres (4,000 ha) lake at the base of Sumas Mountain. Sumas Lake was drained in the early 1920s. Greendale has experienced two major floods, after the completed drainage, in 1894 and 1948.

The Great Blue Heron Nature Reserve is located in Greendale.

=== Popkum (Not considered part of Chilliwack but part of the Fraser Valley) ===
At the eastern extreme of the city limits, and a popular tourist destination and way station for travelers on the Trans-Canada Highway. Attractions include Bridal Veil Falls and The Falls Golf and Country Club.

Promontory

=== Ryder Lake ===
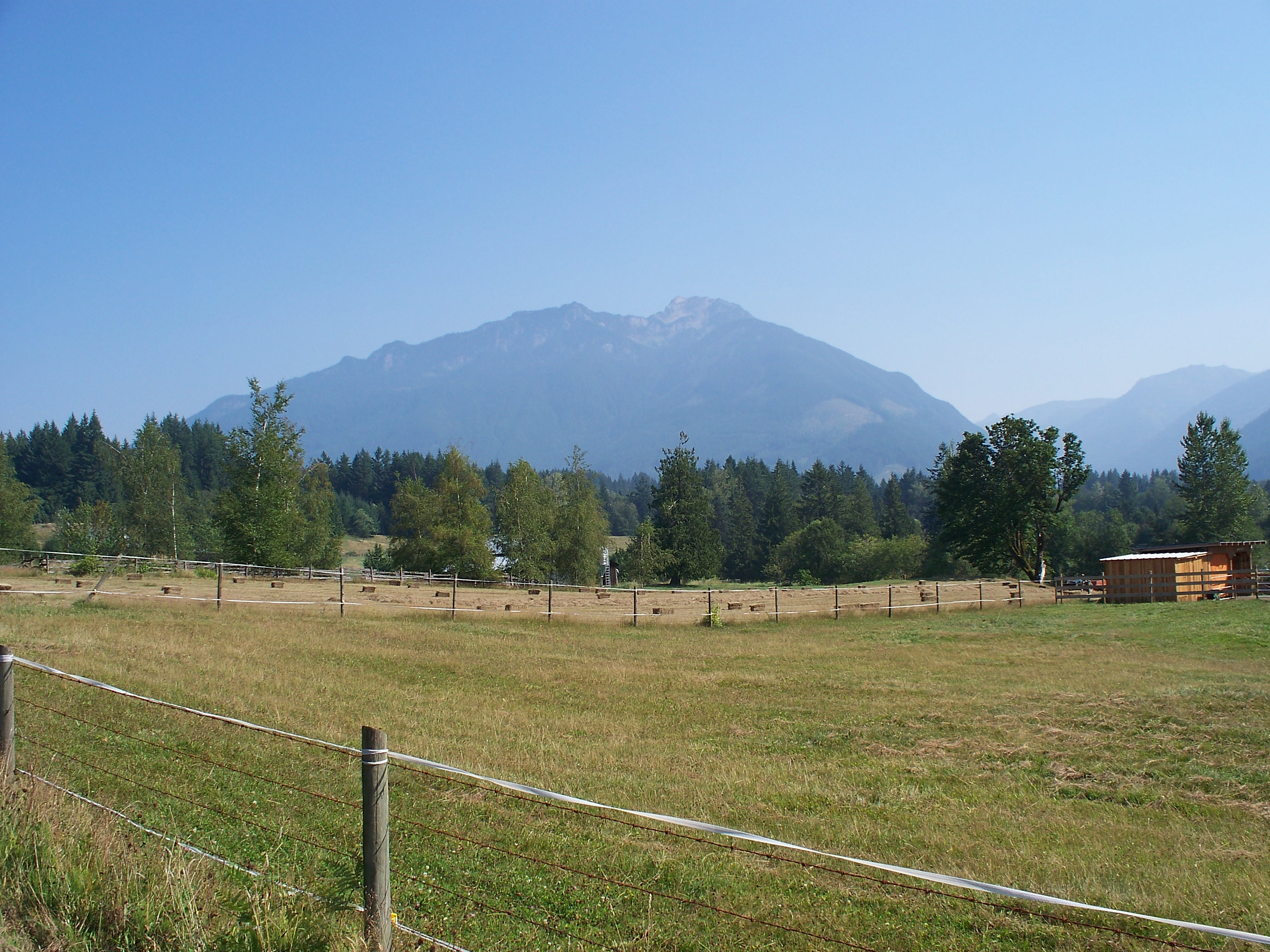
A farm in Ryder Lake

Ryder Lake is a small, sub-alpine, farming-based community located in Chilliwack, British Columbia, situated on Mount Thom to the west of Lookout Ridge. A post office operated here from 1926 to 1940. Notable features in Ryder Lake include a former small elementary school and small fire hall.

The community is located east of Promontory. It is home to a great variety of wildlife and is a popular destination for hiking. The community is named after the lake of the same name. The small lake is situated on private property and cannot be seen from the road because of fencing and trees.

=== Sardis ===
Sardis is the urban core of the south side and a popular shopping destination.

=== Vedder Crossing ===
UFV campus at Canada Education Park in Vedder Crossing

A community on the north bank of the Vedder River, home to the Canada Education Park and the Sardis Sports Complex ice hockey arena.

=== Yarrow ===
The village was first settled by Mennonites in the late 1920s, following the draining of Sumas Lake and the reclamation of the former lake bed for agriculture. It is at the foot of the Skagit Range of the Cascade Mountains on the Vedder River, near the latter's confluence with the Fraser, which traverses the Lower Mainland, of British Columbia. The Lower Mainland Ecoregion is part of the Pacific Maritime Ecozone. The village of Yarrow lies between Vedder Mountain to the south and Sumas Mountain to the northwest. The climate is temperate with most of the precipitation falling in the winter months as rain. The summer is warm and relatively dry. The fertile upper Fraser Valley supports the growth of many varieties of fruit, vegetables and herbs. Yarrow's economy is thus primarily agricultural and includes dairy farms and field crops (blueberries, corn, cole crops and hay).
