= Chilliwack =

- City
- City of Chilliwack
- Flag Seal Logo
- Nickname: The Wack
- Motto: "Cor Viride Provinciae" (Latin) "The Green Heart of the Province"
- Location of Chilliwack within the Fraser Valley

- Location of Chilliwack in British Columbia Chilliwack (Fraser Valley Regional District)
- Coordinates: 49°10′16″N 121°57′09″W
- Country: Canada
- Province: British Columbia
- Regional district: Fraser Valley
- Settled: c. 3,000 BCE
- Incorporated: 1873; 153 years ago
- Amalgamated: 1980; 46 years ago

Government
  - Governing body: Chilliwack City Council
  - Mayor: Jason Lum
  - MP: Mark Strahl (CPC)
  - MLA: Heather Maahs (CPBC); Áʼa:líya Warbus (CPBC)

Area
  - City: 261.34 km^{2} (100.90 sq mi)
- Elevation: 10 m (33 ft)

Population (2021)
  - City: 93,203
  - Estimate (2025): 112,500
  - Rank: 11th
  - Density: 356.6/km^{2} (924/sq mi)
  - Metro: 130,283
  - Metro density: 78.8/km^{2} (204/sq mi)
- Time zone: UTC−07:00 (PCT)
- Forward sortation area: V2P – V2R, V4Z
- Area codes: 604, 778, 236, 672
- Highways: Highway 1 (TCH); Highway 9
- Waterways: Chilliwack River, Vedder River, Fraser River, Hope River
- Website: www.chilliwack.com

Chilliwack (/ˈtʃɪləwæk/ CHIL-ə-wak) is a city in the Canadian province of British Columbia. In 2025, the city had an estimated population of 112,500 residents. Between 2020 and 2025, the city saw steady growth, adding approximately 11,700 residents over this period at a rate of 11.6%. It is located about 100 kilometres (62 mi) east of the City of Vancouver in the Fraser Valley. Chilliwack is 34 kilometres (21 mi) northwest of the Sumas–Huntingdon Border Crossing on the Canada–United States border.

About two-thirds of city land is protected as part of the Agricultural Land Reserve, and agriculture accounts for about thirty percent of the local economy. The city is bounded on the north by the Fraser River and on the south by the Vedder River and Canada–United States border; it is surrounded by tall mountain peaks, such as Mount Cheam and Slesse Mountain.

== Etymology ==
In Halq'eméylem, the language of the Stó:lō communities around Chilliwack and Sardis, Tcil'Qe'uk means 'valley of many streams'. It also lends its name to the Chilliwack River and a group of aboriginal people, the Ts'elxwéyeqw (also spelled Ts'elxwíqw or Sts'elxwíqw). The spelling of Chilliwack is sometimes a matter of confusion. Prior to the amalgamation of the City of Chilliwack and the Municipality of Chilliwhack, there were two different spellings. At the time of the amalgamation, the current spelling of the city's name was adopted. Anglicized spellings include "Chilliwhyeuk" and other versions closer to the original Halq'eméylem.

== History ==
The archeological record shows evidence of Stó:lō people in the Fraser Valley, or S'ólh Téméxw, 10,000 years ago. Permanent structures in the Chilliwack area date from around 5,000 years ago. It is estimated that at the time of the first contact with Europeans, there were as many as 40,000 people living within Stó:lō territory.

=== 19th century ===
In the mid-nineteenth century, thousands of gold miners transited the area en route to the goldfields of the upper Fraser River. By the mid-1860s, settlers had established farms around Codville's Landing, Miller's Landing, Minto Landing, Sumas Landing, and Chilliwack Landing along the Fraser River.

On April 26, 1873, the "Corporation of the Township of Chilliwhack" (note the variant spelling) became the third municipality incorporated by the Province of British Columbia. The town centre at the time was concentrated at Chilliwack Landing along the Fraser River. Steamboats were the main mode of transportation, carrying goods and passengers between Chilliwhack and New Westminster. After the construction of the Canadian Pacific Railway (CPR) in 1885, many residents began to cross the Fraser River at Minto Landing to ride the train from Harrison Mills.

In 1881, with little room for expansion and the threat of floods constantly looming, the town centre was moved south to Five Corners at the junction of the New Westminster–Yale Wagon Road, Wellington Avenue and Young Road. This subdivision was initially named Centreville, but later was renamed Chilliwack, as it was more commonly referred to by locals in 1887. The area would experience catastrophic flooding in 1894, 1935, 1948 and 2021.

On April 20, 1891, Richard Plunkett Cooke, George de Wolf, and Walter E. Graveley established the Chilliwhack Railway Company.

=== Early 20th century ===
On February 20, 1908, the area that was then known as Chilliwack, i.e., the subdivision within the greater Chilliwhack Township, was proclaimed as the City of Chilliwack by letters patent issued by the provincial government under the Chilliwack City Incorporation Act. The City of Chilliwack and the Township of Chilliwhack co-existed as separately administered municipalities until 1980.

On October 4, 1910, the British Columbia Electric Railway began operating regularly scheduled passenger service on the New Westminster–Chilliwack Interurban Line.

In 1941, Camp Chilliwack was established following Canada's entry into the Second World War in 1939. After the outbreak of the Pacific War, the camp was expanded to garrison Canadian Army units for the defence of Canada's West Coast. It continued to be used as a permanent training facility and army garrison during the Cold War. Following the unification of the Canadian Armed Forces in 1968, the base was renamed Canadian Forces Base Chilliwack (CFB Chilliwack). The base housed the following units:

- Canadian Forces Officer Candidate School
- First Combat Engineer Regiment (1CER)
- Canadian Forces School of Military Engineering
- Princess Patricia's Canadian Light Infantry 3rd Battalion (3PPCLI)

=== Late 20th century ===
On January 1, 1980, the Township of Chilliwhack and the City of Chilliwack were amalgamated to form a single municipality styled the District of Chilliwack, following the passage of referendae in both municipalities. On July 16, 1999, the District of Chilliwack, once again, was renamed the City of Chilliwack. To the present day, locals idiosyncratically use the same name to refer to the city as a whole, and to the old city centre. It is also the name of the greater metropolitan area encompassing adjacent sovereign indigenous nations, municipalities, and unincorporated areas.

In 1997, following the end of the Cold War a few years earlier, CFB Chilliwack closed. Its training facilities were converted into the Canada Education Park, a campus for multiple institutions, including the Justice Institute of British Columbia, the Royal Canadian Mounted Police, the University of the Fraser Valley, and the Western Area Training Centre (WATC). Today it also houses supply depots for the 39 Canadian Brigade Group of the Canadian Army and the Royal Canadian Army Cadets. The old quartermaster warehouse became the Canadian Military Education Centre Museum.

== Geography ==
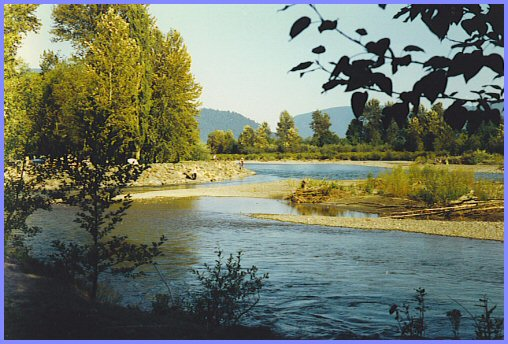
Vedder River Campground near Cultus Lake, located just south of Chilliwack

Chilliwack is located in the Upper Fraser Valley, 100 kilometres (62 mi) east of Vancouver on the Trans-Canada Highway. The city is bounded on the north by the Fraser River and on the south by the Canada–United States border.

Chilliwack is surrounded by tall mountain peaks, such as Mount Cheam and Slesse Mountain, and large rivers (the Fraser and Vedder).

=== Geology ===
The Chilliwack Batholith forms much of the North Cascades in southwestern British Columbia, Canada and the US state of Washington. The geological structure is primarily named after the City of Chilliwack, where it is the most notable geological feature.

The Chilliwack Batholith is part of the Pemberton Volcanic Belt and is the largest mass of exposed intrusive rock in the Cascade Volcanic Arc. The age of the Chilliwack batholith ranges from 26 to 29 million years old.

=== Climate ===
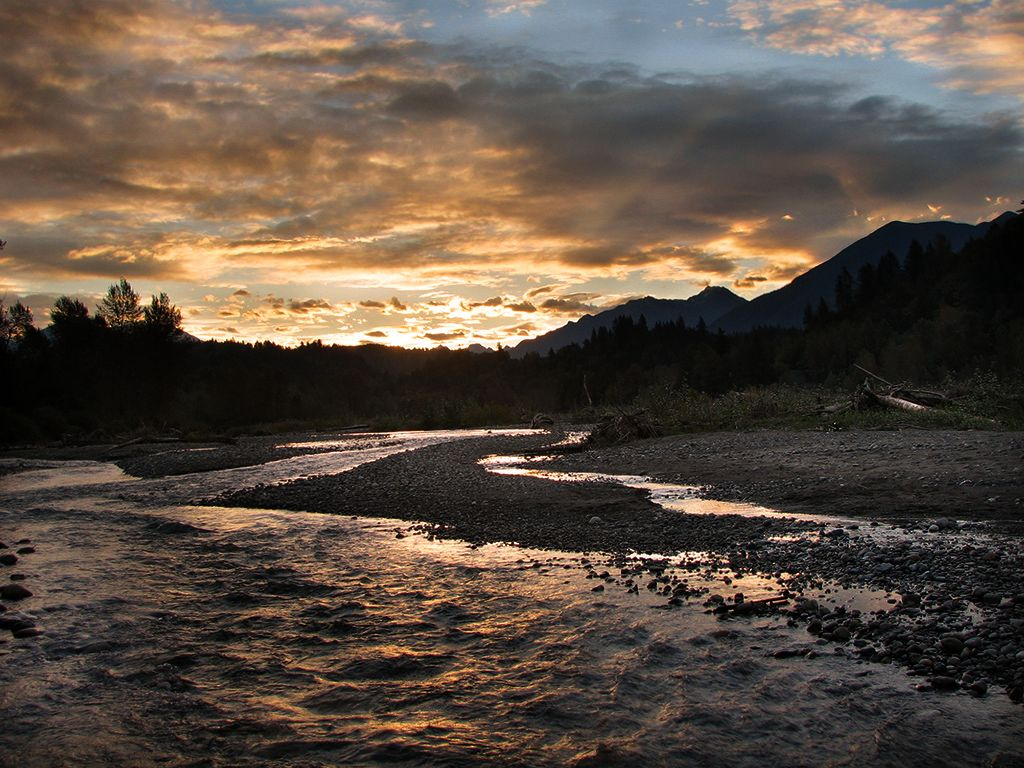
Vedder River

The climate is typical oceanic (Köppen: Cfb) but with some influence of the land mass being some distance from the sea, similar to Orléans, France (although the former has a precipitation more than twice as long and with a tendency towards the Mediterranean pattern). Chilliwack's mild climate with limited extremes provides excellent growing conditions for a wide variety of crops and agricultural products. In fact, when averaged from 1981 to 2010, Chilliwack had one of the warmest mean temperatures for any city in Canada.

The highest temperature recorded within the city of Chilliwack is 43.7 °C (110.7 °F) on June 28, 2021, which was set during the 2021 Western North America Heat wave, beating the old mark of 38.0 °C (100.4 °F) recorded on July 21, 2006. The lowest recorded temperature was −21.7 °C (−7.1 °F) on December 27, 1968. Precipitation falls mostly as rain, with snow limited to the surrounding mountains, except for two or three weeks per year generally in December or January when arctic outflow occurs. In 2013, Maclean's wrongly reported that with an average annual temperature of 10.5 °C (50.9 °F), Chilliwack is the warmest city in Canada. The actual warmest city in Canada is Victoria, with an average annual temperature of 11.2 °C (52.2 °F). Chilliwack enjoys some of the warmest average high temperatures in Canada, with 15.5 °C (59.9 °F) being the yearly average high.

Chilliwack receives nearly the same number of days of precipitation (184.6 days at greater than 0.2 mm) as comparable local communities near Vancouver such as Maple Ridge (185.8 days) and the City of Mission (186.0 days) (Environment Canada Statistics). Summers in Chilliwack are usually sunny and warm, with long days (light out until well after 10 pm in June with dusk that lasts for hours) and with occasional stretches of heat where temperatures rise above 30 °C (86 °F).

Due to its location at the eastern end of the Fraser Valley, there has been some debate about preserving Chilliwack's air quality. However, the 2011 World Health Organization's study of air quality shows that Chilliwack enjoys air quality among the best in the world. For PM_{10} (10 μm) size particulates, Canada averaged third best in the world (along with Australia) at an average of 13 micrograms per cubic metre. The City of Chilliwack and the Greater Vancouver Regional District were tied at a low 8.0 MPCM. For smaller particulate of 2.5 μm size (PM_{2.5}), "the City of Chilliwack averaged 4.9 micrograms per cubic metre. Vancouver also had 4.9, Calgary had 5.6, Winnipeg had 5.6, Toronto had 7.9, Montreal had 11.2 and Sarnia had 12.7."

Climate data for Chilliwack Airport – Cultus Lake, British Columbia
Month	Jan	Feb	Mar	Apr	May	Jun	Jul	Aug	Sep	Oct	Nov	Dec	Year
Record high °C (°F)	18.3 (64.9)	20.6 (69.1)	25.8 (78.4)	32.2 (90.0)	34.5 (94.1)	43.7 (110.7)	38.0 (100.4)	38.2 (100.8)	36.5 (97.7)	27.8 (82.0)	21.1 (70.0)	19.0 (66.2)	43.7 (110.7)
Mean daily maximum °C (°F)	6.1 (43.0)	8.8 (47.8)	11.8 (53.2)	15.8 (60.4)	19.1 (66.4)	21.7 (71.1)	25.0 (77.0)	25.3 (77.5)	22.3 (72.1)	15.3 (59.5)	9.3 (48.7)	6.0 (42.8)	15.5 (59.9)
Daily mean °C (°F)	3.3 (37.9)	4.9 (40.8)	7.3 (45.1)	10.5 (50.9)	13.7 (56.7)	16.4 (61.5)	18.8 (65.8)	18.7 (65.7)	15.7 (60.3)	10.8 (51.4)	6.2 (43.2)	3.3 (37.9)	10.8 (51.4)
Mean daily minimum °C (°F)	0.4 (32.7)	1.0 (33.8)	2.8 (37.0)	5.2 (41.4)	8.2 (46.8)	11.0 (51.8)	12.5 (54.5)	12.1 (53.8)	9.1 (48.4)	6.4 (43.5)	3.1 (37.6)	0.5 (32.9)	6.0 (42.8)
Record low °C (°F)	−20.6 (−5.1)	−16.7 (1.9)	−14.4 (6.1)	−6.1 (21.0)	−1.7 (28.9)	1.1 (34.0)	3.3 (37.9)	2.8 (37.0)	−2.8 (27.0)	−7.2 (19.0)	−14.4 (6.1)	−21.7 (−7.1)	−21.7 (−7.1)
Average precipitation mm (inches)	233.5 (9.19)	125.8 (4.95)	154.7 (6.09)	116.3 (4.58)	93.1 (3.67)	91.7 (3.61)	48.1 (1.89)	56.7 (2.23)	75.2 (2.96)	178.5 (7.03)	283.8 (11.17)	210.1 (8.27)	1,667.5 (65.65)
Average rainfall mm (inches)	206.9 (8.15)	114.7 (4.52)	143.7 (5.66)	115.2 (4.54)	93.1 (3.67)	91.7 (3.61)	48.1 (1.89)	56.7 (2.23)	75.2 (2.96)	178.4 (7.02)	272.7 (10.74)	185.8 (7.31)	1,582.2 (62.29)
Average snowfall cm (inches)	26.6 (10.5)	11.2 (4.4)	11.0 (4.3)	1.1 (0.4)	0.0 (0.0)	0.0 (0.0)	0.0 (0.0)	0.0 (0.0)	0.0 (0.0)	0.1 (0.0)	11.2 (4.4)	24.3 (9.6)	85.3 (33.6)
Average precipitation days (≥ 0.2 mm)	20.6	15.9	19.7	17.5	15.8	14.6	8.7	8.5	9.9	17.1	21.5	20.1	189.9
Average rainy days (≥ 0.2 mm)	18.6	14.6	19.2	17.5	15.8	14.6	8.7	8.5	9.9	17.1	20.9	18.4	183.8
Average snowy days (≥ 0.2 cm)	5.0	2.9	1.9	0.2	0.0	0.0	0.0	0.0	0.0	0.1	2.0	4.8	16.8
Source: Environment Canada

== Cityscape ==
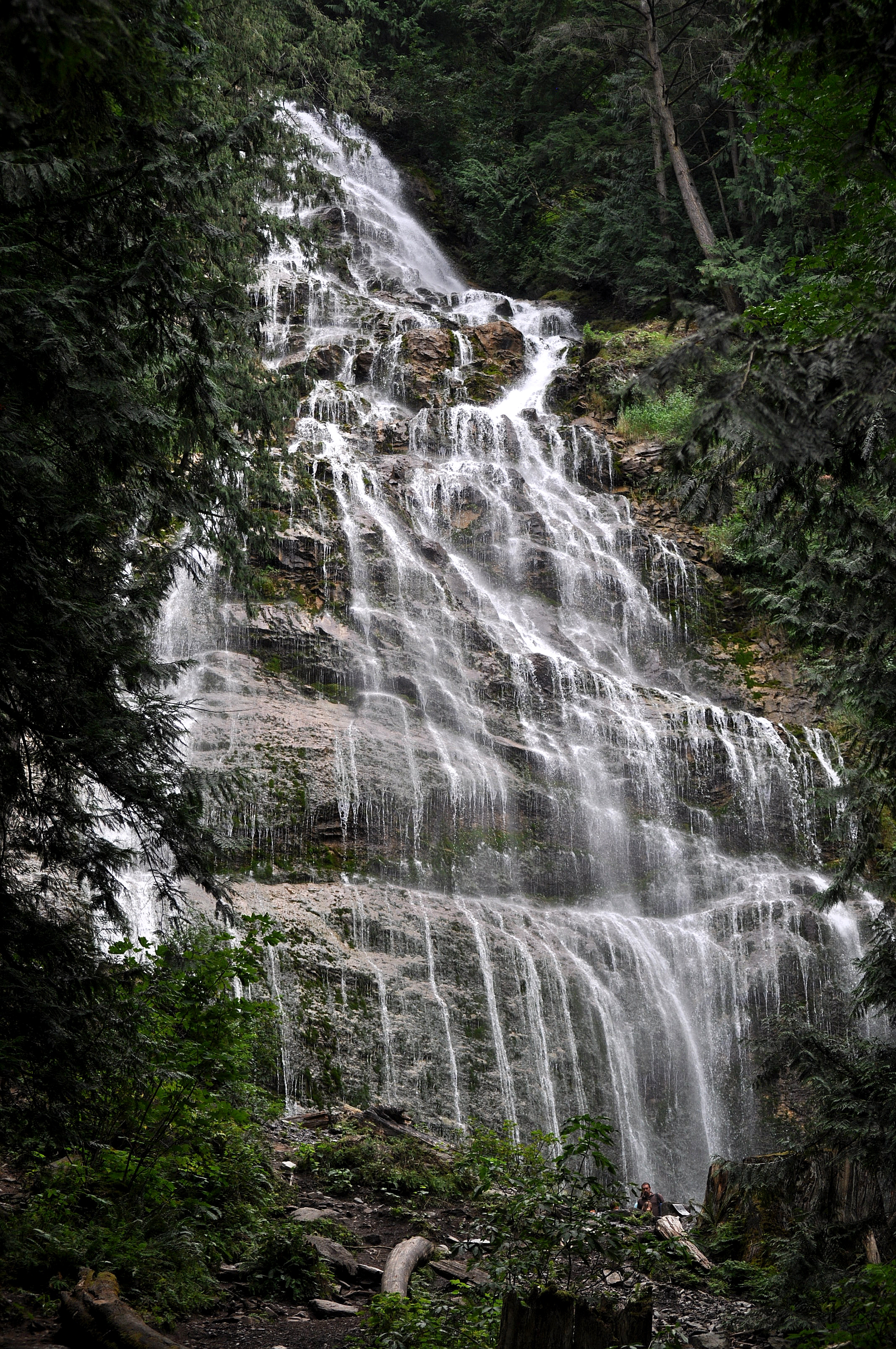
Bridal Veil Falls near the Village of Popkum

The city is made up of several amalgamated villages and communities. The urban core follows a north–south axis bisected by the Trans-Canada Highway. The city is bounded in the north by the Fraser River, in the east by the Eastern Hillsides, in the south by the Canada–US border, and in the west by the Vedder Canal. With 939 farms on approximately 17,322 hectares (42,800 acres) of dedicated farmland, farming remains an important part of the Chilliwack landscape.

=== Neighbourhoods ===
==== Neighbourhoods on the north side ====
Also referred to as Chilliwack Proper Village West, the north side covers the area from the Trans-Canada Highway in the south, to the Fraser River in the north, and includes the communities of Camp River, Chilliwack Mountain, Downtown Chilliwack, East Chilliwack, Fairfield Island, Rosedale and Popkum. Downtown Chilliwack is the historical urban centre of the city. Several cultural attractions, such as the Chilliwack Coliseum, Chilliwack Cultural Centre, The Book Man and the Eagle Landing Shopping Centre are located there, as well as key government buildings, such as city hall, FVRD offices, and the Provincial Court of British Columbia.

==== Neighbourhoods on the south side ====
The south side includes the communities of Atchelitz, Cultus Lake Park, Greendale, Promontory Heights, Ryder Lake, Sardis, Vedder Crossing, Garrison Crossing, and Yarrow. Sardis is the urban core of the south side and is a popular shopping destination.

=== Parks ===
- Bridal Veil Falls Provincial Park
- Cheam Wetlands Regional Park
- Chilliwack Heritage Park
- Chilliwack Lake Provincial Park
- Cultus Lake Provincial Park
- Fairfield Park
- Great Blue Heron Nature Reserve
- Gwynne Vaughn Park
- Island 22
- Salish Park
- Sardis Park
- Townsend Park

== Arts and culture ==
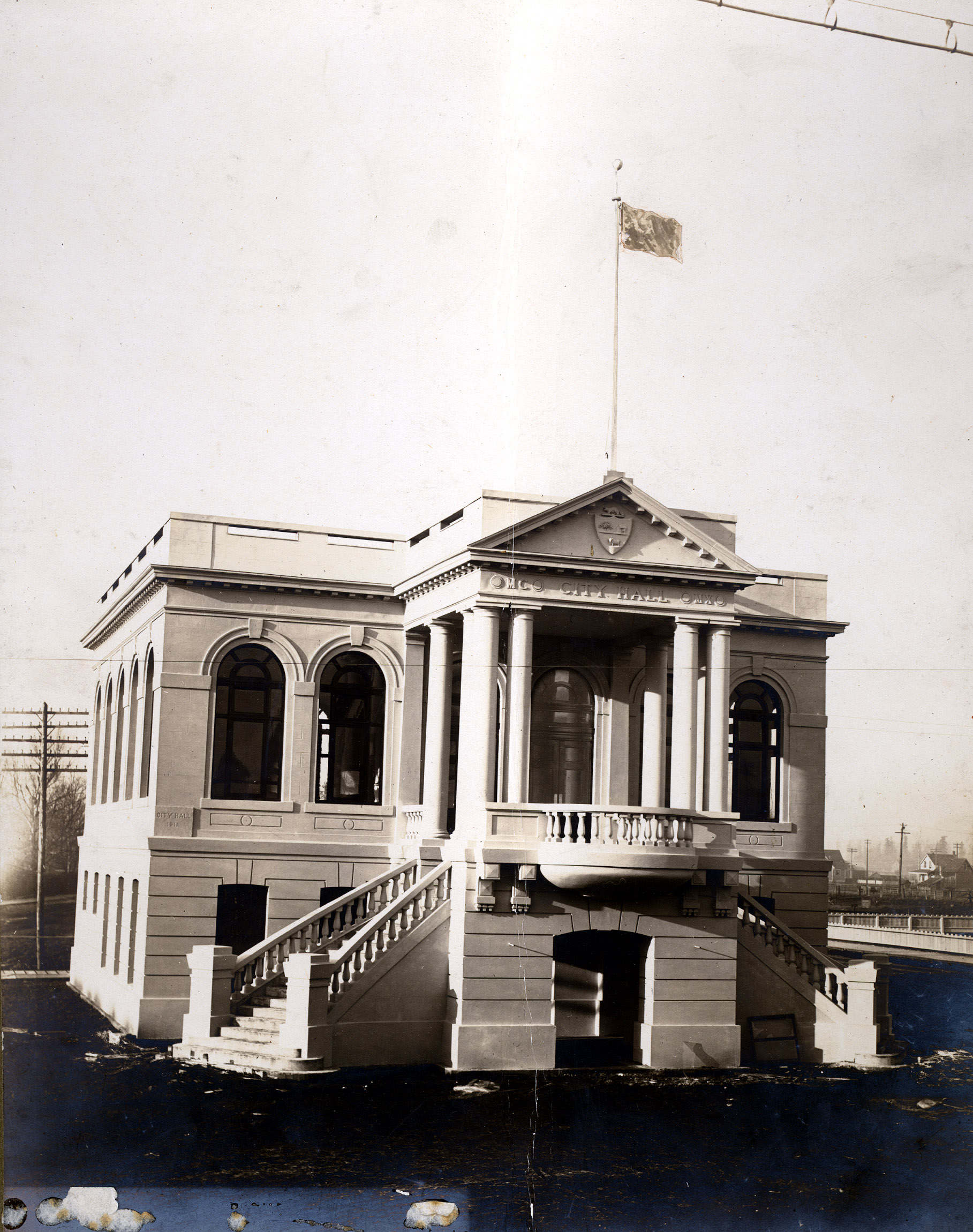
Front view of the newly constructed Chilliwack City Hall in 1912. The building later became the Chilliwack Museum and Historical Society.

=== Music ===
Chilliwack has an active rock music scene, initially centering mostly around young ska and punk rock bands. The modern scene has expanded to genres including metal, grunge, pop punk, emo, and shoegaze. Bands originating in Chilliwack include: These Kids Wear Crowns, Mystery Machine, and the Darkest of the Hillside Thickets.

Chilliwack also has a thriving classical music community, featuring the Chilliwack Symphony Orchestra and the Chilliwack Metropolitan Orchestra.

The drumline from Sardis Secondary School played at several venues during the 2010 Winter Olympics in Vancouver.

Chilliwack also offers many other community events and classes throughout the year. The Downtown Chilliwack Business Improvement Association is hosting music in Central Park on Saturdays for the month of August 2022.

Despite their name, the band Chilliwack was actually formed, and is based, in nearby Vancouver.

=== Performing arts ===
The Chilliwack Cultural Centre is a performing arts venue located in downtown Chilliwack. The building is home to the Chilliwack Players' Guild (the resident theatre company), as well as the Chilliwack Academy of Music.

The UFV Theatre is a 206-seat thrust stage venue formerly belonging to the University of the Fraser Valley (UFV) Theatre Department. Until 2017, UFV produced three or four mainstage shows each year, as well as the annual Directors' Festival, which featured student directors and performers from UFV, Capilano University, Thompson Rivers University, University of Victoria, UBC and Douglas College. As of 2021, the theatre is part of the Imagine High public high school.

The Chilliwack School of Performing Arts provides pre-professional training in acting, singing and dancing to children ages 3 to 18 at their downtown location. The mainstage show performs a two-week run every January at the Chilliwack Cultural Centre, and a Spring Festival featuring performances from many age groups in late May. Programs at the Chilliwack Performing Arts can be registered for at. Many different programs are available, including a Junior Musical Theatre and Summer Break Camps.

=== Public Art ===
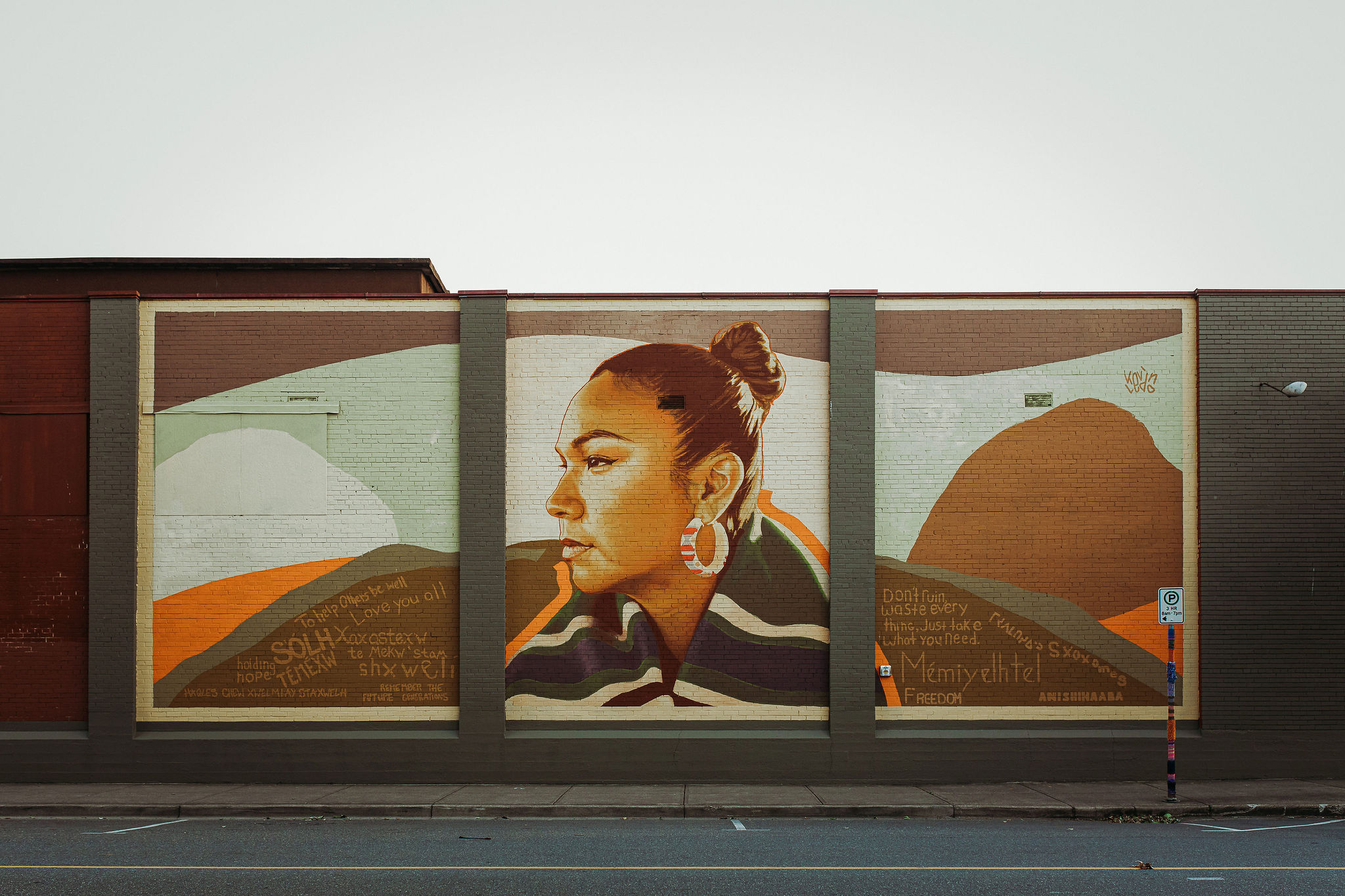
Use Your Voice, Kevin Ledo 2020 for Chilliwack Mural Festival

The Chilliwack Mural Festival occurs annually. Co-founded and directed by Amber Price and Lise Oakley, their volunteer team has curated and directed the installation of over three dozen works of large scale original art in Historic Downtown Chilliwack.

Murals by Canadian Artists Emmanuel Jarus, Jason Botkin and Chris Perez can be found along with other public art via the Chilliwack Public Art Trail.

=== Festivals ===
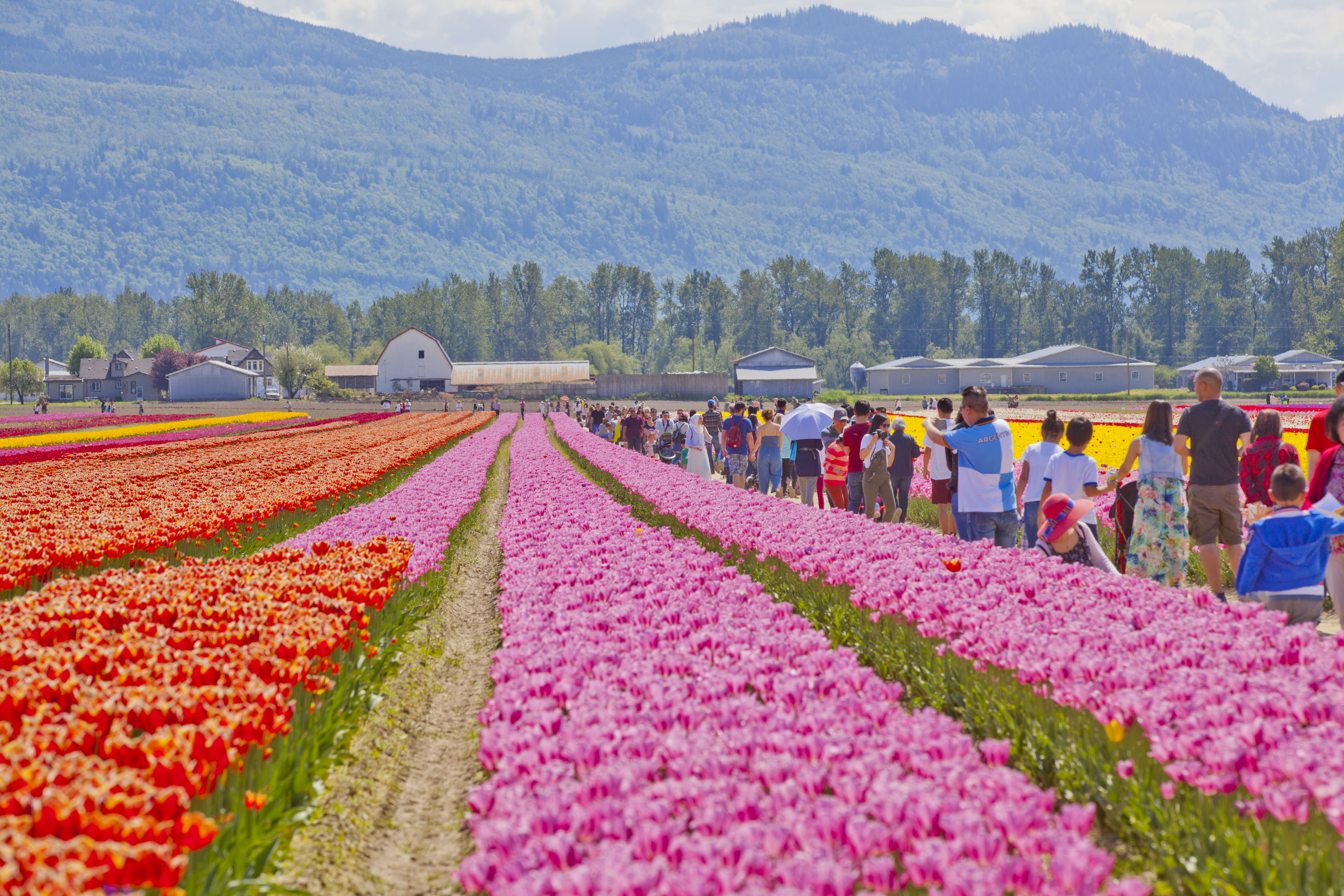
Tulip Festival 2018

Annual events and festivals include:

- Art of Wine Festival
- Canada Day
- Chilliwack Fair
- Chilliwack Flight Fest
- Chilliwack Independent Film Festival
- Christmas Craft Market
- Fraser Valley Culture and Craft Beer Festival
- Garlic Festival
- Lunar New Year
- Mural Festival
- Music and Dance Festival
- Party in the Park
- Pride Festival
- Sunflower Festival
- Tulip Festival
- Yarrow Days

=== Museums ===
- Chilliwack Sports Hall of Fame
- Canadian Military Education Centre
- Chilliwack Museum and Archives, located in the 1912 former Chilliwack City Hall on Spadina Avenue, is a National Historic Site of Canada. The Chilliwack Museum and Archives are a non-profit organization operated by the Chilliwack Museum and Historical Society which began in 1958 by brothers Oliver and Casey Wells.

== Notable people ==
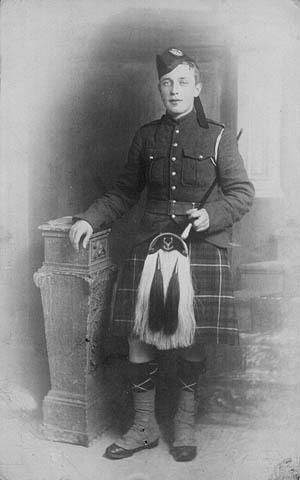
Piper James C. Richardson was awarded the Victoria Cross for gallantry at the Battle of the Somme

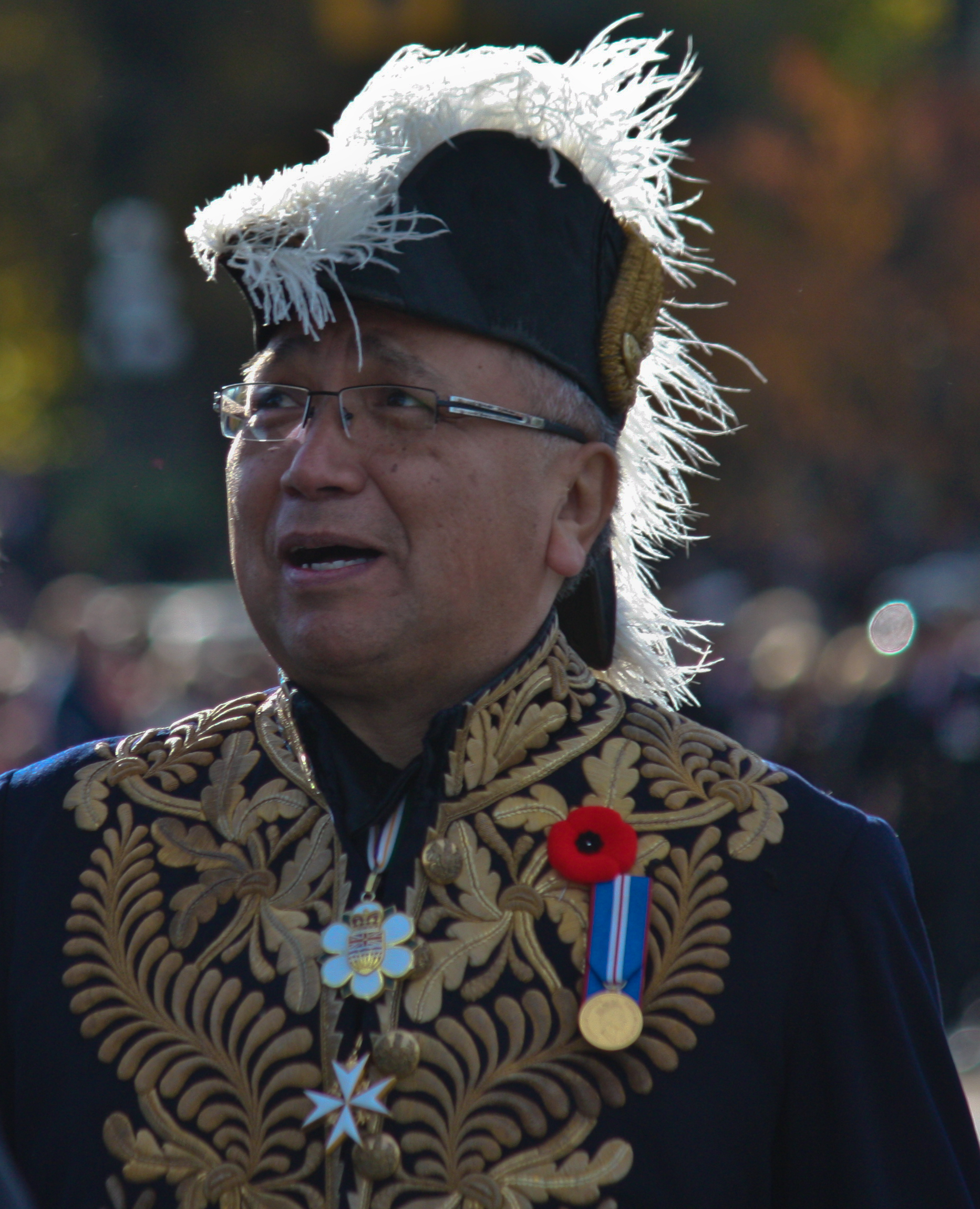
Former lieutenant governor Steven Point hails from Chilliwack

=== Academics ===
- Allan Brooks DSO, Ornithologist and distinguished wildlife artist
- Carin Bondar PhD, biologist, writer, filmmaker, speaker and television personality
- Charlotte Froese Fischer, PhD, mathematician and computer scientist
- Homer Thompson PhD, classical archeologist and excavator of the Ancient Agora of Athens
- Rita Steblin PhD, musicologist in Vancouver and Vienna, Austria
- Wayne Smith MEcon, chief statistician of Canada

=== Activists ===
- Betty Fox, cancer research activist, mother of Terry Fox
- Michael J. Fox OC, actor

=== Athletes ===
- Amber Allen, former professional soccer player with the Vancouver Whitecaps
- Dave Archibald, former professional hockey player with the Minnesota North Stars and Ottawa Senators
- Jordyn Huitema, soccer player for Seattle Reign FC and the Canada national team
- Marc-Andre Leclerc, solo free climber
- Rick Klassen, former professional football player with the BC Lions and Saskatchewan Roughriders
- Zach Benson, professional hockey player with the Buffalo Sabres

=== Arts and entertainment ===
- Bernie Herms, Grammy Award–winning artist
- Bob Random, actor
- Bria Skonberg, jazz musician, Juno Award winner
- Inez Jasper, musician
- Jim Vallance CM, musician, songwriter, composer, arranger and producer
- Patrick Gallagher, actor from Glee, True Blood and Night At The Museum
- Tasha Tilberg, model
- Jackson Howard, musician, bass trombone for Toronto Symphony Orchestra

=== Journalists ===
- Diana Swain, television journalist
- Jack McGaw, journalist and radio operator

=== Jurists ===
- Steven Point KC OC OBC, former lieutenant governor of British Columbia
- Thomas J. Crabtree KC, Supreme Court justice
- William H. Davies KC, Supreme Court justice (1982–1999) and chair of the Davies Commission Inquiry

=== Military ===
- Piper James C. Richardson †, recipient of the Victoria Cross
- Mark Isfeld †, combat engineer and UN peacekeeper killed by a landmine

=== Politicians ===
- Barry Neufeld, former school trustee
- Barry Penner KC MLA, former attorney general of British Columbia
- Chuck Strahl PC, former cabinet minister
- Dorothy Kostrzewa, former city councillor and first Chinese-Canadian woman elected to political office in Canada

=== Writers ===
- Allan Fotheringham, columnist
- Gayle Friesen, novelist
- W.P. Kinsella OC OBC, author of Shoeless Joe

==== Others ====
- Brian Minter CM OBC, horticulturist, author and syndicated columnist
- Keith Hunter Jesperson, serial killer
- Prest Family, one of the pioneer Chilliwack families

== Media ==
=== Newspapers ===
- Chilliwack Progress – British Columbia's oldest community newspaper, published continuously with the same name in the same community since April 1891

Chilliwack Times published its final edition on December 28, 2016.

=== Radio ===
- FM 89.5 – CHWK-FM
- FM 91.7 – CBYF-FM
- FM 98.3 – CKSR-FM
- FM 99.9 – CBU-FM-7
- FM 102.1 – CBUF-FM-1
- FM 107.5 – CKKS-FM

=== Television ===
- Channel 11 – CHAN-TV-1 Global

== Sports ==
Sports clubs in Chilliwack
Team	League	Sport	Venue	Established
Chilliwack Chiefs	BCHL	Ice hockey	Chilliwack Coliseum	2011
Chilliwack Jets	PJHL	Ice hockey	Sardis Sports Complex	2020
Valley Huskers	CJFL	Football	Exhibition Stadium	1999
Chilliwack Crusaders RFC	Third Division	Rugby union	Yarrow Sports Field	2012

=== Football ===
The Canadian Junior Football League club, the Valley Huskers, plays its home games at Exhibition Stadium in Chilliwack.

=== Ice hockey ===
Chilliwack is home to two Junior ice hockey clubs. The Chilliwack Chiefs of the independent British Columbia Hockey League plays its home games at the Chilliwack Coliseum. The Chilliwack Jets of the Pacific Junior Hockey League plays its home games at the Sardis Ice Complex. The Chilliwack Minor Hockey Association was founded in 1958 with the opening of the original Chilliwack Coliseum. The Western Hockey League announced that it planned to establish an expansion franchise in Chilliwack in 2026.

=== Karting ===
Greg Moore Raceway, located on Skwá First Nation, is home to the West Coast Kart Club, the only kart racing club in the Lower Mainland. The facility hosts club and national level karting events, as well as the Pacific Coast Mini Roadracing Club (PCMRC).

=== Trivia ===
- Chilliwack Turbo Fastball club won the 1997 Canadian Jr. Men's National Championships. In 2013 the team was an inaugural induction into the Chilliwack Sports Hall of Fame.
- Chilliwack's minor baseball Cougars were the 2003 Midget AAA Provincial champions as well as the 2006 Western Canadian tier 2 champions. Chilliwack Cougars College Prep Baseball Team won the Provincial Championship in 2016, 2017 and 2019. Most recent title against the Ridge Meadows Royals.
- Sardis Flyers Are a speed skating club based out of Sardis Sports Complex.
- Chilliwack Hawks Field Lacrosse Are a field lacrosse team that play at Stitos Elementary and Middle School.
- Chilliwack Minor Lacrosse Mustangs are a minor league lacrosse team that play at the Sardis Sports Complex.
- Chilliwack hosted the 2007–2008 Synchronized Skating Canadian Championships at the Prospera Centre.

== Demographics ==
=== Metropolitan Area ===
According to the 2021 census, the Chilliwack census metropolitan area (CMA) has a population of 113,767 living in 44,365 of its 46,708 total private dwellings, a change of 12.1% from its 2016 population of 101,512. With a land area of 1,444.02 square kilometres (557.54 sq mi), it has a population density of 78.8/km^{2} (204.1/sq mi).

=== City of Chilliwack ===
According to the 2021 census, the City of Chilliwack has a population of 93,203 living in 35,758 of its 37,124 total private dwellings, a change of 11.2% from its 2016 population of 83,788. With a land area of 261.34 square kilometres (100.90 sq mi), it has a population density of 356.6/km^{2} (923.7/sq mi).

Largest ethnic origin in Chilliwack CMA by census tract based on the 2021 census

==== Ethnicity ====
The most common ethnicities in Chilliwack as per the 2021 census are English (25.1%), Scottish (19.5%), German (18.3%), Irish (15.5%), Canadian (13.2%), Dutch (11.5%), French (8%), Ukrainian (5.4%), and Russian (4.3%).

Largest panethnic group in Chilliwack CMA by census tract based on the 2021 census

Panethnic groups in the City of Chilliwack (2001–2021)
Panethnic group	2021		2016		2011		2006		2001	
Panethnic group	Pop.	%	Pop.	%	Pop.	%	Pop.	%	Pop.	%
European (Note: Statistic includes all persons that did not make up part of a visible minority or an indigenous identity.)	73,865	80.3%	69,810	84.92%	67,210	87.37%	62,205	90.59%	57,020	91.52%
Indigenous	7,255	7.89%	6,585	8.01%	6,030	7.84%	3,400	4.95%	2,550	4.09%
South Asian	3,025	3.29%	1,260	1.53%	715	0.93%	555	0.81%	465	0.75%
Southeast Asian (Note: Statistic includes total responses of "Filipino" and "Southeast Asian" under visible minority section on census.)	2,425	2.64%	1,250	1.52%	855	1.11%	340	0.5%	580	0.93%
East Asian (Note: Statistic includes total responses of "Chinese", "Korean", and "Japanese" under visible minority section on census.)	2,215	2.41%	1,580	1.92%	1,100	1.43%	1,070	1.56%	910	1.46%
Latin American	1,015	1.1%	500	0.61%	370	0.48%	475	0.69%	295	0.47%
African	1,005	1.09%	685	0.83%	325	0.42%	250	0.36%	270	0.43%
Middle Eastern (Note: Statistic includes total responses of "West Asian" and "Arab" under visible minority section on census.)	510	0.55%	200	0.24%	75	0.1%	110	0.16%	65	0.1%
Other/multiracial (Note: Statistic includes total responses of "Visible minority, n.i.e." and "Multiple visible minorities" under visible minority section on census.)	675	0.73%	345	0.42%	245	0.32%	260	0.38%	150	0.24%
Total responses	91,985	98.69%	82,210	98.12%	76,930	98.71%	68,670	99.21%	62,300	99%
Total population	93,203	100%	83,788	100%	77,936	100%	69,217	100%	62,927	100%
Note: Totals greater than 100% due to multiple origin responses

==== Religion ====
Largest non-Christian religion in Chilliwack CMA by census tract based on the 2021 census

According to the 2021 census, religious groups in Chilliwack included:

- Irreligion (45,475 persons or 49.4%)
- Christianity (41,875 persons or 45.5%)
- Sikhism (1,570 persons or 1.7%)
- Islam (750 persons or 0.8%)
- Buddhism (575 persons or 0.6%)
- Hinduism (575 persons or 0.6%)
- Judaism (120 persons or 0.1%)
- Indigenous spirituality (105 persons or 0.1%)

Religious groups in the City of Chilliwack (1991−2021)
Religious group	2021 Canadian census		2011 Canadian census		2001 Canadian census		1991 Canadian census	
Religious group	Pop.	%	Pop.	%	Pop.	%	Pop.	%
Irreligion	45,475	49.44%	32,080	41.7%	18,550	29.78%	11,515	23.46%
Christianity	41,875	45.52%	43,200	56.15%	42,530	68.27%	37,070	75.51%
Sikhism	1,570	1.71%	445	0.58%	235	0.38%	150	0.31%
Islam	750	0.82%	240	0.31%	115	0.18%	70	0.14%
Buddhism	575	0.63%	300	0.39%	385	0.62%	100	0.2%
Hinduism	575	0.63%	30	0.04%	90	0.14%	25	0.05%
Judaism	120	0.13%	110	0.14%	90	0.14%	50	0.1%
Indigenous spirituality	105	0.11%	170	0.22%	105	0.17%	—N/a	—N/a
Other	955	1.04%	355	0.46%	205	0.33%	120	0.24%
Total responses	91,985	98.69%	76,930	98.71%	62,300	99%	49,090	99.11%
Total population	93,203	100%	77,936	100%	62,927	100%	49,531	100%

== Economy ==
Chilliwack is part of the Lower Mainland–Southwest economic region. Chilliwack's service and retail sectors account for approximately 50% of GDP. Other growing industries include manufacturing accounting for 13%, construction at 8% and agriculture and forestry at 5% of Chilliwack's GDP.

Industry	Est. % of GDP
Agriculture and forestry	5%
Construction	8%
Education	6%
Finance, insurance and real estate	11%
Health	6%
Manufacturing	13%
Public administration	9%
Retail/wholesale trade	12%
Technology	6%
Tourism	9%
Other	15%

== Transportation ==
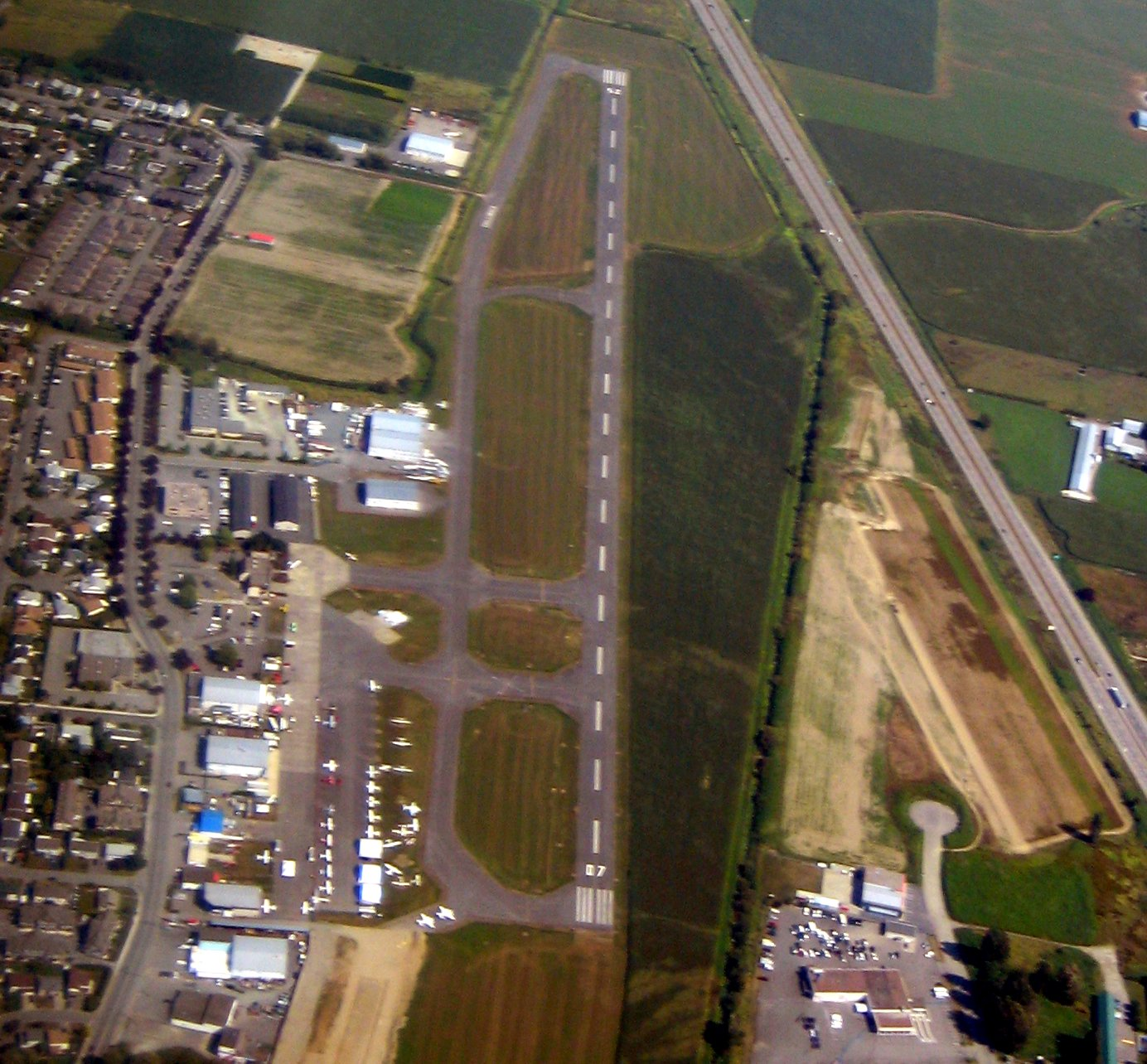
Chilliwack Airport

=== Airports ===
Chilliwack Airport is a small regional airport located in Downtown Chilliwack. It has 1,219 metres (3,999 ft) of paved and lit runway that includes a parallel taxiway. Approximately 70% of the estimated 60,000 annual air traffic movements are itinerant traffic that consists of both pilot training and recreational flights from all around BC and south of the border.

Vancouver International Airport is located about 113 kilometres (70 mi) from downtown Chilliwack and has non-stop flights daily to Asia, Europe, Oceania, the United States, and Mexico, and other airports within Canada. Abbotsford International Airport is located about 42 kilometres (26 mi) west of Downtown Chilliwack and offers scheduled service to Calgary, Edmonton, Toronto and Victoria.

=== Active transportation ===
There are 673 kilometres (418 mi) of active transportation throughout the city, the most per capita of any municipality in the Lower Mainland.

=== Highways ===
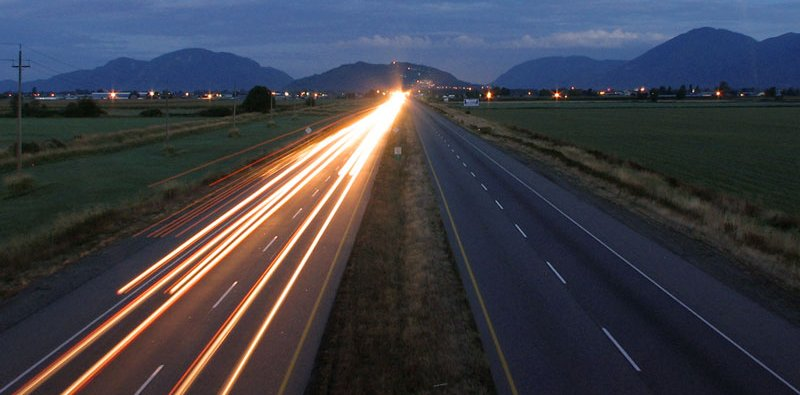
Trans-Canada Highway at dawn in Chilliwack

A four-lane to six-lane expressway from Horseshoe Bay to Hope runs through Chilliwack on the Lower Mainland section of the Trans-Canada Highway.

The Agassiz–Rosedale Highway is a north–south route in the eastern part of Chilliwack that acts as the last connection between Highways 1 and 7 eastbound before Hope, and is the main access to the resort village of Harrison Hot Springs. The highway first opened in 1953, originally going between Yale Road in Rosedale and Highway 7, with a ferry across the Fraser River. A bridge replaced the ferry in 1956. When the section of Highway 1 east of Chilliwack opened in 1961, Highway 9 was extended south to a junction with the new Highway 1 alignment, which replaced Yale Road as the main route between Chilliwack and Hope.

=== Mass transit ===
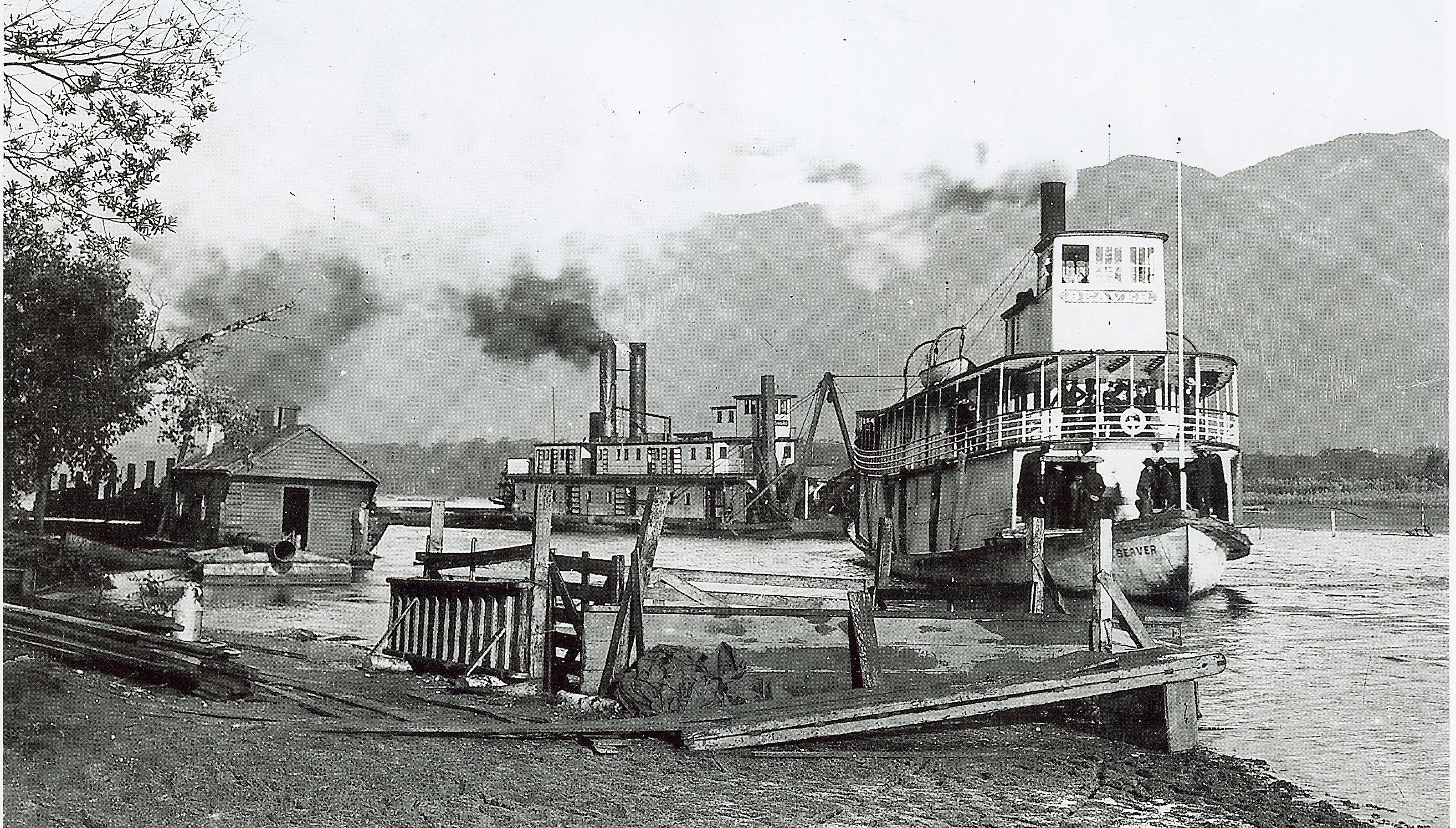
Until the railway and road access were built most travel to Chilliwack was done via paddlewheelers

The Chilliwack/Agassiz-Harrison Transit System consists of a fleet of 9 buses that operate along regularly scheduled routes throughout the metropolitan area. The 51 bus runs along the central Yale/Vedder artery providing transit to and between Downtown Chilliwack and UFV. Cottonwood mall acts as a central location for the bus lines that stray off from the main artery of Chilliwack. These busses include 57/58 from Broadway to Tyson, and 52/54 from Downtown Chilliwack to Promontory.

=== Passenger rail ===
Chilliwack historically was served by the British Columbia Electric Railway (BCER) New Westminster–Chilliwack interurban line. The company announced its "Rails-to-Rubber" conversion programme in 1944, and the Chilliwack line ceased service in 1950.

Chilliwack is served by Via Rail's the Canadian service as a flag stop. The town is only served by westbound trains towards Vancouver. Eastbound trains call at Agassiz, British Columbia, along the CPR tracks, on the other side of the Fraser River. This split in service between Vancouver and Ashcroft is due to CN and CPR utilizing directional running through the Thompson and Fraser Canyons.

In 2019, the South Fraser Community Rail Society was launched by former BC premier Bill Vander Zalm and former mayor of Langley Township Rick Green, to resurrect passenger service using the former BCER right-of-way. The proposed light-rail line would be 103 kilometres (64 mi) long.

Services
- Preceding station	Via Rail	Following station
  Abbotsford toward Vancouver	The Canadian	Hope One-way operation

== Education ==
UFV Campus at Canada Education Park

=== Post-secondary ===
Canada Education Park is an 35-hectare (86-acre) campus in the Vedder Crossing neighbourhood on the south side of Chilliwack that houses several post-secondary institutions, including the University of the Fraser Valley, the RCMP Pacific Region Training Centre, and the Justice Institute of British Columbia.

The University of the Fraser Valley (UFV) is the largest post-secondary school in Chilliwack, and the seventh largest in British Columbia in terms of full-time enrolment. It offers master's degrees, bachelor's degrees, associate degrees, diplomas, certificates and citations across a range of programs in fine arts, humanities, science, social sciences, applied communication, business, nursing, as well as technical and trade programs. Its campuses are located in Abbotsford, Chilliwack, Hope and Mission.

=== Private ===
Independent schools in Chilliwack
School	Level	Grades
Saint Mary's	Elementary	K–7
Unity Christian School	Elementary/secondary	K–12
John Calvin Christian School	Elementary	K–8
Timothy Christian School	Elementary/secondary	K–12
Highroad Academy	Elementary/secondary	K–12
Mount Cheam Christian School	Elementary/secondary	K–12
Chilliwack Adventist Christian School	Elementary / junior secondary	K–7
Cascade Christian School	Elementary / junior secondary	K–12

=== Public ===
Public schools in Chilliwack
School	Level	Grades
Bernard Elementary	Elementary	K–5
Central Elementary Community School	Elementary	K–5
Cheam Elementary	Elementary	K–5
Cultus Lake Elementary	Elementary	K–5
East Chilliwack Elementary	Elementary	K–5
Evans Elementary	Elementary	K–5
F.G. Leary Fine Arts Elementary	Elementary	K–5
Greendale Community Elementary	Elementary	K–5
Little Mountain Elementary	Elementary	K–5
McCammon Traditional Elementary	Elementary	K–5
Promontory Heights Elementary	Elementary	K–5
Robertson Elementary	Elementary	K–5
Rosedale Traditional Community	Elementary / middle	K–8
Sardis Elementary	Elementary	K–5
Stitó:s Lá:lém Totí:lt	Elementary / middle	K–8
Strathcona Elementary	Elementary	K–5
Tyson Elementary	Elementary	K–5
Unsworth Elementary	Elementary	K–5
Vedder Elementary	Elementary	K–5
Watson Elementary	Elementary	K–5
Yarrow Community Elementary	Elementary	K–5
A.D. Rundle Middle	Middle	6–8
Chilliwack Middle	Middle	6–8
Mt. Slesse Middle	Middle	6–8
Rosedale Traditional Community	Middle	6–8
Vedder Middle	Middle	6–8
Chilliwack Secondary	Secondary	9–12
G.W. Graham Secondary School	Secondary	9–12
Imagine High Integrated Arts and Technology Secondary	Secondary	9–12
Sardis Secondary	Secondary	9–12
Education Centre	Alternative	8–12
Fraser Valley Distance Education	Alternative	K–12

The Conseil scolaire francophone de la Colombie-Britannique operates one Francophone school: école La Vérendrye primary school.

== See also ==
- Chilliwack City Council
- Neighbourhoods in Chilliwack
- Chilliwack (band)
- Fraser Valley Regional District (FVRD)

=== Districts ===
- Chilliwack school district
- Chilliwack—Hope federal electoral district
- Chilliwack North provincial electoral district
- Chilliwack-Kent provincial electoral district
