= Prest family =

Family in Chilliwack

William Prest
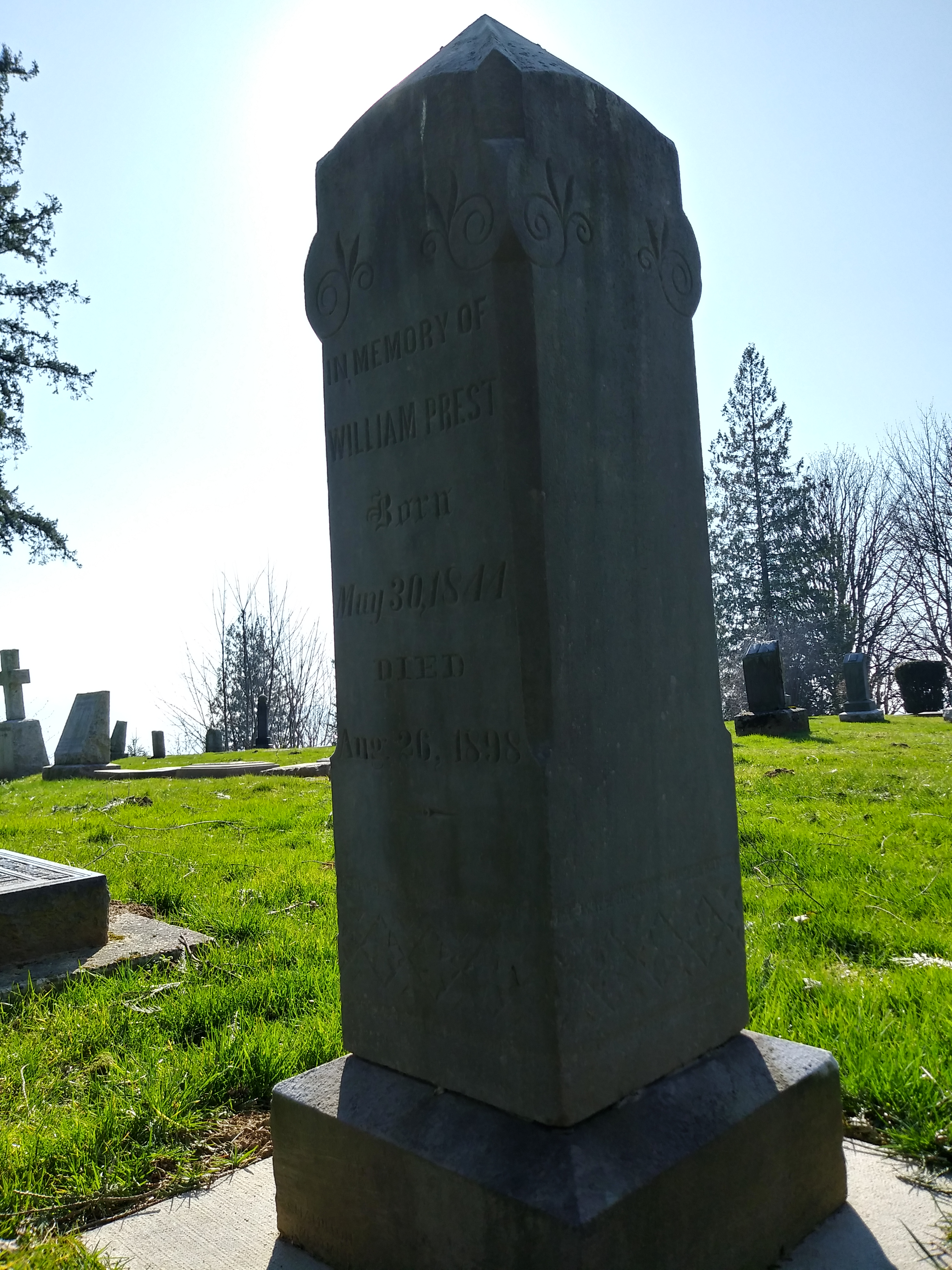
- The gravestone for William Prest in a Chilliwack graveyard on March 20, 2020
- Born: May 30, 1844; Yorkshire, England
- Died: August 26, 1898 (aged 54); Chilliwack, BC
- Occupation: Farmer

William Prest was one of the founding members of the Prest Family of Chilliwack. Their farm was one of the first to farm on the land in Chilliwack. William Prest also married a First Nation woman, Mary "Tata" Benn of what is now Sqwah First Nation, one of the largest communities of Chilliwack's Stó:lō First Nation. From the earliest days of Chilliwack, the Prest Family thus had both settler and First Nation roots. Prest Road, which runs 7.3 kilometres (4.5 mi) south from Yale Road East to Bailey Road, is now one of the most important traffic arteries of Chilliwack and was named after this family.

== Little Mountain Cemetery ==
In the Colony of British Columbia 65 hectares (160 acres) land could be claimed by a settler, cleared, settled and as long as they improved upon it the land would be given to the farmers who initially claimed it. This process was called "pre-empting" the land. The first land in Chilliwack to be pre-empted was in 1862.

Before settling in Chilliwack, William Prest engaged in freighting on the Cariboo road. The Prest family farmed the lots around Little Mountain, Chilliwack. In 1885 they pre-empted 71.6 hectares (177 acres) on the actual mountain which they donated to the Anglican Church as a graveyard in honour of their daughter Susan who was buried there. As part of the donation, the Anglican Church agreed to allow all members of the Prest family to be buried there for free. The Cemetery changed hands so many times and with all the owners this paperwork was lost. Decades of negotiation finally saw the family and the new owners, Chilliwack Cemeteries agree to these terms on September 5, 2018.

== Extended family ==
William Prest and Mary "Tata" Benn had 11 children in total and there are dozens of descendants in the town of Chilliwack and surrounding areas. Some of these family members are:

- William Prest Jr, the son of William Prest, and Robert Allard were killed in a car accident in Vancouver on October 22, 1931.
- Artist Bon Graham-Krulicki is the great-granddaughter of Mary "Tata" Benn Prest.

== Bibliography ==
Notes

References

- Barman, Jean (2017). The West Beyond the West: A History of British Columbia. University of Toronto Press. ISBN 9781487516734. - Total pages: 449
- "Two killed as car overturns". Chilliwack Progress. Chilliwack, British Columbia. October 22, 1931. ISSN 0839-2986. OCLC 1027072966.
- "Other Days In Chilliwack Valley". Chilliwack Progress. Chilliwack, British Columbia. September 1, 1948. ISSN 0839-2986. OCLC 1027072966.
- Feinberg, Jennifer (November 26, 2015). "'It speaks to me' exhibit features local artist". Hope Standard. Hope, BC. ISSN 0841-3606.
- Feinberg, Jennifer (September 7, 2018). "Ancient promise made in Chilliwack to Prest descendants honoured in ink". Chilliwack Progress. Chilliwack, British Columbia: Black Press Media. ISSN 0839-2986. OCLC 1027072966.
