= Fairfield Island, Chilliwack =

Fairfield Island
- Neighbourhood in Chilliwack
- Location of Fairfield Island in British Columbia
- Coordinates: 49°11′39″N 121°55′48″W
- City: Chilliwack
- Province: British Columbia
- Country: Canada
- Settled: 1871

Area
  - Land: 3.45 km^{2} (1.33 sq mi)

Population (2021)
  - Total: 4,105
  - Density: 1,189.9/km^{2} (3,082/sq mi)
- Demonym: Fairfield Islander
- Time zone: UTC-8 (PST)
  - Summer (DST): UTC-7 (PDT)
- Postal code: V2P
- Area code: +1-604; +1-778

Fairfield Island is a residential and rural suburb of Chilliwack, British Columbia with a population of 4,105 residents. Bounded by the Bell Slough and the Fraser River to the north, and the Hope Slough to the south, it is the northernmost neighbourhood in Chilliwack.

== See also ==
- Chilliwack
- Neighbourhoods in Chilliwack
- Rosedale, Chilliwack
