= YCW =

YCW may refer to:

- Young Christian Workers, an international Catholic organization
- Chilliwack Airport, in Canada, IATA airport code YCW
