= William H. Davies =

- Born: June 2, 1931; Chilliwack, British Columbia
- Died: June 3, 2017 (aged 86); Chilliwack
- Occupation: Justice of the Supreme Court of British Columbia
- Known for: Davies Commission Inquiry into the Death of Frank Paul
- Notable work: "Alone and Cold" (2009)

William H. Davies QC Bill Davies, was a Justice of the Supreme Court of British Columbia (BCSC), Canada, from 1982 until his retirement in 1999. In 2007 he was appointed Commissioner of the Davies Commission Inquiry which investigated circumstances around the 1998 death by hypothermia of Frank Paul, a Mi'kmaq homeless man.

== Education ==
He graduating from University of British Columbia Law School in 1955.

== Career ==
He articled with Baker, Newby LLP, then known as Wilson & Hinds Law Office in Chilliwack, where he became a partner in 1956.

In 1978 Davies was appointed as a County Court of New Westminster in 1978, Bill started his new role as a judge.

Davies served as Justice on the Supreme Court of British Columbia from 1982 until his retirement in 1999.

He also served as Justice in the North West Territories.

He retired in 1999.

== Davies Commission Inquiry ==
Justice Davies was called out of retirement to chair the (2007 - 2009) Davies Commission Inquiry into the 1998 death by hypothermia of Frank Paul, a homeless Mi'kmaq man originally from Elsipogtog First Nation, /ɛlzɪˈbʊktʊk/ New Brunswick. According to the report, Paul died of hypothermia in an alley in east side Vancouver where he had been released by Vancouver police. In his 446-page report, Justice Davies was "harshly critical" of the actions of Vancouver Police Department (VPD) in relation to Paul's death. In his May 2011 report, "Alone and Cold: Criminal Justice Branch Response", he questioned the decision "on the part of the crown prosecutors to not proceed with criminal charges against Sergeant Sanderson and Constable Instant in the death of Frank Paul." Davies "ruled that the B.C.'s Criminal Justice Branch needed an overhaul to its conflict-of-interest policies that were brought up during the inquiry" The Inquiry "resulted in the recommendation to establish the Independent Investigations Office which investigates officer-related incidents of death or serious harm in BC."
