= Ryder Lake, Chilliwack =

Ryder Lake T'ept'óp (Halq'eméylem) "where vine maples grow"
- Neighbourhood in Chilliwack
- Location of Ryder Lake in British Columbia
- Coordinates: 49°06′38″N 121°52′41″W
- City: Chilliwack
- Province: British Columbia
- Country: Canada
- Settled: c. 1890
- Founder: John Ferris Ryder
- Time zone: UTC-8 (PST)
  - Summer (DST): UTC-7 (PDT)
- Postal code: V2P
- Area code: +1-604

Ryder Lake is a small, sub-alpine, farming-based community located in Chilliwack, British Columbia, situated on Mount Thom to the west of Lookout Ridge. A post office operated here from 1926 to 1940. Notable features in Ryder Lake include a former small elementary school and small fire hall.

The community is located east of Promontory. It is home to a great variety of wildlife and is a popular destination for hiking. The community is named after the lake of the same name. The small lake is situated on private property and cannot be seen from the road because of fencing and trees.

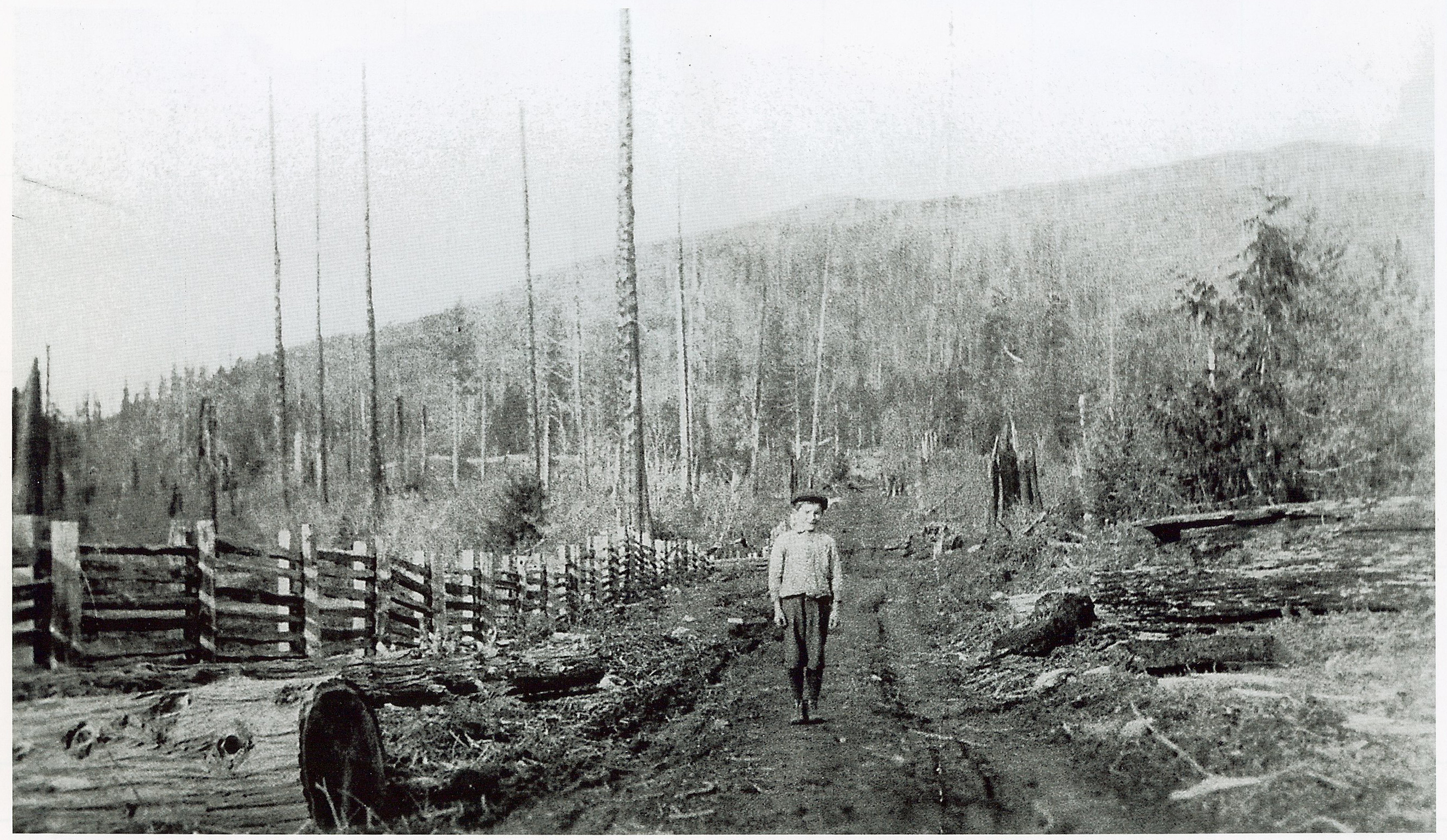
Gene Voight standing on Haley Road Ryder Lake Chilliwack

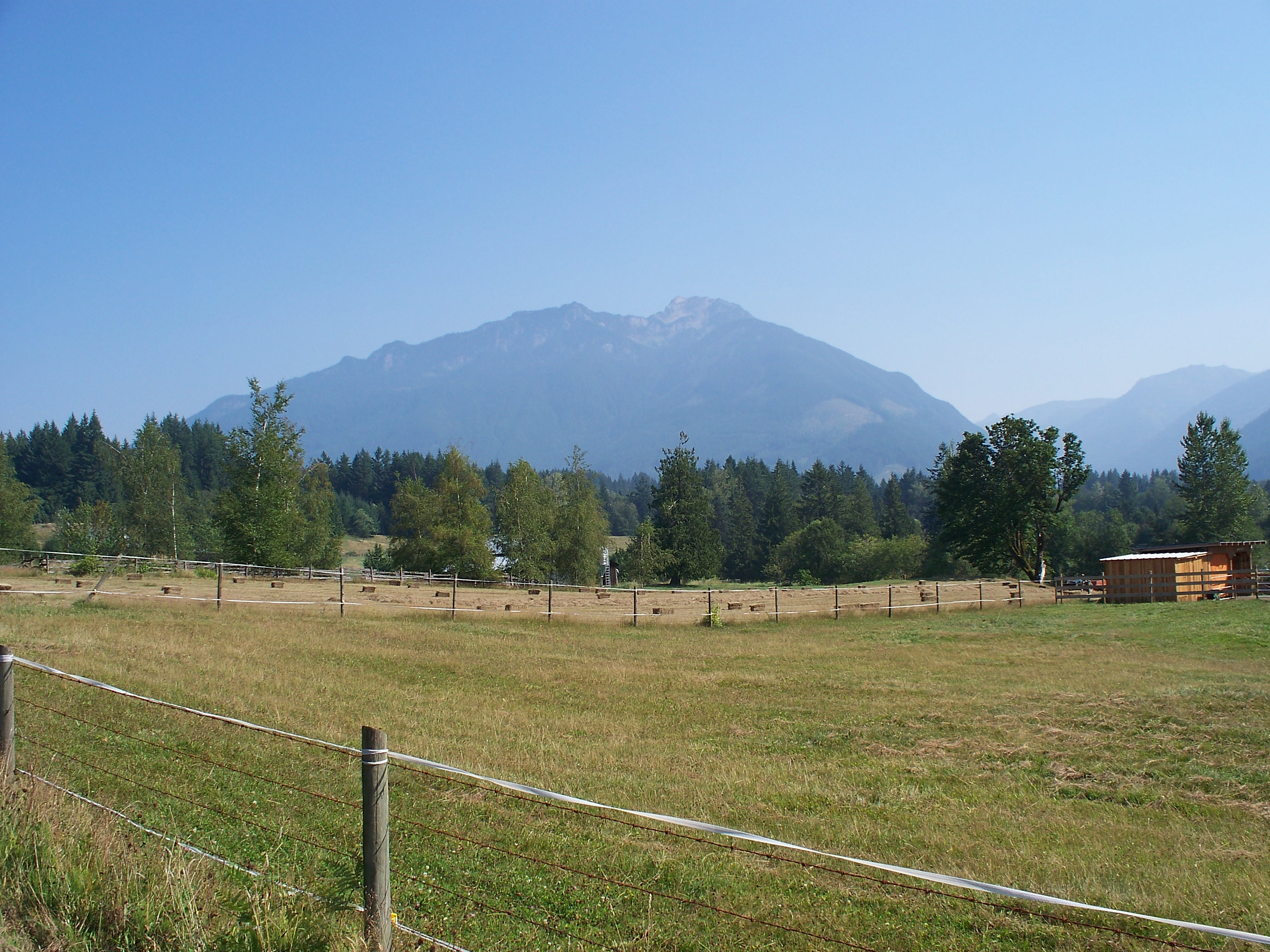
A farm in Ryder Lake
