= Chilliwack Progress =

Canadian newspaper in British Columbia

- Published in the interest of the fertile Chilliwack Valley

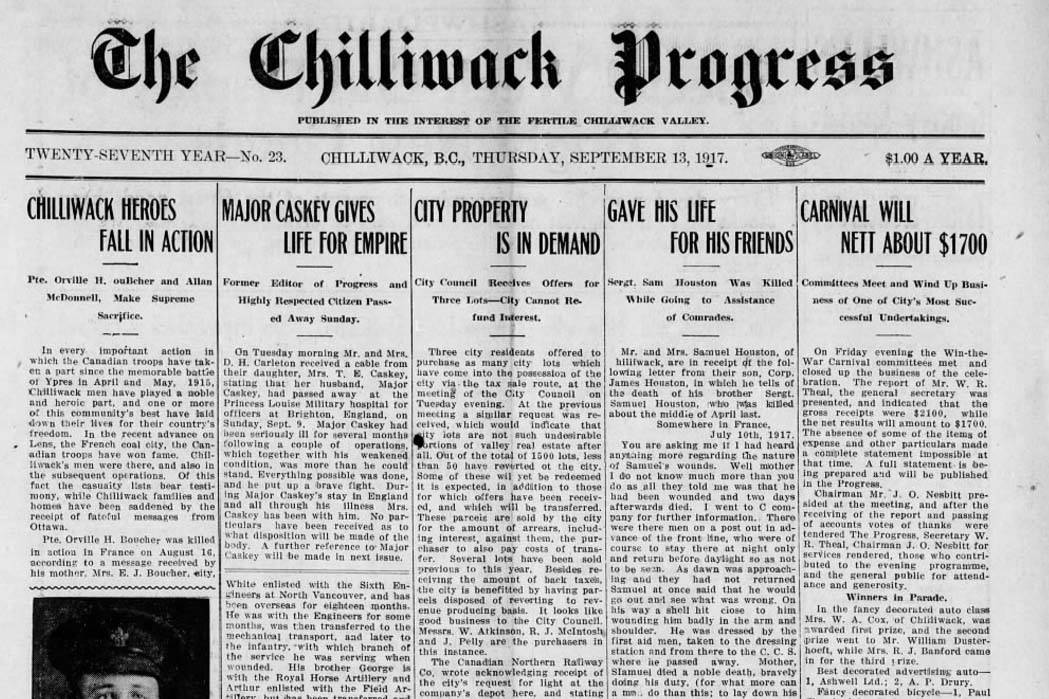
- September 13, 1917 Front Cover
- Type: Weekly newspaper
- Format: Broadsheet
- Owner: Black Press
- Publisher: Tara Hiebert
- Editor: Jessica Peters
- Founded: April 16, 1891; 135 years ago
- Language: English
- City: Chilliwack, British Columbia
- Country: Canada
- Circulation: 16,000 (as of July 2026)
- ISSN: 0839-2986
- OCLC number: 1027072966
- Website: theprogress.com

The Chilliwack Progress is a weekly newspaper in Chilliwack, British Columbia. It publishes Friday and is owned by Black Press.

== History ==
The Chilliwack Progress was first published on April 16, 1891. It remains the longest continuously published newspaper in British Columbia.

Seeing a need for a daily newspaper William Thomas (W.T) Jackman purchased a printing and newspaper press in Toronto and shipped it to Chilliwack. He set up shop at 39 Yale Road East (now 46169 Yale Road East) and published the first edition of the Chilliwack Progress on April 16, 1891. The paper stayed at that location until 1974.

In 2013, several newspapers were swapped between Black Press Media and Glacier Media which resulted in both Chilliwack community newspapers, the Chilliwack Progress and the Chilliwack Times being owned by Black Press. In December of 2016 it was announced that the Chilliwack Times would be consolidated into the Progress with the last edition of the Times published December 26, 2016.

On March 23, 2020, it was announced that due to the COVID-19 pandemic the Chilliwack Progress was moving to one print edition per week.

== Bibliography ==
Notes

References

- The British Columbia Historical Quarterly (1948). "Still in operation at the present time". The British Columbia Historical Quarterly. 12. Archives of British Columbia. ISSN 0706-7666.
- Evans, Tristan (September 19, 2018). "The Chilliwack Progress: Heart of Our Community". Chilliwack Museum and Historical Society.
- Henderson, Paul (March 23, 2020). "Chilliwack Progress temporarily switching to one print edition per week". Chilliwack Progress. Chilliwack, British Columbia. ISSN 0839-2986. OCLC 1027072966.
