= Canada Education Park =

Coordinates: 49°6′11.35″N 121°57′46.05″W

- Established: 2003
- Affiliations: Royal Canadian Mounted Police; Chilliwack Economic Partners Corporation; Justice Institute of British Columbia; University of the Fraser Valley
- Location: Chilliwack, Canada
- Campus: Urban, 85 acres (34 ha)
- Website: http://www.chilliwackeconomicpartners.com/canada-education-park/

Canada Education Park (CEP) is located on the southside of Chilliwack at the former site of the Canadian army base called CFB Chilliwack. It is home to learning institutions including University of the Fraser Valley, Justice Institute of BC, and RCMP Pacific Region Training Centre.

== University of the Fraser Valley ==
The South Chilliwack Campus of the University of the Fraser Valley houses the Trades and Technology Centre, the Faculty of Health Sciences building and the Agriculture Centre of Excellence.

=== Trades and Technology Centre ===
The Trades and Technology Centre opened in 2009 and offers the following programmes.

Degree

- Agriculture & horticulture
- Aircraft structures
- Architectural drafting
- Automotive service
- Autobody collision
- Carpentry
- Culinary arts
- Electrician
- Electronics
- Heavy duty equipment
- Hospitality
- Joinery
- Plumbing & piping
- Welding

Continuing education programmes

- Agriculture & horticulture
- Architecture
- Aviation
- Bicycle frame building
- Bicycle maintenance
- Building Service Worker
- Carpentry and Woodworking
- CFC Recovery Certification
- Commercial Vehicles
- Confined Space Awareness
- Construction Safety Coordinator
- Crane operator
- Culinary Arts
- Electrical Code
- Equine
- Fall Protection Awareness
- Forklift Truck Certification
- Hospitality
- Hydronic System Design
- Jewelry Silversmithing
- Laminate Floor Installation
- Motorcycle Training
- Pesticide Application
- Powerline technician
- Welding
- WHMIS

Apprenticeships

- Auto Service Technician
- Carpenter
- Electrician
- Professional Cook

=== Health Sciences Centre ===
The facility features an atrium, science and computer labs, a fully equipped dental clinic, nursing stations, a library, a bookstore, a canteen, a black box theatre, a human performance lab that includes an EEG lab, environmental chamber, and teaching lab and a First Nations gathering place. Its classrooms have open-source geo-exchange, solar thermal and light harvesting. The building earned LEED Gold certification for green building design, construction, and sustainability. It opened in 2012.

Programmes offered include Bachelor of Kinesiology, Bachelor of Science in Nursing, Practical Nursing, Health Care Assistant, and Certified Dental Assisting program.

=== Agriculture Centre of Excellence ===
Students at the Agriculture Centre of Excellence include those enrolled in the Bachelor of Agriculture and Business Administration in Agriculture Management programmes, as well as several specialized diploma and certificate programmes, including berry production, integrated pest management, and livestock production. The Agriculture Center of Excellence opened in 2012.

== Justice Institute of British Columbia ==
Justice Institute of British Columbia (JIBC) is focused on training professionals in the justice, public safety and social services fields. It was the first post-secondary institution to establish a campus at CEP. It is one of six JIBC campuses and it includes a 102-room student residence.

JIBC offers two four-year degree programmes, namely the Bachelor of Public Safety Administration and Bachelor of Emergency and Security Management Studies (online). It also offers diplomas and applied certificates, and professional workshops and training to paramedics, firefighters, sheriffs, corrections officers, probation officers, peace officers, family justice counsellors, mediators, law enforcement, emergency management and security professionals, Emergency Social Services volunteers and search and rescue volunteers.

== RCMP Pacific Region Training Centre ==
The Royal Canadian Mounted Police opened its Pacific Region Training Centre at CEP in 2001.
