= Highroad Academy =

School in Chilliwack, British Columbia, Canada

Coordinates: 49°09′45″N 121°55′59″W

Information
- Religious affiliation: Christianity
- Established: 1978; 48 years ago
- Grades: K-12
- Website: www.highroadacademy.com

Highroad Academy is a private K–12 Christian school located in Chilliwack, British Columbia, Canada. The school was established in 1978.
