= Brian Minter =

Canadian horticulturist

Brian Minter CM OBC
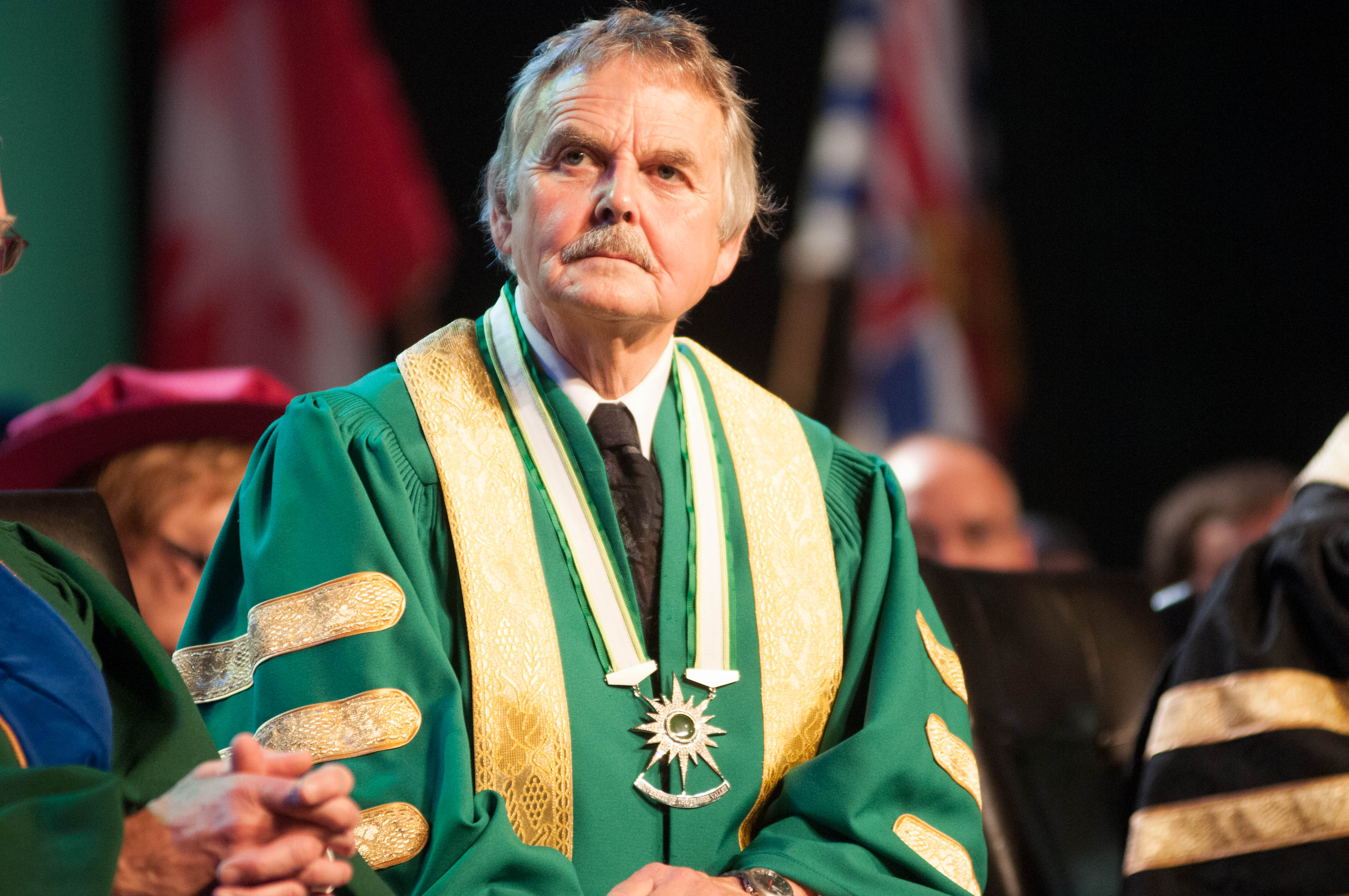
- Born: Brian Earl Minter
- Education: University of British Columbia
- Occupations: Horticulturist; Entrepreneur; Author
- Years active: 1970–present
- Notable work: Brian Minter’s New Gardening Guide
- Spouse: Faye Minter
- Awards: Order of Canada; Order of British Columbia; Q.E. II Golden Jubilee Medal; Q.E. II Diamond Jubilee Medal

Chancellor of the University of the Fraser Valley
- In office 2008–2014

Brian Minter CM OBC is a horticulturist, author and syndicated columnist from Chilliwack, British Columbia Canada. He and his wife, Faye, founded Minter Gardens in 1980, a 32-acre mixed-style show garden. It was described in 1001 Gardens You Must See Before You Die as a “thrilling three-season experience,” and a place that will “dazzle the senses.” In 1998, he published Brian Minter's New Gardening Guide. Minter writes a weekly gardening column for the Vancouver Sun newspaper.

Minter is a Member of the Order of Canada, a recipient of the Queen Elizabeth II Golden and Diamond Jubilee Medals, and the Order of British Columbia, among other awards.
