= Justice Institute of British Columbia =

Post-secondary institution in Canada

Justice Institute of British Columbia (JIBC) is a public, post-secondary educational institution in New Westminster, British Columbia, Canada, that is focused on training professionals in the justice, public safety and social services fields. JIBC also has campuses in Vancouver Island (Langford), Okanagan (Vernon), Chilliwack, Pitt Meadows, and Maple Ridge.

== Programs ==
JIBC offers degrees, diplomas and applied certificates, as well as on-site professional workshops and training, through its 11 divisions:

- School of Public Safety
  - Emergency Management Division
  - Fire & Safety Division
  - Driver Education Centre
- School of Criminal Justice & Security
  - Police Academy
  - Sheriff Academy
  - Justice Institute of British Columbia
    - Motto: Justice Community Safety
    - Type: Public post-secondary institution
    - Established: 1978
    - Academic affiliations: CICan
    - President: Len Goerke
    - Students: 3,283 (2024-25 FTE)
    - Location: New Westminster, Maple Ridge, Pitt Meadows, Chilliwack, Vancouver Island, and Okanagan in British Columbia
    - Campus: Urban
    - Colours: Blue; White
    - Nickname: JIBC
    - Website: www.jibc.ca
    Corrections & Court Services Division
  - Justice & Public Safety Division
- School of Health, Community & Social Justice
  - Centre for Conflict Resolution
  - Centre for Counselling & Community Safety
  - Centre for Leadership
  - Health Sciences Division

The Police Academy is where all municipal police officers in British Columbia receive their basic training, as well as special constables, municipal reserve and BC Royal Canadian Mounted Police (RCMP) Auxiliary Constable. The Academy also offers advanced police training courses, and training for security and gaming officers.

Paramedics, firefighters, sheriffs, corrections officers, probation officers, peace officers, family justice counsellors, mediators, law enforcement, Bylaw Enforcement Officers, emergency management and security professionals, Emergency Social Services volunteers and search and rescue volunteers are also trained by the JIBC. It also offers programs in leadership, conflict resolution and emergency management. Hong Kong Fire Services also used JIBC for additional advanced training for their EMS personnel.

JIBC currently offers two four-year degrees:

- Bachelor of Law Enforcement Studies
- Bachelor of Emergency and Security Management Studies (online)

The Institute collaborates with the Singapore University of Social Sciences (SUSS) on SUSS's Minor in Paramedicine and Emergency Response.

== Awards and scholarships ==
JIBC students can apply for a number of student awards, scholarships, and bursaries. In addition to a general student bursary, students can apply for various external awards and other forms of financial aid.

== See also ==
- List of institutes and colleges in British Columbia
- List of universities in British Columbia
- Education in Canada
- Higher education in British Columbia
