= Chilliwack Cultural Centre =

Performing arts venue in British Columbia, Canada

- Interactive map of Chilliwack Cultural Centre
- Location: 9201 Corbould Street; Chilliwack, British Columbia; V2P 4A6
- Coordinates: 49°10′12″N 121°57′51″W
- Owner: City of Chilliwack
- Capacity: 575 (est.)
- Type: Proscenium theatre

Construction
- Opened: September 25, 2010
- Years active: 2010–present

Tenants
- Chilliwack Academy of Music; Chilliwack Players Guild; Chilliwack Visual Arts Association

Website
- www.chilliwackculturalcentre.ca

The Chilliwack Cultural Centre is a performing arts venue located in downtown Chilliwack, one hour east of Vancouver, British Columbia, Canada. The $22 million cultural facility celebrated its grand opening on September 25, 2010, with a concert by Lisa Howard, Jason Graae, David Burnham, Jessica Hendy, and Scott Coulter.

The facility is located on City-owned land at The Landing, adjacent to existing sports and recreation facilities, as well as the Chilliwack Coliseum, and took two years to build.

== Events ==
In addition to the resident theatre company, the Players Guild, the venue has hosted other concerts and events, including Mickey Rooney, The Rankin Sisters, Nazareth, April Wine and Outerbridge: Magical Moments in Time.
