= Davies Commission Inquiry =

2011 commission of inquiry in British Columbia, Canada

The Davies Commission Inquiry or Davies Commission Inquiry into the Death of Frank Paul (2007 - 2011) was an inquiry under Commissioner William H. Davies QC, a retired Justice of the Supreme Court of British Columbia (BCSC), Canada. The final report was submitted in May 2011.

== Context ==
Davies, who had served on the Supreme Court of British Columbia (BCSC) from 1982 until his retirement in 1999, was called from his retirement to act as Commissioner of the Davies Commission Inquiry in 2007.

The Inquiry focused on the 1998 death by hypothermia of Frank Paul, a homeless Mi'kmaq man originally from Elsipogtog First Nation, /ɛlzɪˈbʊktʊk/ New Brunswick. According to the report, Paul died of hypothermia in an alley in east side Vancouver where he had been released by Vancouver police.

== Interim Report (2009) ==
In his 446-page report, which was published on February 12, 2009, Justice Davies was "harshly critical" of the actions of Vancouver Police Department (VPD) in relation to Paul's death.

== Alone and Cold (2011) ==
In his May 2011 report, "Alone and Cold: Criminal Justice Branch Response", he questioned the decision "on the part of the crown prosecutors to not proceed with criminal charges against Sergeant Sanderson and Constable Instant in the death of Frank Paul." Davies "ruled that the B.C.’s Criminal Justice Branch needed an overhaul to its conflict-of-interest policies that were brought up during the inquiry" The Inquiry "resulted in the recommendation to establish the Independent Investigations Office which investigates officer-related incidents of death or serious harm in BC."

== See also ==
- Saskatoon freezing deaths
- Neil Stonechild
