= Chilliwack Airport =

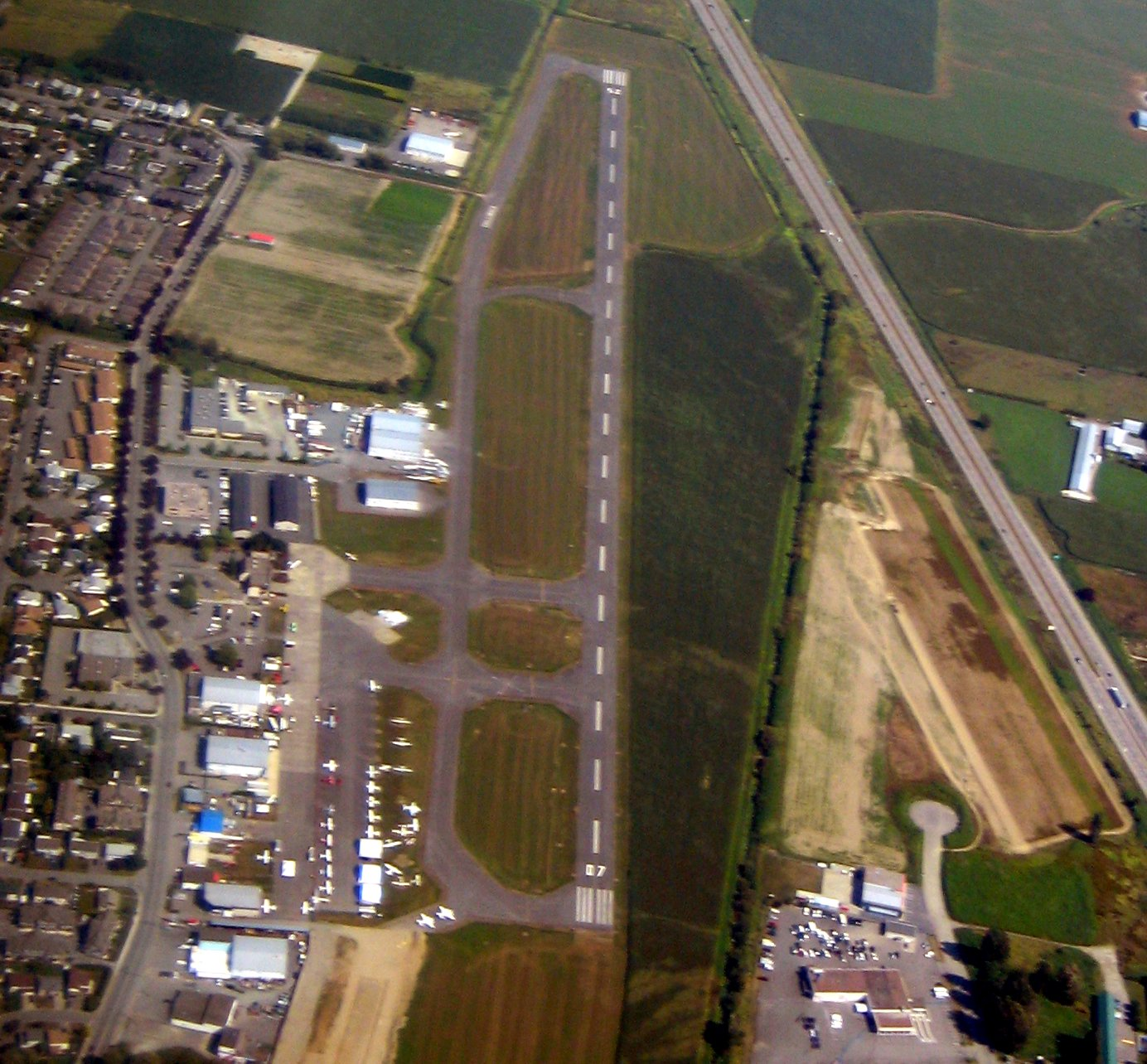
- IATA: YCW; ICAO: CYCW

Summary
- Airport type: Public
- Operator: Magnum Management Inc.
- Location: Chilliwack, British Columbia
- Time zone: MST (UTC−07:00)
- Elevation AMSL: 32 ft (9.8 m)
- Coordinates: 49°09′12″N 121°56′21″W

Map
- Location in British Columbia CYCW (Canada)

Runways
Direction	Length		Surface
Direction	ft	m	Surface
07/25	3,986	1,215	Asphalt
- Sources: Canada Flight Supplement Chilliwack Municipal Website Flight Fest webpage

Chilliwack Airport (IATA: YCW, ICAO: CYCW) is an airport in Chilliwack, British Columbia, Canada. The airport is used by both private pilots and commercial air operators and has services and modification facilities for different types of aircraft.

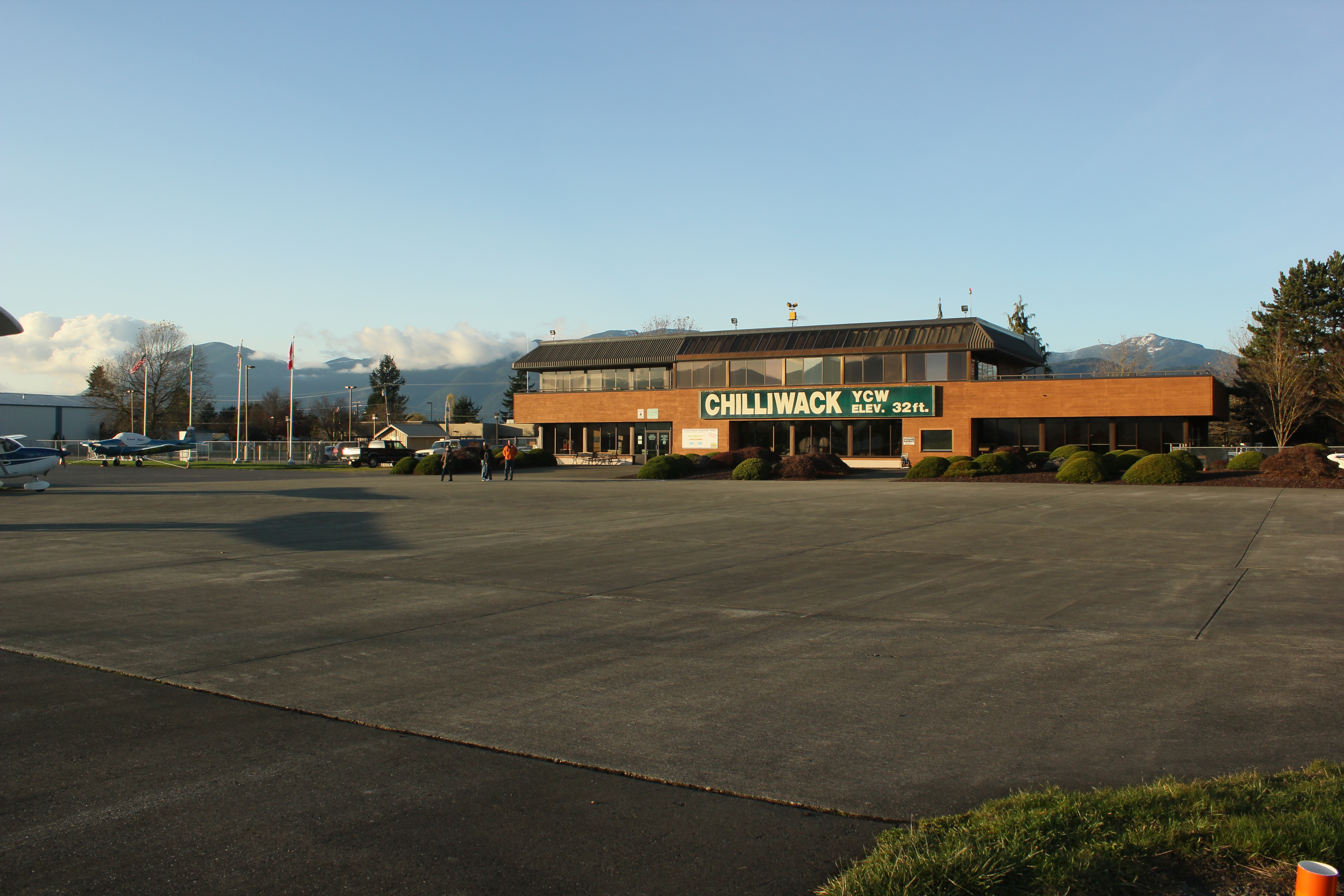
The terminal at Chilliwack seen from airside

== History ==
Chilliwack Airport was established in 1942 during World War II. Initially, it served as a training base for the Royal Canadian Air Force. After the war, the airport transitioned to a civilian role.

== Infrastructure ==
Chilliwack Airport's primary runway, 07/25, is an asphalt strip 3,990 feet (1,219 meters) long, paved, lit, and fitted with LED lighting and has a parallel taxiway. The terminal handles aircraft with up to 19 seats and includes a coffee shop and a 24-hour fueling station offering 100LL Avgas and Jet A. About 20 businesses operate at the airport, including flight training schools, charter companies, and maintenance services such as E.A. Structures, which performs structural repairs. The airport bases roughly 75 private and commercial aircraft, including fixed-wing planes and helicopters, and is used for pilot training, recreational flying, and commercial operations.

=== Airport restaurant ===
The Chilliwack Airport Restaurant at Chilliwack Airport operated sporadically, until it was purchased in the 1970s by Neil and Kathleen McNeill. The restaurant allowed pilots to radio ahead before landing and order a meal, similar to truck stop cafes of that era.

The McNeills sold the coffee shop in 1975, and soon afterward, both the coffee shop and the old terminal building were torn down and replaced with a fully modern terminal building. After remaining closed for several years, Barbara and Gordon Mitchell purchased the airport coffee shop in 1980 renaming it the Chilliwack Airport Restaurant. Canadian Owners and Pilots Association (COPA) granted an honorary pair of pilot's wings to Barbara in 1994 for her pies and "Food for Flying Folk". Jacqueline Dziuba is currently the owner after the Mitchells retired in 2009.

=== Events ===
Every August, the airport hosts an event known as the Chilliwack Flight Fest, a free air show. Aviation enthusiasts are encouraged to fly their own aircraft.

== See also ==
- List of airports in the Lower Mainland
