= Chilliwack Museum and Historical Society =

Museum in British Columbia, Canada

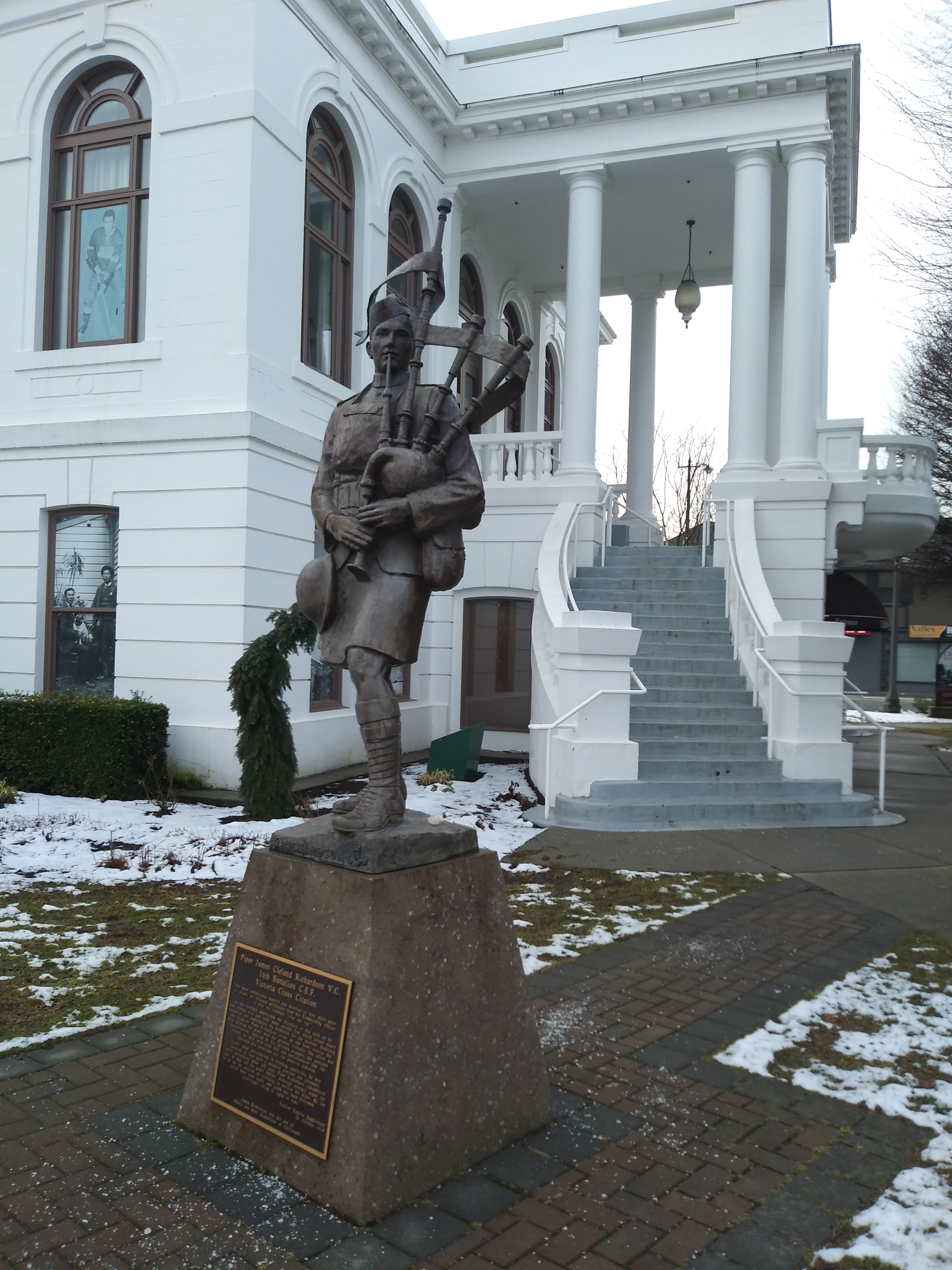
- James Cleland Richardson statue in front of the Chilliwack Museum and Archives
- Established: 1958
- Location: 45820 Spadina Avenue; Chilliwack, British Columbia; V2P 4A6
- Coordinates: 49°10′08″N 121°57′24″W
- Type: History Museum
- Director: Shawna Maurice
- Website: www.chilliwackmuseum.ca

The Chilliwack Museum and Historical Society is a registered non-profit society that operates the Chilliwack Museum and Archives located in Chilliwack, British Columbia, Canada.

== Location ==
The Chilliwack Museum and Historical Society operates two sites in Downtown Chilliwack. The Chilliwack Museum is located at 45820 Spadina Avenue within the former Chilliwack City Hall, a National Historic Site of Canada. The Museum houses the Society's main exhibition galleries and historic programming spaces. The Society also operates the Chilliwack Archives Research Centre at Evergreen Hall, located at 9291 Corbould Street, which possesses climate controlled storage for the Society's archival and artifact collections.

== History ==
The community of Chilliwack first considered developing a museum in 1956, as a project to celebrate the town's centennial year, 1958. Residents whose ancestors were pioneers in the area, including Judge Allan Guinet, Oliver Wells, Earl McLeod, Mary Hickman, E.H. Patriquin, took the lead.

The first museum in Chilliwack opened in March 1958 by the trustees of the Chilliwack Historical Society, and was housed in a room provided by Chilliwack city council in the police building on Nowell Street North.

In 1960 the museum was moved to a room in the local library. In 1971 another centennial celebration led to the museum moving into Evergreen Hall; it was renamed the Wells Centennial Museum.

In 1981 the Society was granted use of the former City Hall building on Spadina Avenue. The museum exhibits and administrative operations began to operate out of the new site, while the archives and collections continued to be based out of Evergreen Hall. The archives were expanded in 2011 to Evergreen Hall which doubled the amount of storage space for the archive and object collections.

In 2013 the archives received a donation of about 400,000 photographs and negatives taken between 1948 and 2006 by a local photographic business. The museum also provided bus tours during the Chilliwack High School reunion.

In 2014 the museum provided resources for and helped to develop a local history effort, the Chilliwack Poppy Project. That year the museum grounds were the site of an anti-abortion protest, which spilled over to the nearby Cenotaph.

== Regular activities ==
The Chilliwack Museum and Archives offers heritage and cultural-based programming throughout the year, including classroom and museum-based programming for K-12 school groups, monthly Archives tours and outreach activities. The Museum location houses permanent and temporary exhibitions centred on Chilliwack history. The Chilliwack Museum and Archives website hosts numerous online exhibitions, and developed the Chilliwack's Chinatowns: A Story of Diversity, Racism and Arson online exhibition, an exhibition based on the book Chilliwack's Chinatowns by Dr. Chad Reimer in 2019. The exhibition is hosted by the Virtual Museum of Canada.

The Society acquires, preserves and maintains local archival records and object collections of relevance to the Chilliwack area and provides access to the collections for researchers and the public. Collections are also searchable online through the Chilliwack Museum and Archives PastPerfect Museum Software database, which has been online since 2007. The Museum and Archives delivers local research services, publishes community history books and provides consultation and contributions to local heritage and cultural projects.

== Operation ==
The Chilliwack Museum and Archives is governed and operated by the Chilliwack Museum and Historical Society, a registered not-for-profit Society. The Executive Director oversees the work of four full-time and three part-time staff members in addition to approximately 20 volunteers. The Society is a member of the British Columbia Museums Association, the Archives Association of British Columbia and the Canadian Museums Association. The Chilliwack Museum and Historical Society receives funding from federal, provincial and municipal governments.
