= Yarrow, British Columbia =

Yarrow
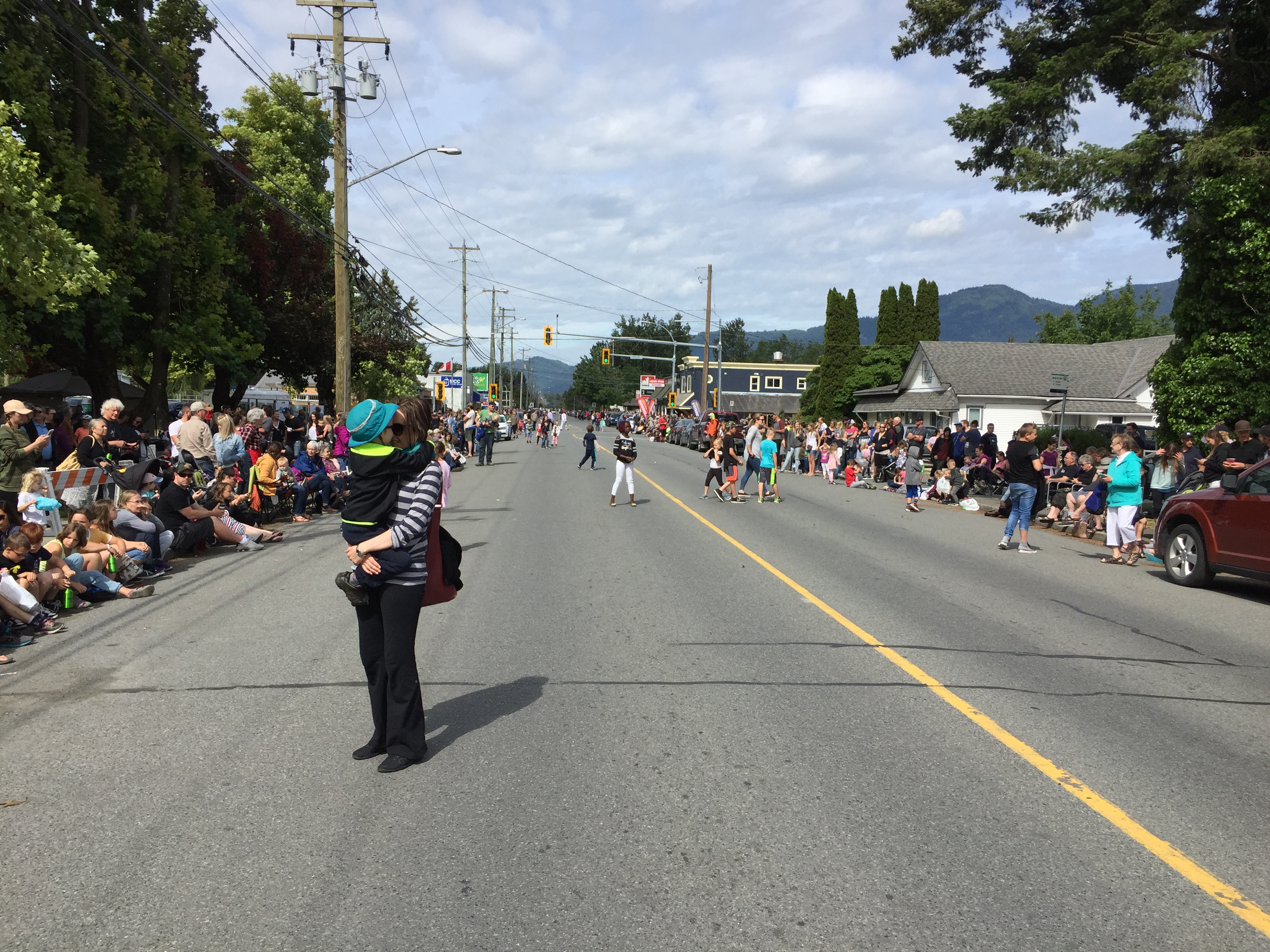
- Looking west down Yarrow Central Rd. towards the village centre during Yarrow Days 2018 in Yarrow, BC.
- Coordinates: 49.086°N 122.052°W
- Country: Canada
- Province: British Columbia

Yarrow is a small community located 90 kilometres east of Vancouver within the City of Chilliwack in British Columbia, Canada. It is in the Fraser Valley at the foot of Vedder Mountain. The village was first settled by Mennonites in the late 1920s, following the draining of Sumas Lake and the reclamation of the former lake bed for agriculture.

== Geography ==
Yarrow is at the foot of the Skagit Range of the Cascade Mountains on the Vedder River, near the latter's confluence with the Fraser, which traverses the Lower Mainland, of British Columbia. The Lower Mainland Ecoregion is part of the Pacific Maritime Ecozone. The village of Yarrow lies between Vedder Mountain to the south and Sumas Mountain to the northwest. The climate is temperate with most of the precipitation falling in the winter months as rain. The summer is warm and relatively dry. The fertile upper Fraser Valley supports the growth of many varieties of fruit, vegetables and herbs. Yarrow's economy is thus primarily agricultural and includes dairy farms, poultry production and field crops (cole crops blueberries, corn and hay).

== History ==
The property that was to later become the village of Yarrow was first owned by Volkert Vedder, who pre-empted, or alienated, it from Crown land, beginning in 1862. During the 1860s, Vedder and his sons Adam and Albert amassed a total of 960 acres. With a further Crown grant in 1878, the Vedder Lands eventually totalled 1,200 acres. In 1910, the British Columbia Electric Railway constructed a line from Vancouver to nearby Chilliwack that skirted the edge of Sumas Lake. One of the stations along this line was named Yarrow. The townsite was built on land reclaimed, in part, from Sumas Lake. In the early 1920s, the provincial government built dykes to channel the Vedder River through the Vedder Canal to the Fraser River. This dyking project, which was completed in 1924, opened 12,000 acres (49 km²) of land for agriculture to the west of Yarrow. By 1928, much of the land was owned by Chauncey Eckert. That same year, a group of ethnic Dutch-German Mennonites, who had fled persecution in the Soviet Union, began buying lots of this land from Eckert. They created a Mennonite community that flourished from the late 1920s until the early 1960s. As many Mennonites began to assimilate into mainstream Canadian culture, they moved away from the rural village of Yarrow, and subsequent settlers were of many different ethnic backgrounds. Today, Yarrow functions mainly as a semi-rural suburb of Chilliwack.

== Yarrow Days ==
On the first weekend of June, residents of Yarrow celebrate their community with Yarrow Days. Festivities begin at 10:00 a.m., Saturday, with a parade down Yarrow Central Road that starts at the Yarrow Community School on Wilson Road and ends at the Yarrow Mennonite Brethren church. Booths located in the park display local crafts, clothes, and homemade food. Particularly popular are the bake-sales and barbecues by members of the local churches, offering ethnic and traditional wares. Performers provide entertainment as residents and visitors make new friends and renew acquaintances. Local merchants offer specials in the nearby shops. Events include a barbecue and dance at the Community Hall on Saturday night and a pancake breakfast at the hall and church service in the park on Sunday morning.

== Yarrow Ecovillage ==
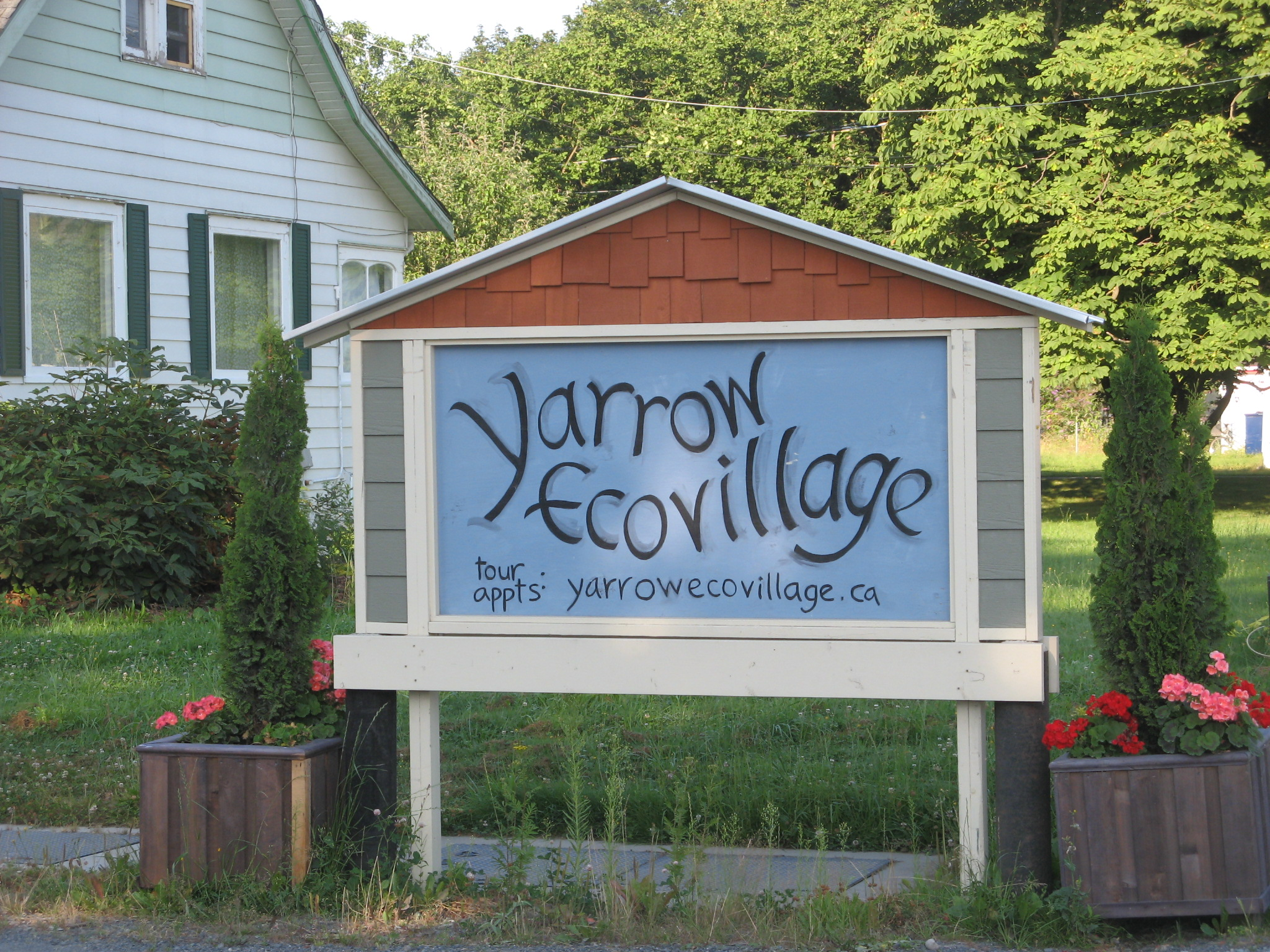
Sign at Yarrow Ecovillage entrance

The Yarrow Ecovillage is an intentional community in Yarrow, British Columbia, Canada. Yarrow is a settlement of 3,000 population within the municipal boundaries of Chilliwack, British Columbia. The Ecovillage is a member-designed community that aims to achieve a more socially, ecologically and economically sustainable way of life. The Ecovillage's master plan for the 10-hectare (25-acre) former dairy farm, foresaw three main legal entities: An 8-hectare (20-acre) organic farm, a 31-unit multigenerational cohousing community (later increased to 33 units), and a mixed-use development with just under 2800 m^{2} (30,000 sf) of commercial space, a 17-unit senior cohousing community and a learning centre.

Chilliwack City Council approved the plans, granting "Ecovillage zoning" in 2006. In January 2015, the Ecovillage had 100 residents (one third of whom were children) in the multigenerational cohousing community ("Groundswell Cohousing"). The organic farm has been in operation since 2003.

In January 2014, Groundswell Cohousing at the Yarrow Ecovillage was awarded the "Sustainability Leadership Award" by the Chilliwack Chamber of Commerce at the 19th Annual Business Excellence Awards.

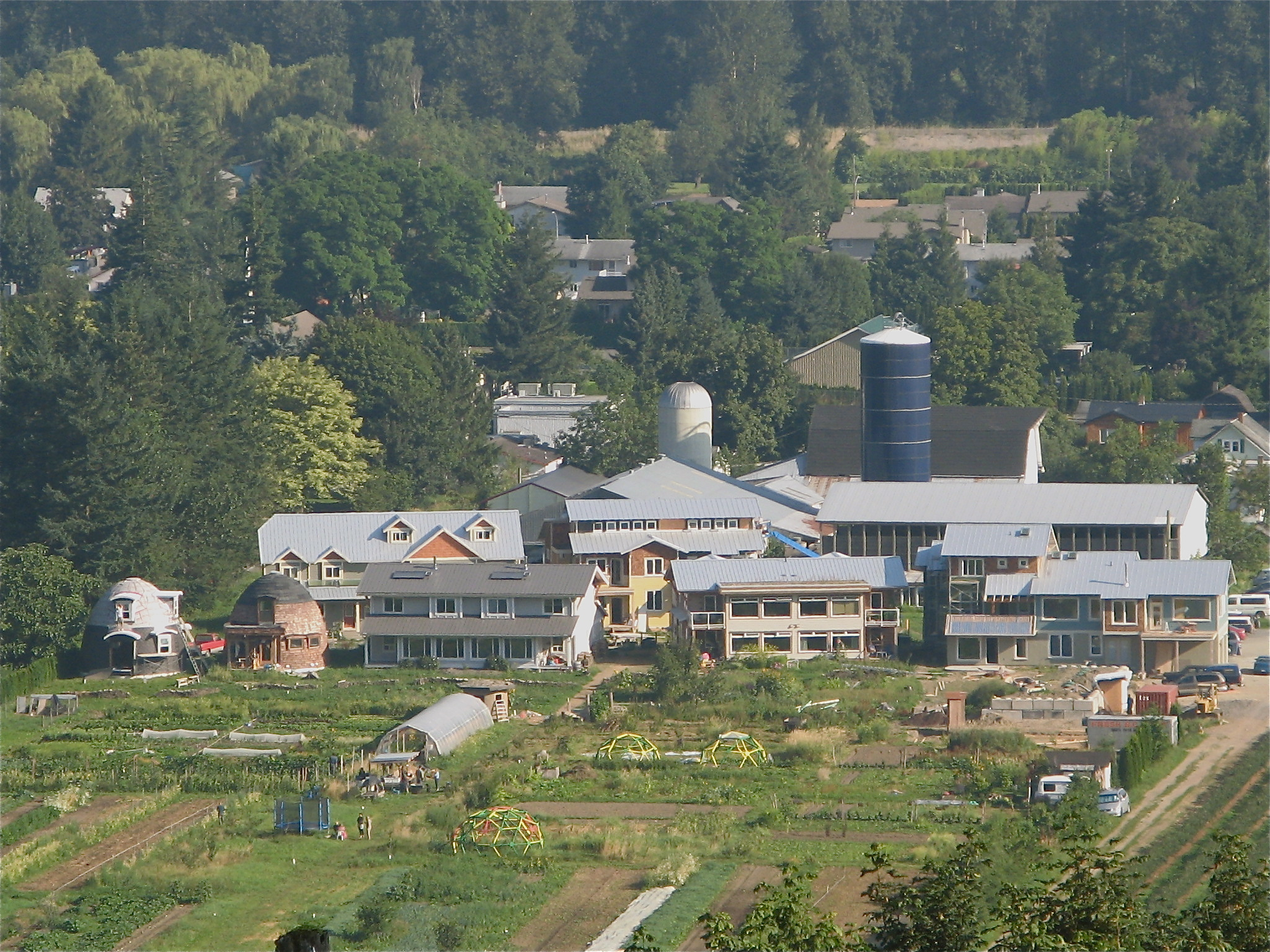
Yarrow Ecovillage from the south

== See also ==
- Greendale, British Columbia
- Sumas Prairie
