= Vedder =

Vedder is a Dutch and Low German surname. Vedder, related to Dutch vader ('father'), meant 'uncle' (father's or mother's brother) in Middle Dutch and Eastern dialects of Dutch. Notable people with the surname include:

- Adam Swart Vedder (1834–1905), New York state born British Columbian politician, son of Volkert
- Amy Vedder (born 1951), American ecologist and primatologist
- Buddy Vedder (born 1994), Dutch actor and television presenter
- Commodore P. Vedder (1838–1910), New York politician
- Eddie Vedder (born 1964), American rock musician, singer, and songwriter
- Edward Bright Vedder (1878–1952), U.S. Army physician, researcher of deficiency diseases, and medical educator
- Elihu Vedder (1836–1923), American painter, book illustrator, and poet
- Eva Vedder (b. 1999), Dutch tennis player
- Harmen Albertse Vedder (1635–1715), Dutch settler in New Netherland, forebear of nearly all Vedders in North America
- Heinrich Vedder (1876–1972), German missionary, linguist, ethnologist, and historian
- Henry Clay Vedder (1853–1935), American Baptist church historian
- Jake Vedder (born 1998), American snowboarder
- Jill Vedder née McCormick (born 1977), American philanthropist, activist and fashion model; wife of Eddie Vedder
- John F. D. Vedder (1789–1863), New York politician
- Lou Vedder (1897–1990), American baseball and football player
- Ria Vedder-Wubben (1951–2016), Dutch politician
- Richard Vedder (born 1940), American economist and college professor
- Shirley Vedder née Matthews (1942–2013), Canadian pop singer
- Yvette Iola Vedder (1928–2010), American actress, pin-up model and singer
- Zelmar Vedder (born 2002), American football player

== See also ==
- Vedder River, Vedder Mountain, and Vedder Crossing, British Columbia, Canada, named for Volkert Vedder and family from Schenectady, New York, who arrived in the area ca. 1860
- Vedder Sand, geologic formation in California
- Vedder Van Dyck (1889–1960), American Episcopal bishop
