= Fraser Lowland =

Lowland region in southwestern British Columbia and northwestern Washington

- Lowland
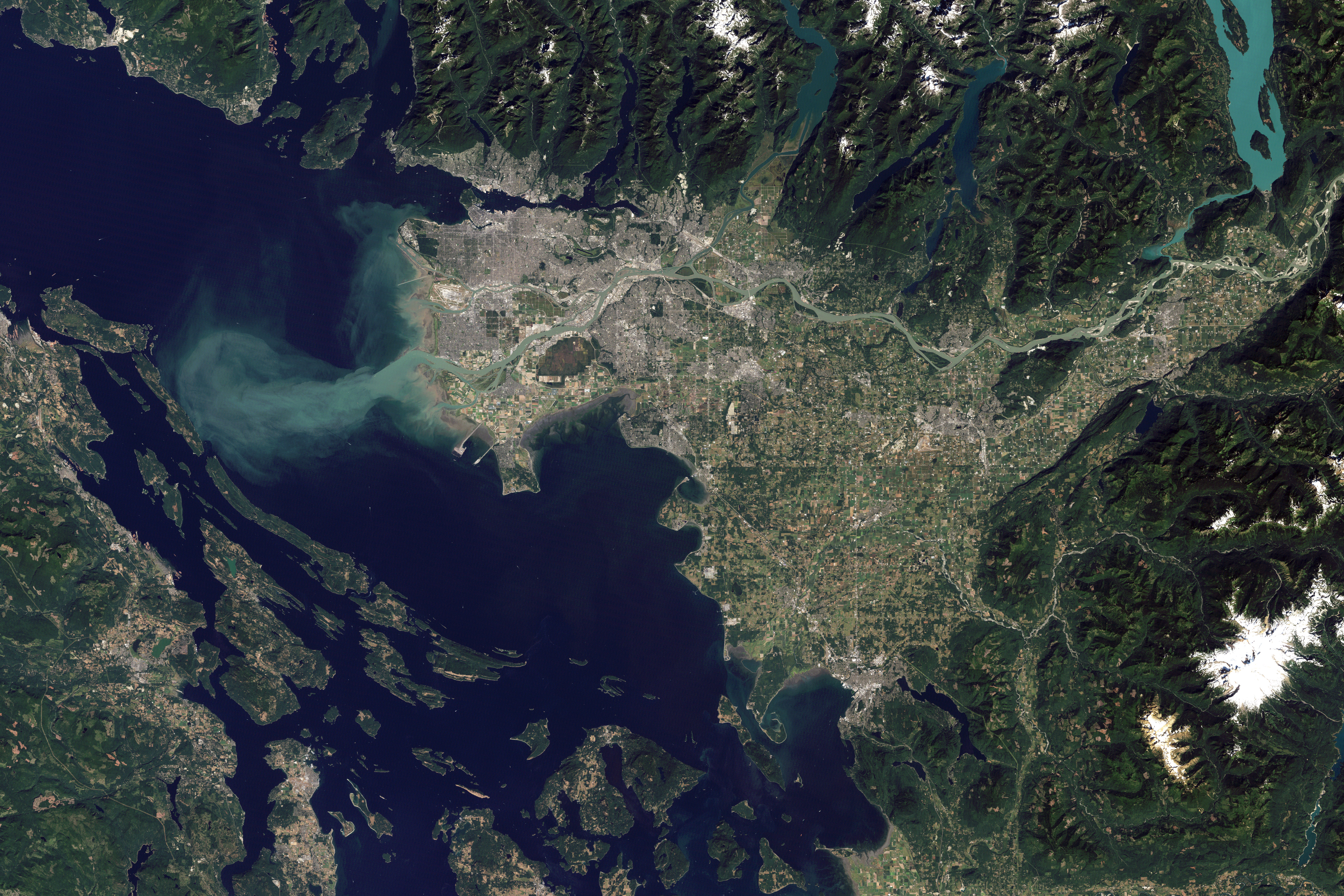
- Landsat image of the Fraser Lowland, which stretches from Chilliwack in the northeast to the Strait of Georgia in the southwest. Sediment deposited by the Fraser River is clearly visible.

- Location within British Columbia
- Coordinates: 49°2′N 122°34′W
- Location: British Columbia, Canada; Washington, United States
- Part of: Georgia Depression

The Fraser Lowland is a landform and physiographic region in the Pacific Northwest of North America, shared between the Canadian province of British Columbia and the U.S. state of Washington. The region includes much of the Lower Mainland region of British Columbia, and the coastal plains of Washington's Whatcom County. As a physiographic region, the Fraser Lowland is part of the Georgia Depression, which in turn is part of the Coastal Trough.

The eponymous Fraser River in the Lowland's north and the lower basins of its tributaries (mainly the Pitt River, Coquitlam River and Vedder/Chilliwack Rivers), as well as the entire catchment of the oppositely flowing Sumas River, are the Lowland's primary river system.

However, the region also includes the lower Nooksack River basin ("Nooksack Lowland") south of the Canada–US border, which belongs to a completely separate river system arising from the southeast in the namesaked valleys around the North Cascades' Mount Shuksan, Baker and Twin Sisters.

Overall, the Fraser Lowland encompasses all the fertile low-lying fluvial plains between and around the Fraser and Nooksack rivers, including the Sumas Prairie, the Burrard Peninsula, and sometimes also the North Shore lowlands around the Burrard Inlet.

The American pene-exclave of Point Roberts lies to the region's west, at the southern end of the Tsawwassen peninsula.

== Geography ==
The Fraser Lowland is roughly triangular and about 3,500 square kilometres (1,400 sq mi) in total area. The Strait of Georgia coastline between Burrard Inlet in the north and Bellingham Bay in the south marks its western/southwestern boundary, and the region extends east through the generally flat terrain between the Coast Mountains to the north and the Vedder Mountain/Cascade Range to the southeast, all the way to the easternmost end of the Fraser Valley near Hope, where the Coquihalla River drains into the Fraser River at the latter's westward bends out of the Fraser Canyon. The Canadian Sumas and the Chilliwack Mountain stand out on the southbank of the Fraser River, in the middle of the eastern Fraser Lowland, demarcating the Fraser Valley into its "Upper" and "Lower" parts. The rich soil, plentiful precipitation, and mild marine climate make the entire region a prime agricultural land. Much has been cultivated for farmland.

The Fraser Lowland is politically divided by the Canada–United States border into two parts. Both the area and population are much larger on the Canadian side (Fraser Valley and Sumas Prairie) with about 2.4 million residents. The main population center is Greater Vancouver at the northwestern end of the Fraser Lowland. Other population centers on the Canadian side include Abbotsford and Chilliwack, both part of the Fraser Valley Regional District.

The population on the American side of the Lowland (the Nooksack Lowland and all the upper Sumas River basin south of Sumas) is about 200,000. It is dominated by the coastal city of Bellingham at the Lowland's southernmost tip.

== See also ==
- Geography of British Columbia
- List of physiogeographic regions of British Columbia
- Fraser Valley
- Lower Mainland
- Lower Mainland Ecoregion
