= Chadsey =

Chadsey may refer to:

== People ==
- Charles Ernest Chadsey (1870–1930), American educator and school administrator
- Geoffrey Chadsey (born 1967), American artist

== Places ==
- Chadsey Lake, on Sumas Mountain
- Chadsey High School, a public secondary school in Detroit, Michigan
