= Fedder =

Fedder is a surname. Notable people with the surname include:

- Jan Fedder (1955–2019), German actor
- Judith Fedder (born 1958), United States Air Force general
- Steen Fedder (born 1951), Danish chess master

== See also ==
- Tedder
- Vedder
