= Sumas Mountain (British Columbia) =

Mountain in British Columbia, Canada

- Canadian Sumas
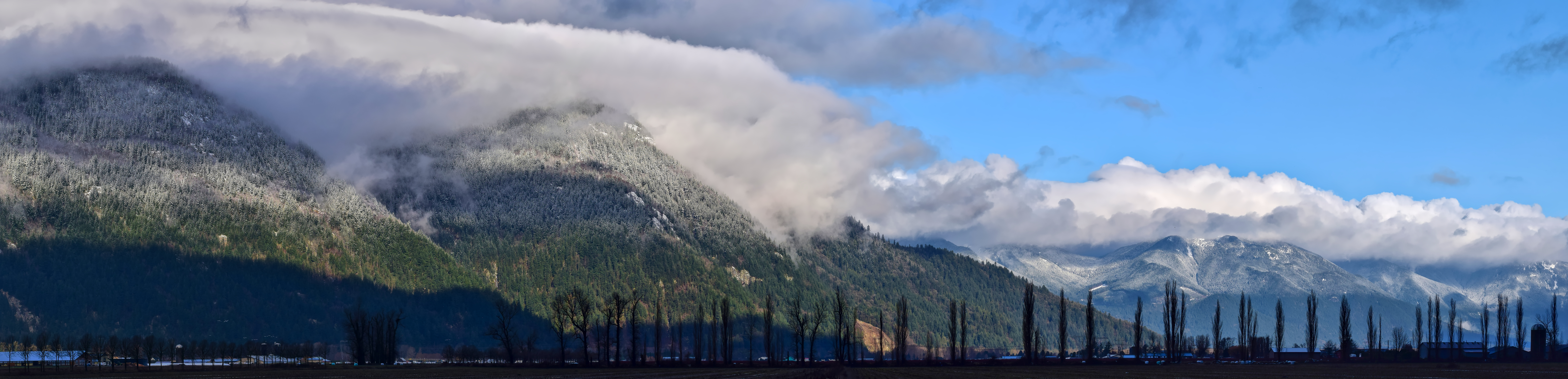
- Winter view of Sumas Mountain taken between Abbotsford and Chilliwack, BC, Canada

Highest point
- Coordinates: 49°05′21″N 122°10′15″W

Geography
- Location within British Columbia Location within Canada
- Location: British Columbia
- Country: Canada

Sumas Mountain, also referred to as Canadian Sumas to distinguish it from an identically named mountain just 10 km (6.2 mi) to the south in U.S. state of Washington across the border, is a mountain in eastern Fraser Lowland, in the Lower Mainland region of the Canadian province of British Columbia. It sits on the south bank of the Fraser River, west of the smaller Chilliwack Mountain across the Vedder River mouth, and serves as a geographic landmark dividing the Fraser Valley into "Upper" and "Lower" sections. Sumas Peak is an official name for the summit located on the south shore of the Fraser River in the Fraser Valley between Abbotsford and Chilliwack. Elevation 910 m (2,986 ft) above sea level, prominence 875 m (2,871 ft).

The mountain is separated from the Vedder Mountain and the North Cascades by the drained Sumas Lake, now a flatland referred to as Sumas Prairie that is part of the greater floodplain of the Fraser River basin, south of which is a same-named sister mountain—American Sumas—in Washington's Whatcom County. West of the mountain is Matsqui Prairie, another floodplain, and north of the Fraser, which lies along the mountain's north flank, are similar floodplains—Nicomen Island and Hatzic Prairie.

The urban area of Abbotsford is located to the mountain's west, and it is home to a number of Abbotsford's suburban areas, notably Clayburn. In its central portion is the historic community of Straiton, officially named in 1904 for Thomas Bell Straiton who founded a homestead on Sumas Mountain in 1893, and also a store and post office. Its higher eastern reaches are mostly wilderness and tower over Greendale, a community within the city of Chilliwack; the mountain's summit, Sumas Peak, is located in this area, along with Chadsey Lake.

Sumas Mountain Provincial Park is located in the higher, northern reaches of the mountain. Historic industry on the mountain includes livestock and crop farming, logging, and mining, notably brick-clay—which gave rise to the mining community of Clayburn—farming, gravel mining, and logging continue on the mountain to the present day. On its south side is the reserve of the Sumas First Nation.

The mountain protects McDonald Park, a dark-sky preserve, from the light pollution caused by the nearby cities of Abbotsford, Chilliwack, and Mission.

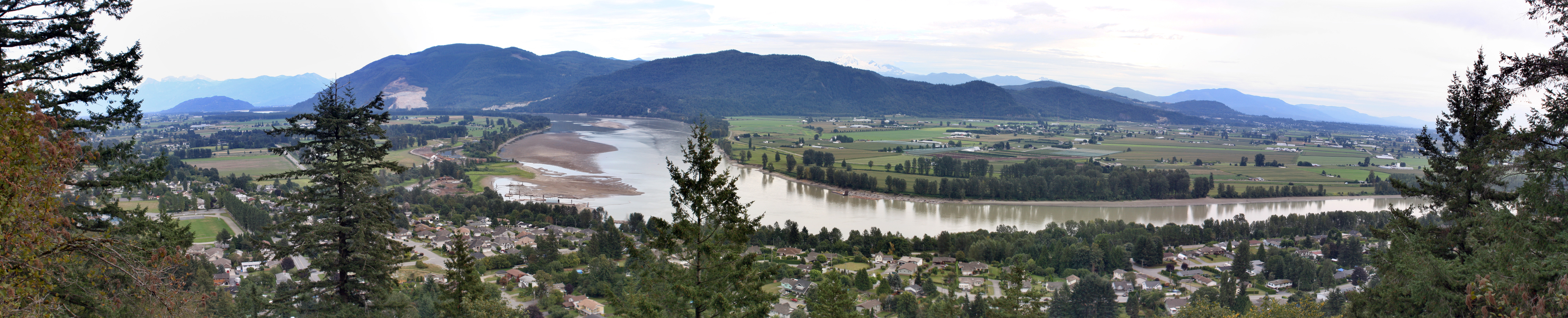
Sumas Mountain as seen from a cliff above the Mission neighbourhood of Hatzic, to the left is Chilliwack Mountain, with Mount Cheam above it—and Mount Baker is visible above the centre of Sumas Mountain

== Etymology ==
Sumas is a Halq̓eméylem word meaning "a big level opening", referring to the Sumas Prairie area south of the mountain, formerly Sumas Lake. A common 19th century spelling of Sumas was Smess; Simon Fraser's journal recorded the name as Shemotch.

== Biogeoclimatic zone and subzones ==
Sumas Mountain lies entirely within the Coastal Western Hemlock (CWH) zone, with three sub-zones mapped: the very dry maritime (CWHxm1) on south and west-facing slopes at low elevations, the dry maritime (CWHdm) over the vast majority of the mountain, and the very wet maritime (CWHvm2) at higher elevations.

== See also ==
- List of mountains of British Columbia
  - Chilliwack Mountain
  - Vedder Mountain
  - Nicomen Mountain
- Cascade Range
- Garibaldi Range
