= Little Chilliwack River =

Location
- Country: United States
- State: Washington
- County: Whatcom County

Physical characteristics
- Source: Ridge between it and Silesia Creek
  - location: North Cascades
- Mouth: Chilliwack River
  - location: Just south of the inlet of Chilliwack Lake
  - coordinates: 48°59′34″N 121°24′38″W

The Little Chilliwack River is a small river in Whatcom County, Washington. It is a tributary of the Chilliwack River, entering the river just below the Canada–United States border.

== History ==
Henry Custer, a topographer and explorer, visited the creek during the summer of 1859 while on an expedition across the northern section of the North Cascades National Park. Entering the park from Ensawkwatch Creek, a tributary of the Chilliwack River, he made his way up to the top of Middle Peak where he "found [himself] to be on the dividing ridge, between the waters of the [Ensawkwatch] & those of the [Little Chilliwack River]." He then followed the Little Chilliwack River to its confluence with the Chilliwack River and continued on his expedition. Custer's Native American guide referred to the Little Chilliwack River, as well as the mainstream Chilliwack river as "Klaheih".

The area has a history of wildfire, with 15 smokejumpers from Missoula, Montana being flown out to the headwaters in 1958 to fight a 20-acre (8.1 ha) fire, and 15 more firefighters from Glacier, Washington joining them. In 2018, a 75 acres (30 ha) wildfire, named the Little Fork Fire, was discovered in the Little Chilliwack River area.

== Course ==
The river originates at a ridge between it and Silesia Creek. It flows just over 7 miles (11 km) northeast from there to its confluence with the Chilliwack on the opposite side of the river from a trail leading up the Chilliwack. The Little Fork merges with it just under 2 kilometres (1.2 mi) above its mouth.

== Little Fork ==
The Little Fork Little Chilliwack River is a tributary of the Little Chilliwack River. It is slightly more than 3 mi (4.8 km) long and flows through a densely forested valley draining quartz diorite terrain.

== See also ==
- List of tributaries of the Fraser River
- List of rivers in Washington
