= Columbia Valley (Lower Mainland) =

- Location of Columbia Valley in British Columbia
- Coordinates: 49°00′00″N 122°05′00″W
- Country: Canada
- Province: British Columbia
- Time zone: UTC−07:00 (PT)

The Columbia Valley is a small valley and unincorporated settlement stretching southwest of Cultus Lake and extending across the Canada–United States border into Whatcom County, Washington. It is located to the south of the City of Chilliwack and east of Abbotsford, lying between Vedder Mountain and the main bulk of the Cascade Mountains. There is no border crossing in the valley, which has only a few farms in it. The community of Lindell Beach is located in it, on the south shore of Cultus Lake. Its terrain is similar to that of the Fraser Valley, though at a slightly higher elevation.

== History ==
During the 1920s a logging railroad operation supplied logs to the Campbell River Timber Company's mill in White Rock, moving the logs to White Rock via the American side of the border.
