= Fedden =

Fedden is a surname. Notable people with the surname include:

- Mary Fedden (1915–2012), British artist
- Robin Fedden (1908–1977), British writer, diplomat, and mountaineer
- Romilly Fedden (1875–1939), British artist
- Roy Fedden (1885–1973), British engineer

== See also ==
- Fedder
