= Vedder Mountain =

Mountain in British Columbia, Canada

Coordinates: 49.0664°N 122.0119°W

The Vedder Mountain is a branch of the Cascade Range in the Pacific Northwest, located at the southeastern edge of the Fraser Lowland in British Columbia, Canada, between the village of Yarrow and the village of Cultus Lake, extending from the Vedder River to the Saar Creek valley. It separates the broad Fraser Valley and Sumas Prairie in its northwest from the narrow Columbia Valley to its southeast.

The mountain stands 924 m (3,031 ft) high and is tree-covered to its summit with some open areas. A hiking trail crosses the mountain. Old logging roads are also present. Catherwood Logging rail-logged the hill in the 1930s, and both east and west sides were cut with rails coming from Vedder Crossing.
