= Yarrow Ecovillage =

Coordinates: 49.0810°N 122.0530°W

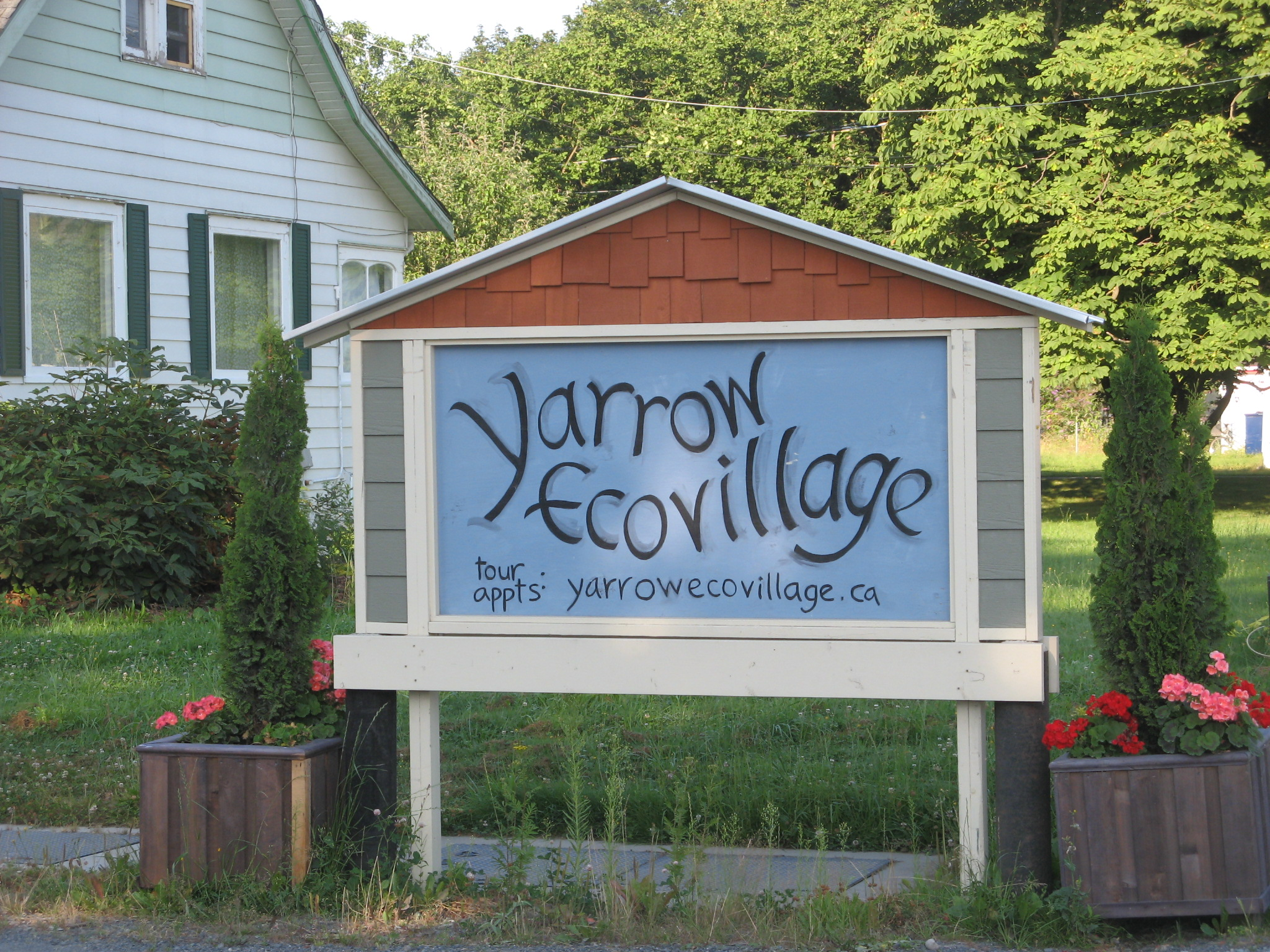
Sign at Yarrow Ecovillage entrance

The Yarrow Ecovillage is an intentional community in Yarrow, British Columbia, Canada. Yarrow is a settlement of 3,000 population within the municipal boundaries of Chilliwack, British Columbia. The Ecovillage is a member-designed community that aims to achieve a more socially, ecologically and economically sustainable way of life. The Ecovillage's master plan for the 10-hectare (25-acre) former dairy farm, foresaw three main legal entities: An 8-hectare (20-acre) organic farm, a 31-unit multigenerational cohousing community (later increased to 33 units), and a mixed-use development with just under 2800 m^{2} (30,000 sf) of commercial space, a 17-unit senior cohousing community and a learning centre.

Chilliwack City Council approved the plans, granting "Ecovillage zoning" in 2006. In January 2015, the Ecovillage had 100 residents (one third of whom were children) in the multigenerational cohousing community ("Groundswell Cohousing"). The organic farm has been in operation since 2003.

In January 2014, Groundswell Cohousing at the Yarrow Ecovillage was awarded the "Sustainability Leadership Award" by the Chilliwack Chamber of Commerce at the 19th Annual Business Excellence Awards.

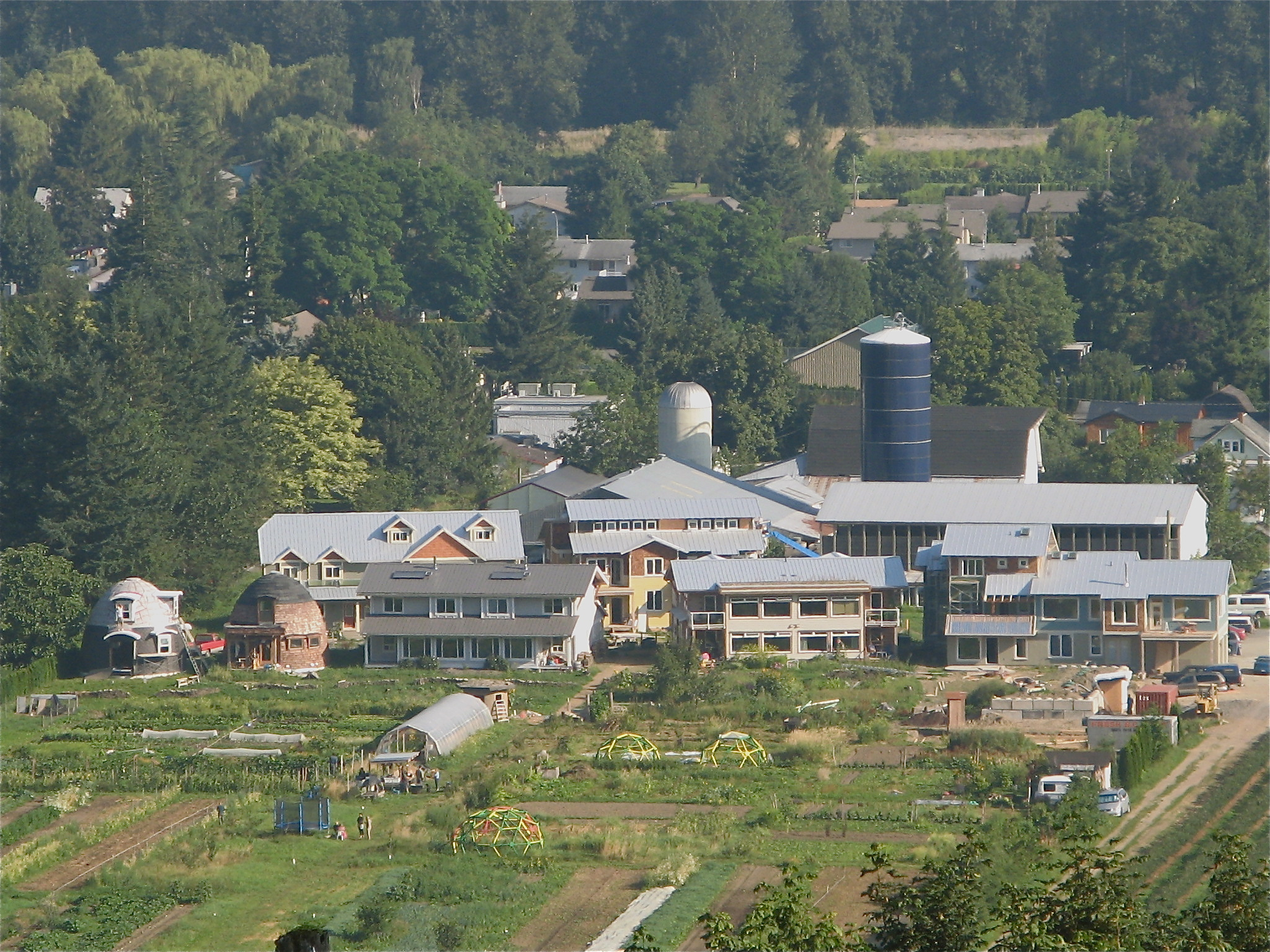
Yarrow Ecovillage from the south

== History ==
Interest in sustainable settlements increased in the 1990s. In 1991, Robert Gilman and Diane Gilman co-authored a study called "Ecovillages and Sustainable Communities" for Gaia Trust. That led to a conference with the same title in Findhorn, Scotland, in 1995. According to Ross Jackson, co-founder of Gaia Trust, "somehow they had struck a chord that resonated far and wide. The word 'ecovillage', which was barely four years old at the time, thus became part of the language of the Cultural Creatives."

In the late 1990s a group formed to consider the idea of building an ecovillage in the Fraser Valley of British Columbia. That led to the purchase of a former dairy farm in Yarrow in 2002. The farm was originally owned by the Heinrichs family, who purchased it from Chauncey Eckert soon after the village of Yarrow was founded.

The Yarrow group grew rapidly from six founding members. The Yarrow Ecovillage Society (YES) Cooperative was formed in August, 2002 and the members engaged in a series of activities to conceptualize and design the ecovillage. Their "co-design" process, initiated that October, consisted of three steps: 1) brainstorming workshops within the group, 2) consultation with City officials, and 3) public meetings with the local community. They repeated these three steps several times. This served to build support with the City planning staff and in the neighbouring community.

Following the consultation process, the ecovillage submitted its request for rezoning. The rezoning process occurred in two stages. The first, approved in August, 2004, was a commercial-residential zone on a small parcel of the property on Yarrow Central road. This allowed for a mix of retail businesses and residences above them. The second stage, approved in July, 2006, rezoned the remaining five acres formerly zoned "rural residential" to an "ecovillage zone." This increased the land's maximum density from 5 to 40, or more, residences. Chilliwack Mayor Clint Hames called this "the first ecovillage zone in Canada." The ecovillage purchased its first commercial entity, the Yarrow Deli, located on a neighbouring property, in October 2006.

With the achievement of Ecovillage zoning in 2006, work began on roads and infrastructure. Two timber frame duplexes were started in 2008, but construction was halted when the 2008 financial crisis tightened credit and delayed a major construction loan. Construction on the duplexes resumed in early 2009 and the first was completed in August, 2009. In January 2010, a new site plan was completed. The plan included two cohousing communities, the first of which, Groundswell Cohousing was to be a total 31 (later expanded to 33) units to be completed in 2014.

== Components ==
The Yarrow Ecovillage is organized in two main components: An organic farm and a cohousing community.

=== Organic farm ===
The Yarrow Ecovillage Community Farm has several farming entities: Three of these were in production in 2012: Osprey Organic Farm, Ohm Organic Farm and Soban Farm, all producing organic vegetables for sale in farmer's markets in Lower Mainland communities. There is also a Community Supported Agriculture (CSA) food box program. In 2014 Osprey and Ohm Organic Farms were succeeded by three new commercial farming entities: Ripple Creek Organic Farm, Chubby Roots Organic Farm and The Farmacy. A permaculture food forest, called the Stewart Creek Food Forest, combines plants and animals (muscovy ducks) by "stacking functions" in layers—i.e., each plant or animal having multiple roles.

=== Multigenerational Cohousing ===
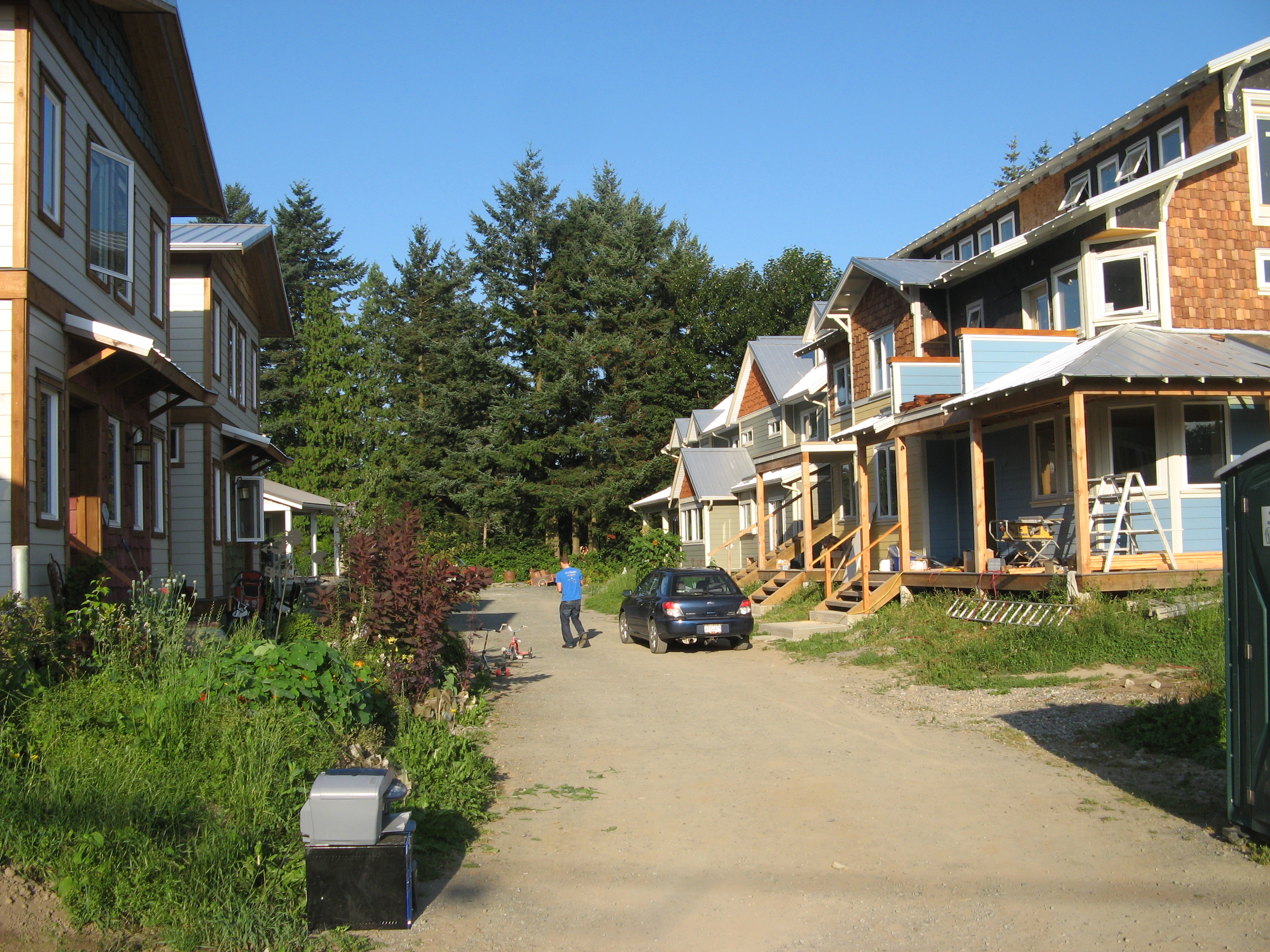
Groundswell Cohousing at Yarrow Ecovillage

The multigenerational cohousing project was given focus in a series of workshops organized by Katie McCamant and Charles Durrett of the Cohousing Company, beginning in January 2010. That year, the Ecovillage group decided to divide the property between various entities or "centres of initiative." It was decided that the cohousing community would hold title to the land as a strata corporation (condominium), which was then named "Groundswell Cohousing." The members of Groundswell participated in the design of their housing and with the other aspects of building community. By January 2012, the population of the ecovillage had reached 50.

Groundswell, the first cohousing community within the ecovillage site has 33 units in various housing types—duplexes, flats, townhouses. A 362 m^{2} (3,900 sf) common house will be located on the east side of the property, bounded by the driveway and two pedestrian walkways. The common house is intended to be a "gathering place" with a variety of common facilities to foster a sense of community and complement the private spaces of secluded areas and housing units.

Cohousing is the first building block of the ecovillage. According to architects McCamant and Durrett it will play an important part in creating the culture of the village. "In building it, the group has learned cooperation and development skills, as well as how to brainstorm, discuss and decide; it is the place where well-intentioned citizens learn to make consequential decisions together to accomplish their environmental and social aspirations. It is also where the relationships built during the design and development process will carry over to everyday interactions and relationships one the community is complete." In mid-2013, the second phase of Groundswell Cohousing was initiated, adding 18 units for completion in 2014, and bring the housing to thirty-three units. This phase was described as marrying "the convenience and security of a tight-knit community with the privacy of independent home ownership." Residents each have their own homes, but may choose to "join together for aspects of daily living, including community meals, recreation, and child care."

On January 25, 2014, Groundswell Cohousing and the Ecovillage won the "Sustainability Leadership Award" at the Chamber of Commerce's 19th Annual Awards ceremony. The award, sponsored by the City of Chilliwack, stated: "The recipient of this award has actively implemented, integrated and promoted sustainability into the workplace. They are recognized for their outstanding contributions to community sustainability through economic, social and environmental excellence and have demonstrated a visible commitment to sustainable business practices."

In mid-2014, the last phase of strata-titled (condominium) housing was completed in Groundswell Cohousing at the Yarrow Ecovillage. There are 100 people living in the thirty-three units.
