= Teder =

Family name

Teder is a surname of Estonian origin, meaning "black grouse," and may refer to:

- Hillar Teder (born 1962), Estonian businessman
- Indrek Teder (born 1957), Estonian lawyer and jurist
- Johanna Teder (born 2000), Estonian basketball player
- Kristjan Teder (1901–1960), Estonian painter
- Tarmo Teder (born 1958), Estonian writer, poet and critic

== See also ==
- Tedder, surname
