= Lower Mainland Ecoregion =

Ecological region in British Columbia, Canada

The Lower Mainland Ecoregion is the biogeoclimatic region that surrounds Vancouver, British Columbia, comprising the eastern edge of the Georgia Depression and extending from Powell River, British Columbia on the Sunshine Coast to Hope at the eastern end of the Fraser Valley. It thus corresponds, for the most part, with the popular usage of the term "Lower Mainland." The Lower Mainland Ecoregion is a part of the Pacific Maritime Ecozone.

The ecoregion is bounded by the Coast and Cascade Mountains and traversed by the Fraser River. It has a unique climate, flora and fauna, geology and land use. The following description is adapted from Environment Canada's Ecological Framework of Canada. The ecoregion extends west from the Skagit Range of the Cascade Mountains at Chilliwack to the Fraser river delta at Richmond and north to include a portion of the Georgia Lowland along the Sunshine Coast.

== Climate ==
The mean annual temperature in the Lower Mainland is 9 °C with a summer mean of 15 °C and a winter mean of 3.5 °C. Annual precipitation ranges from an annual mean of 850 mm in the west end to 2000 mm in the eastern end of the Fraser Valley and at higher elevations. Maximum precipitation occurs as rain in winter. Less than ten percent falls as snow at sea level but the amount of snowfall increases significantly with elevation.

== Flora and fauna ==
Forests of Coast Douglas-fir, with an understory of salal, Oregon-grape and moss, are typical of the mature native vegetation found throughout the ecoregion. Mixed stands of Coast Douglas-fir and Western Hemlock are common, with some dogwood and arbutus occurring on drier sites. Red alder is a common pioneer species where sites have been disturbed. Wet sites support Coast Douglas-fir, Western Hemlock, and Western Redcedar. Wildlife includes black-tailed deer, coyote, raccoon, shorebirds, and waterfowl.

== Geology ==
The ecoregion is underlain by unconsolidated glaciofluvial deposits, silty alluvium, silty and clayey marine sediments and glacial till. Bedrock outcrops of Mesozoic and Palaeozoic origin form rolling hills up to about 310 metres above sea level. The Fraser River dominates this lowland. Gleysols, Mesisols, and Humisols are the dominant wetland soils in the region, while Eutric and Dystric Brunisols and some Podzols have developed on sandy to loamy outwash and glacial till in the uplands.

== Land use ==
The region includes a mix of urban settlement and agricultural land, comprising both the largest population centre and some of the most fertile farmland in British Columbia. Intensive agriculture occurs on the rich bottomland of the Fraser Valley where it competes with urban development. Forestry takes place on the slopes of the mountains. Coastal salt marshes provide important wildlife habitat in the Fraser delta and Boundary Bay. There are about 870 square kilometres of productive farmland in the ecoregion.

There is rapid urban and suburban growth in the Vancouver area and communities in the Fraser Valley and Sunshine Coast. The main population centre in this ecoregion is Greater Vancouver. Other centres include North Vancouver (city and district), Chilliwack, Abbotsford, and Mission.

=== Profile of land use ===
Agricultural land area remained relatively stable between 1971 and 2006, declining by less than 3%. While the number of cattle declined by 12% during this period, poultry inventories increased significantly, rising by 129%. The region accounted for 13% of Canada's poultry production in 2006. The ecoregion's population increased 102% between 1971 and 2006 as compared to Canada's population growth of 47%. With 473 persons per square kilometre in 2006, the ecoregion was Canada's most densely populated. The population of the ecoregion in 2006 was approximately 2.4 million people, which represents 7.6% of Canada's population.
