= McDonald Park =

Coordinates: 49.091°N 122.134°W

McDonald Park, in Abbotsford, British Columbia, Canada, is a dark-sky preserve, designated thus by the Royal Astronomical Society of Canada.

The park is located in a valley, and at night light pollution from the nearby cities of Abbotsford, Chilliwack, and Mission is blocked by Sumas Mountain. The park opens at night for observations under the auspices of the Fraser Valley Astronomers Society.
