= Greendale, Chilliwack =

Greendale
- Village in Chilliwack
- Location of Greendale in British Columbia
- Coordinates: 49°07′00″N 122°03′00″W
- City: Chilliwack
- Province: British Columbia
- Country: Canada
- Settled: c. 1860
- Time zone: UTC-8 (PST)
  - Summer (DST): UTC-7 (PDT)
- Postal code: V2P
- Area code: +1-604

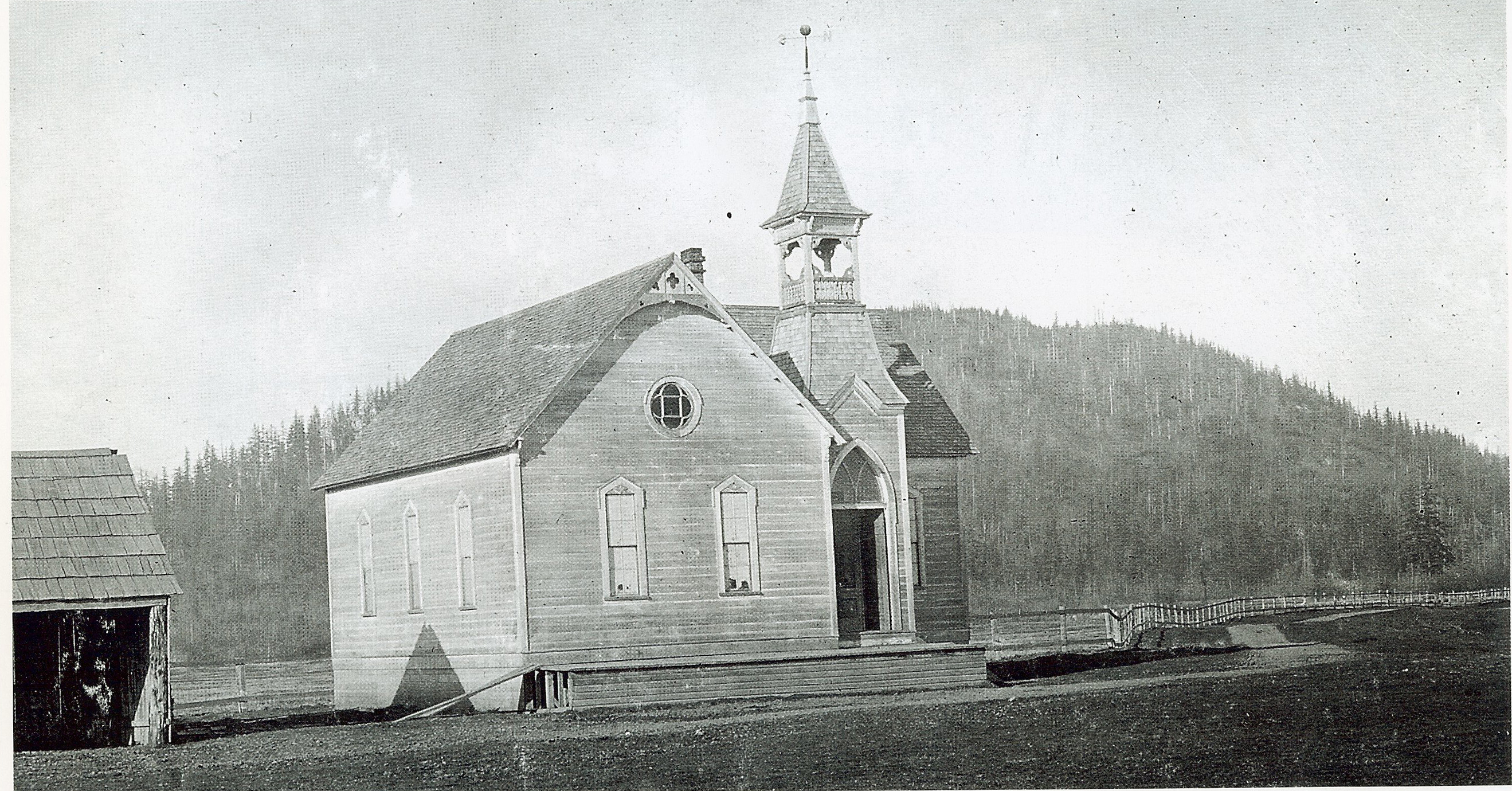
Sumas Methodist Church near Chilliwack before 1900 off Yale Rd in Greendale

Greendale is a primarily agricultural settlement within Chilliwack, British Columbia, Canada, located 92 kilometres (57 mi) east of the City of Vancouver. Greendale is located on the west side of Chilliwack, bordering the east side of the City of Abbotsford. The Vedder River forms the border between Greendale and Yarrow which lies to the South. Greendale was originally called Sumas, but got renamed in 1951 to avoid confusion with the adjoining municipality, the District of Sumas (now part of the City of Abbotsford), as well as Sumas, Washington. The area was once a 10,000 acres (4,000 ha) lake at the base of Sumas Mountain. Sumas Lake was drained in the early 1920s. Greendale has experienced two major floods, after the completed drainage, in 1894 and 1948.

The Great Blue Heron Nature Reserve is located in Greendale.
