= Vedder River =

Vedder River Chilliwack River
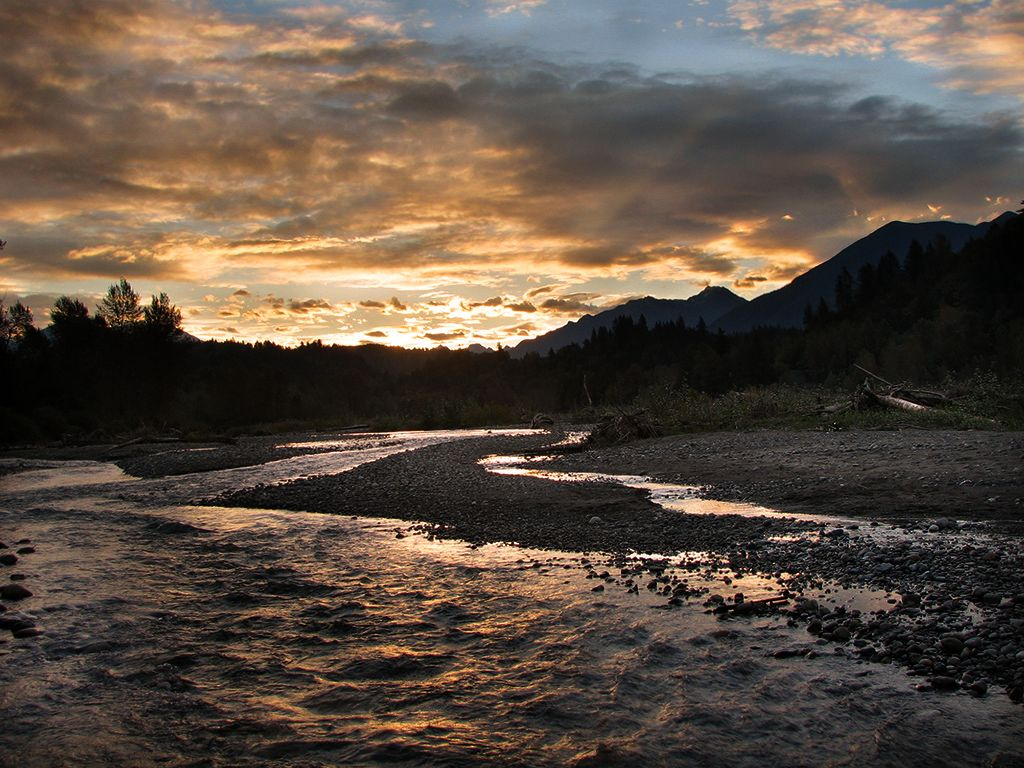
- The Vedder River, in Chilliwack, BC.

Location
- Country: Canada, United States
- Province: British Columbia
- State: Washington

Physical characteristics
- Source: Hannegan Pass
  - coordinates: 48°53′3″N 121°31′42″W
- Mouth: Sumas River
  - coordinates: 49°07′35″N 122°05′54″W
- Length: 80 km (50 mi)
- Basin size: 1,230 km^{2} (470 sq mi)
- Discharge
  - average: 77 m^{3}/s (2,700 cu ft/s)
  - minimum: 15 m^{3}/s (530 cu ft/s)
  - maximum: 1,150 m^{3}/s (41,000 cu ft/s)

The Vedder River, called the Chilliwack River above Vedder Crossing, is a river in the Canadian province of British Columbia and the U.S. state of Washington.

The name Chilliwack comes from the Halkomelem word Tcil'Qe'uk, meaning "valley of many streams".

== Course ==
Originating as the Chilliwack River in Washington's North Cascades National Park, the river begins at Hannegan Pass and flows north across the Canada–United States border and into Chilliwack Lake. The river flows through Hells Gorge, a deep, dangerous-to-access gorge just below the river's headwaters that is home of a waterfall that the river drops over. The river picks up the Little Chilliwack River before crossing the border. There is a large sandy beach located where the river enters the lake, a popular recreational area among locals, however access is now restricted and the south shores of Chilliwack Lake are protected as an ecological reserve. The river exits the north end of the lake and flows generally west via the Chilliwack River Valley to emerge on the Fraser Lowland on the south side of the City of Chilliwack. At Vedder Crossing, the river is joined by the Sweltzer River before flowing under the Vedder Bridge at which its name changes to the Vedder River, after which it flows west and north to join the Sumas River just before that river's confluence with the Fraser River at the northeast end of Sumas Mountain. The river crosses the Fraser floodplain from Vedder Crossing to its confluence with the Sumas via the Vedder Canal, which prevents the river's considerable spring freshet from flooding the surrounding farmlands and towns, and which is part of the drainage system that turned Sumas Lake into Sumas Prairie.

Downstream from the Vedder Crossing Bridge, the Vedder River marks the boundary between Yarrow to the south and Greendale to the north (both are separate semi-rural communities that are now part of the City of Chilliwack).

== History ==
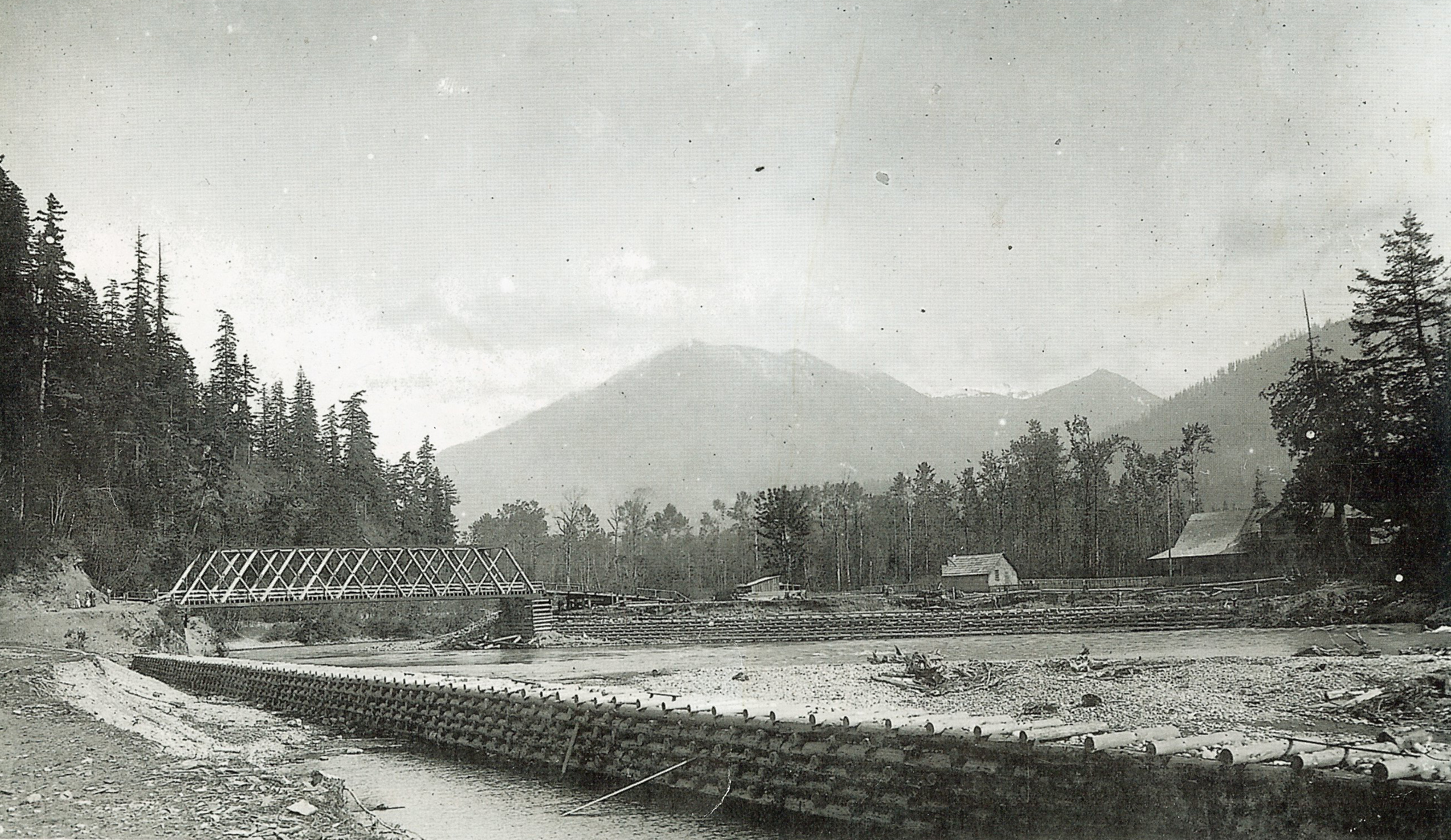
The Vedder River circa 1910

The Chilliwack River was heavily used by the Northwest Boundary Survey of 1857-1862 as a means of accessing the 49th parallel north in order to survey and map the border between American and British-Canadian sovereignty. A number of the Chilliwack's tributaries cross the 49th parallel, including Liumchen Creek, Tamihi Creek, Damfino Creek, Slesse Creek, Nesakwatch Creek, and, from Chilliwack Lake, Klahailhu Creek and Depot Creek. Both American and British surveying parties established base camps on Chilliwack Lake from which they sent field parties through the Chilliwack drainage and east to the Skagit River drainage. In addition, the Whatcom Trail followed much of the Chilliwack River's course.

Historically the Chilliwack River flowed north from Vedder Crossing, over a broad alluvial fan into the Fraser River. In 1875, heavy rains caused a log jam that diverted the river into two small streams called Vedder Creek and Luckakuck Creek, which caused hardship for the area's farmers. In 1882, a new log jam was deliberately created which caused the waters of several streams to shift course toward the west, flowing into the now-disappeared Sumas Lake. A freshet in 1894 caused this new course to become permanent, and compounded on the devastating 1894 Fraser basin flood.

In the early 20th century, the diverted river was diked and channelized, and the Chilliwack River downstream of the Vedder Crossing was permanently diverted westwards into the Vedder Canal to artificially drain the Sumas Lake, and today the canal are renamed the Vedder River. The former interlaced distributaries of the Chilliwack River below Vedder Crossing are now modified into the Chilliwack Creek, which flows northwest meandrously from Sardis past Downtown Chilliwack to empty into the Fraser River east of the Chilliwack Mountain opposite the islands of the Fraser River Ecological Reserve.

== Recreation ==
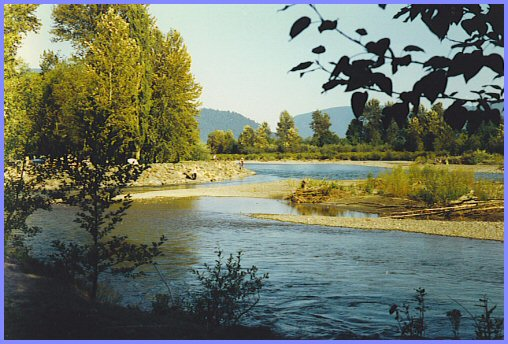
Vedder River Campground

The Vedder/ Chilliwack River is the only river in Canada that sustains navigable class III and above whitewater, making this river a popular year-round whitewater kayaking and river rafting destination. The sections of the river downstream from the Vedder Bridge at Vedder Crossing are very popular amongst locals for relaxing on the river banks, swimming, campfires and sunbathing.

The Vedder River Campground, operated by The Fraser Valley Regional District, is open from April 1 to October 31.

The Vedder-Chilliwack River is well known for its runs of chinook, coho, chum, pink and sockeye salmon in the fall, along with winter and spring steelhead fishing.

The 1954 British Empire and Commonwealth Games' rowing events were held on the Vedder Canal. Canadians Bobby Williams in single sculls, and Donald Guest & Lawrence Stephan in double sculls won bronze medals. Canada won the gold medal in eights rowing.

== Major Tributaries ==
Tributaries in the United States

- Indian Creek
- Bear Creek
- Little Chilliwack River

Tributaries in Canada

- Centre Creek
- Nesakwatch Creek
- Foley Creek
- Chipmunk Creek
- Slesse Creek
- Tamihi Creek
- Liumchen Creek
- Sweltzer River

== See also ==
- List of tributaries of the Fraser River
- List of rivers of British Columbia
