= Georgia Depression =

Glacial depression in the Pacific Northwest of North America

- Depression
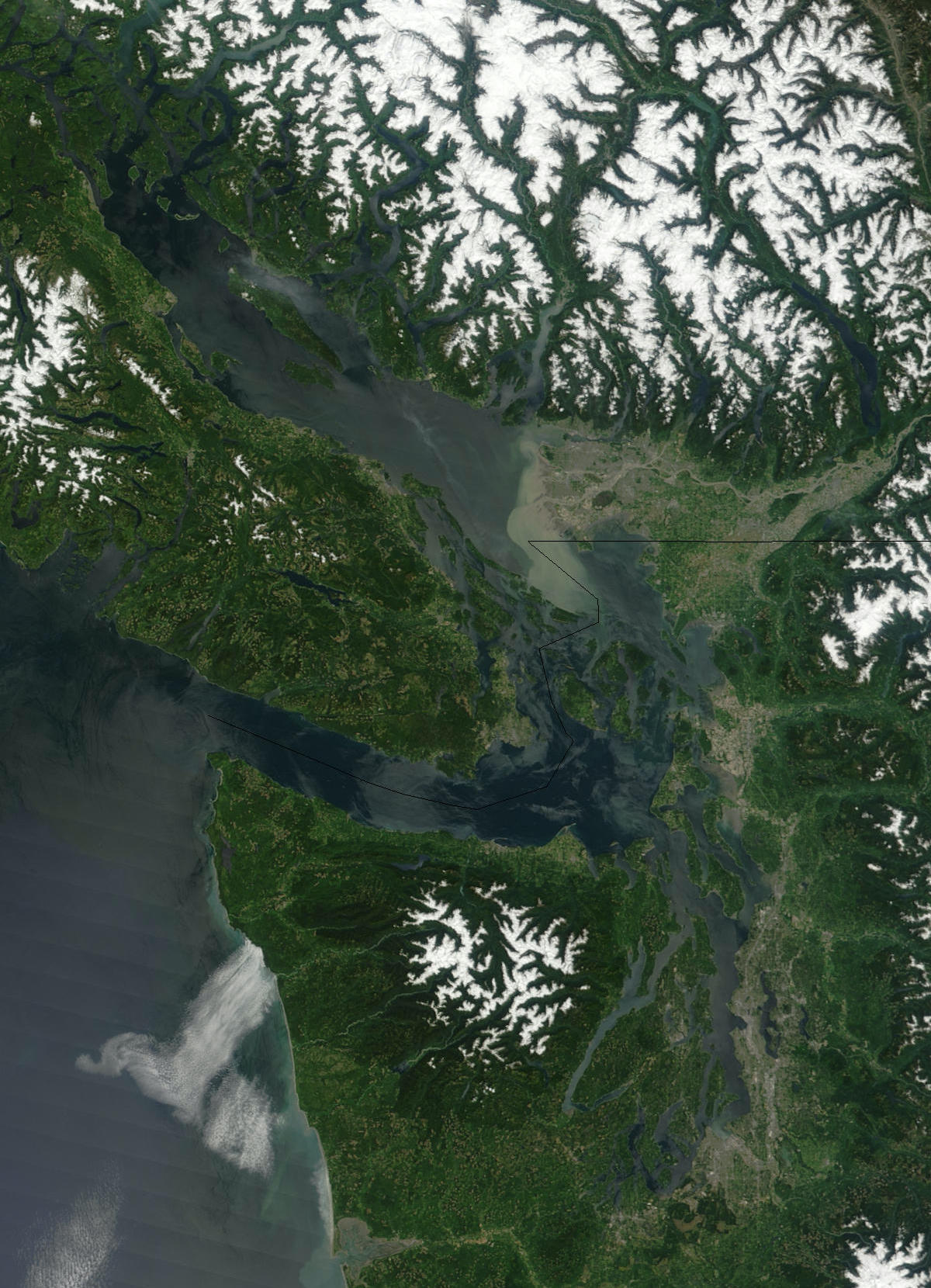
- The coastal lowlands surrounding the Salish Sea make up most of the Georgia Depression

- Topographic map of Washington showing the Georgia Depression in the northwestern corner of the state
- Location: British Columbia, Canada; Washington, United States
- Part of: North American Cordillera
- Geology: Depression

The Georgia Depression is a depression in the Pacific Northwest region of western North America. The depression includes the lowland regions of southwestern British Columbia and northwestern Washington along the shores of the Salish Sea.

== Formation ==
The Georgia Depression was formed out of the collision of continental plates about 150 million years ago. During this period, the depression manifested as a broad valley with various rivers flowing down into it to reach the Pacific Ocean where the mouth of the Strait of Juan de Fuca lies.

Much of the current topography was formed through the erosion of the depression by the Cordilleran Ice Sheet during the Vashon Glaciation, which lasted from about 19,000 – 16,000 BP. The retreat of the ice sheet revealed a scarred landscape that filled in with sea water once it had retreated beyond what is now the Strait of Juan de Fuca, forming the Salish Sea.

== Geography ==
The Georgia Depression is encompassed by the Pacific Ranges to the north, Vancouver Island Ranges and Olympic Mountains to the west, and North Cascades to the east. The depression includes the Fraser Lowland, Nanaimo and Nahwitti lowlands of Vancouver Island, Puget Sound basin, and all the islands and adjoining waterways of the Salish Sea.

The majority of the population of British Columbia and Washington reside within this depression.

== Geology ==
The landscape features glacially striated tablelands and rolling hills underlain by sedimentary rocks. The majority of soils in the depression are formed from glacial till, glacial outwash, and Lacustrine deposits.

== Ecology ==
Much of the Georgia Depression is dry, flat, and at low elevation relative to the surrounding highlands. As such, a wide diversity of flora and fauna thrive within the depression.

Human activity has greatly altered much of the natural environment here through industrialization, agriculture, forestry, urbanization, and suburban sprawl.

== See also ==
- List of physiogeographic regions of British Columbia
- Royal eponyms in Canada
