= Geoffrey Chadsey =

American painter (born 1967)

- Born: March 23, 1967 (age 59); Philadelphia, Pennsylvania
- Education: Harvard University, California College of the Arts

Portrait II by Geoffrey Chadsey, 2000, red and blue watercolor pencil on vellum paper, Honolulu Museum of Art

Geoffrey Chadsey (born March 23, 1967) is an American artist known for his painting and drawings, based in Brooklyn, New York. He is best known for his depictions of men, consisting of dense curving and parallel lines reminiscent of engraving to delineate imperfect bodies that often shift between genders.

== Biography ==
Chadsey was born in Philadelphia, Pennsylvania. In 1989, he received an AB in visual and environmental studies from Harvard University, and in 1995, an MFA in Photography and Drawing from California College of the Arts.

His conspicuously flawed bodies are often androgynous, as in Portrait II, in the collection of the Honolulu Museum of Art. The Honolulu Museum of Art and the San Francisco Museum of Modern Art are among the public collections holding work by Geoffrey Chadsey.
