= Slesse Creek =

Coordinates: 49°04′41″N 121°42′31″W

Slesse Creek Silesia Creek
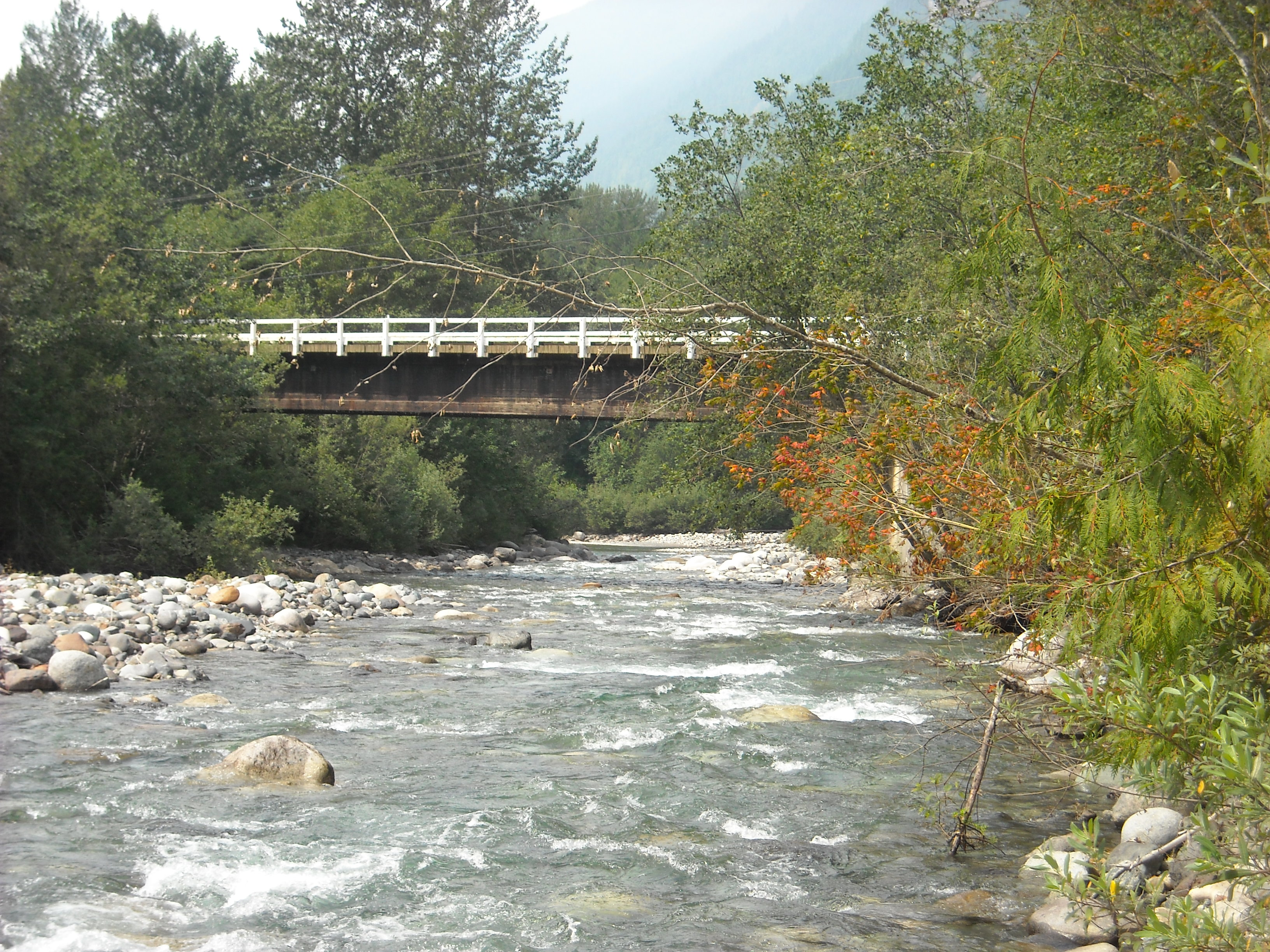

Location
- Countries: United States and Canada
- State: Washington
- Province: British Columbia
- County: Whatcom County, WA

Physical characteristics
- Source: Confluence of East and Middle Forks
  - location: North Cascades
- Mouth: Chilliwack River

Slesse Creek is a tributary of the Chilliwack River in North America. It flows through Whatcom County in the U.S. state of Washington and through the Canadian province of British Columbia. The creek is known as Silesia Creek in the United States and as Slesse Creek in Canada.

== East Fork ==
The East Fork begins in tiny Egg Lake and flows north then northwest until it converges with the Middle Fork to form Silesia Creek Proper.

== Middle Fork ==
The Middle Fork begins at an unnamed ridge just west of Egg Lake and flows northwest then north until it converges with the East Fork to form Silesia Creek Proper.

== West Fork ==
The West Fork begins near Mamie Pass and flows north until it picks up the waters of Winchester Creek. It then turns east until it merges with Silesia Creek Proper. It flows over a waterfall just above its mouth.

== Mainstream ==
Originating at the confluence of the East and Middle Forks, the creek flows northwest almost all the way to the Chilliwack River. It receives one major tributary, that being Rapid Creek, which it gets about halfway between its source and the West Fork. It crosses the border about ¼ of the way there and at that point its name changes to Slesse Creek.

== See also ==
- List of rivers in Washington
- List of rivers of British Columbia
- Slesse Mountain
