= Sumas 2 =

Coordinates: 48.995°N 122.275°W

Sumas 2 was a proposal for an additional cogeneration electric power plant in the town of Sumas, Washington near the Canada–United States border. The excess heat from this generator was to be used by a wood products processing company. The original proposal came in 1999, and was revised twice in 2000 and 2001. It was approved in 2004 by the governor of Washington state. A power transmission line was to be constructed to a sub-station in Abbotsford, British Columbia but the Canadian National Energy Board in 2004 and the Supreme Court of Canada in 2006 denied permission to construct the transmission line. Sumas Energy 2.inc, the company behind the proposal, requested that the Washington's Energy Facility Site Evaluation Council terminate their Site Certification Agreement. This occurred in April 2006.

There is already a cogeneration plant in Sumas [SE1]. This proposal would have added a second plant [SE2]. This proposal was considered controversial because it burns natural gas to generate power and the resulting pollutants would have drifted up the valley, adding to pollution already generated by the populous Lower Mainland of British Columbia, which includes Vancouver.

The proposed second plant would be five times larger than the existing plant. The proposed site was over an active fault, placing the proposed 16 inch high pressure natural gas line and tanks containing hazardous fuels and chemicals in danger. A high pressure natural gas line had just recently exploded in the foothills near the proposed site due to shifting soils. An aquifer serving much of Whatcom County and Abbotsford, British Columbia is located directly beneath the site.

The site is in a floodplain that has experienced recent floods strong enough to sweep vehicles off roadways. The proposed fill for the plant would displace floodwaters onto neighboring farms and homes, increasing flood depths by up to a foot.

Air emissions from the plant were predicted to be up to 3 tons per day of criteria pollutants.

The Washington State Energy Facility Site Evaluation Council initially denied the project, but NESCO resubmitted their application for reconsideration without the diesel component that was contained in their initial application.

The National Energy Board received approximately 25,000 letters regarding the project, mostly in opposition.
