= Chadsey Lake =

Lake in British Columbia, Canada

- Location within British Columbia
- Location: Abbotsford, British Columbia
- Coordinates: 49°07′25″N 122°08′35″W
- Basin countries: Canada
- Max. length: 360 m (1,180 ft)
- Max. width: 240 m (790 ft)
- Surface elevation: Approx. 660 m (2,170 ft)

Chadsey Lake is located on Sumas Mountain near Abbotsford, British Columbia.

== Name ==
Chadsey Creek flows into the lake and was named in 1939, after pioneer William Harvey Chadsey, son of William Chadsey and Mary Jane Town (One undated provincial reference map marks it as "Lost Creek").

Chadsey died at Chilliwack General Hospital on July 16, 1940 at age 73. He was the third of four brothers who farmed in the area in the last half of the 19th Century.

== Location ==
The lake is in the north part of Sumas Mountain Regional Park, on the north-facing slope of Sumas Mountain.

From the starting point at Batt Road, it is about a 5 km hike to the lake. In the middle of the lake, there is an island.

By Batt Road there is a motor biking trail. Then there is a small hill where people climb and enter the wooded area leading to the lake.

== See also ==
- List of lakes of British Columbia
