= Tedder =

Tedder is a surname. Notable people with the surname include:

- Arthur Tedder, 1st Baron Tedder (1890–1967), British air marshal
- Ernest Tedder (1915–1972), English cricketer
- Henry Richard Tedder (1850–1924), English librarian
- Joe Tedder (born 1962), American politician from Florida
- John Tedder, 2nd Baron Tedder (1926–1994), professor of Chemistry
- Richard Tedder (born 1946), English virologist and microbiologist
- Ryan Tedder (born 1979), American singer-songwriter
- Thomas Tedder (1956–2024), American immunologist

== See also ==
- Tedder, Florida
- Tedder (machine), used in hay making
- Teder, surname
