= Chilliwack Mountain =

Mountain in British Columbia, Canada

- Location within British Columbia

Highest point
- Elevation: 340+ m (1115+ ft)
- Coordinates: 49°09′18″N 122°01′03″W

Geography
- Location: British Columbia
- Topo map: NTS 92G1 Mission

Chilliwack Mountain is a small mountain rising from the floodplain of the Fraser River in the city of Chilliwack, British Columbia, Canada. Located on the south side of the Fraser opposite the north side community of Deroche, it lies just west of the downtown of Chilliwack and to the east of Greendale, a rural neighbourhood of Chilliwack near its western boundary.

== Twentieth century ==
Mostly forested, the mountain has become the site of upscale real estate development which was approved by the City of Chilliwack Council in the Chilliwack Mountain Comprehensive Development Plan of 1996 for the development of a suburban community scenario that would lead to a build-out population of 4,500, or 1,700 dwelling units. The report addresses environmentally and geotechnically sensitive areas that need to be treated with due care.
