= Vedder Crossing, Chilliwack =

Vedder Crossing
- Neighbourhood in Chilliwack
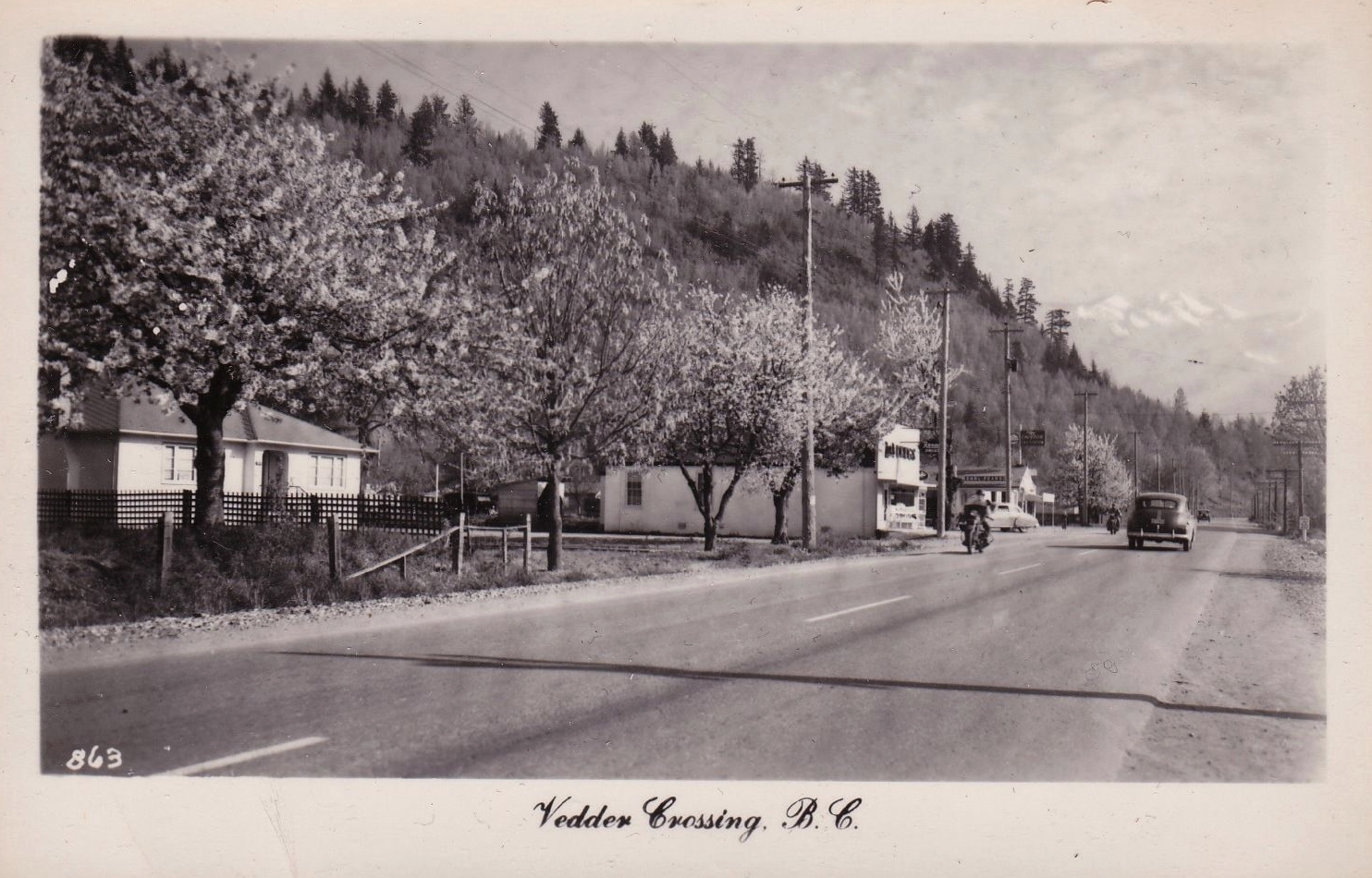
- Vedder Crossing, BC, c.1952

- Location of Vedder Crossing in British Columbia
- Coordinates: 49°06′00″N 121°58′00″W
- City: Chilliwack
- Province: British Columbia
- Country: Canada
- Time zone: UTC-8 (PST)
  - Summer (DST): UTC-7 (PDT)
- Postal code: V2P
- Area code: +1-604

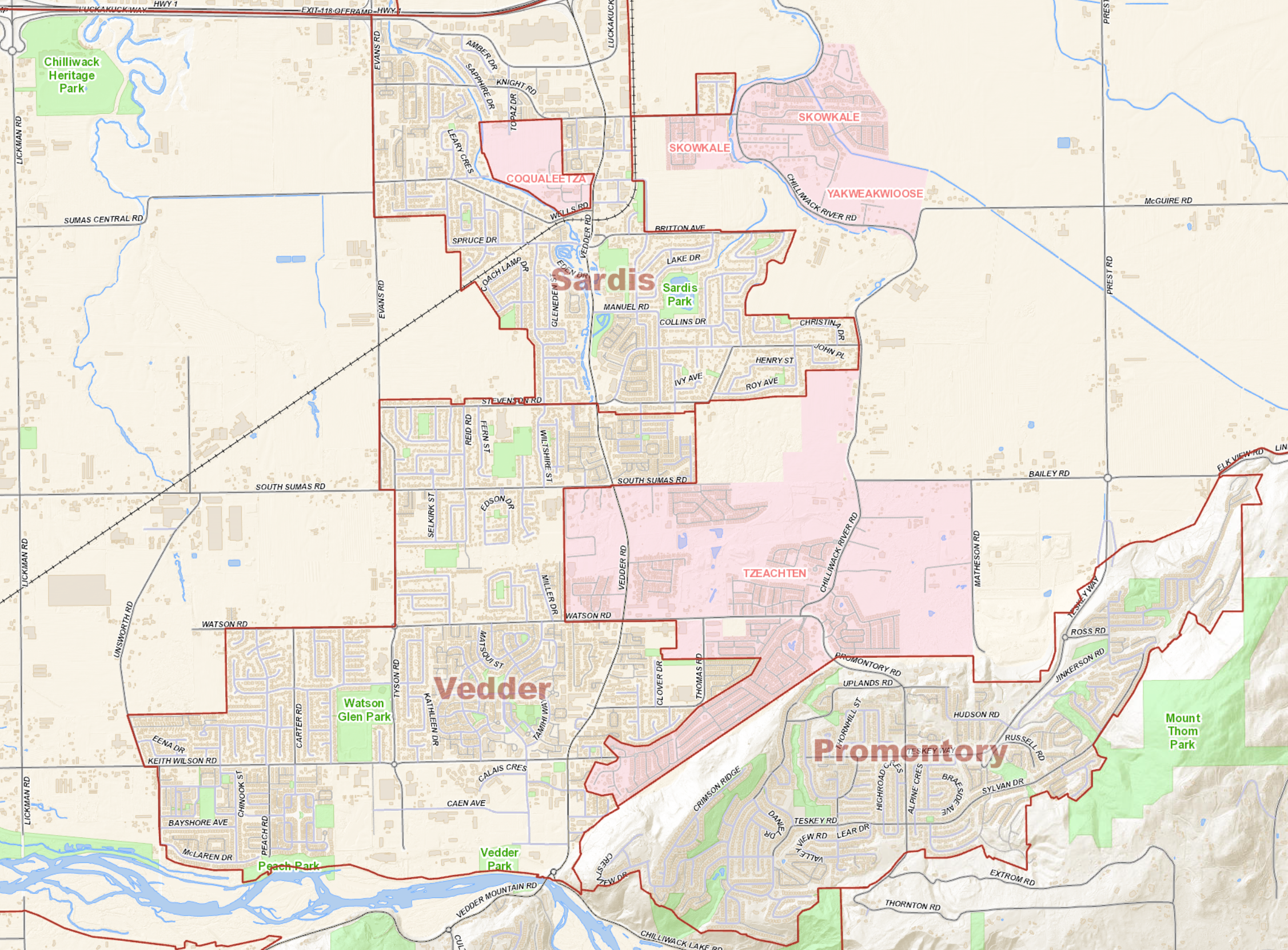
Sardis & Vedder Neighbourhood Map

Vedder Crossing is adjacent to the junction of the Chilliwack and Vedder Rivers at its southern boundary, and Stevenson Road to the north.

== History ==
The area was sparsely populated until about 1941 when CFB Chilliwack was established (then called Camp Chilliwack) between Watson Road and Keith Wilson. The base became a major training facility for the Canadian Army until its closing in 1997. Part of CFB Chilliwack became a residential subdivision known as Garrison Crossing, and its training facilities became the Canada Education Park, a local campus for the University of the Fraser Valley. The Chilcotin Training Area, better known as the OPSEE Area (Operator Special Engineering Equipment Training Area), is still operational and is part of Western Area Training Centre (WATC). The OPSEE Area is used by the Primary Reserves units of British Columbia for field training and for the use of its firing ranges. The ASU is also used by Cadets for field training. The ASU also houses supply depots for the Canadian Army units of 39 Canadian Brigade Group, and the cadet units of BC. The old quartermaster warehouse is now the Canadian Military Education Centre Museum.

== See also ==
- CFB Chilliwack
- City of Chilliwack
- Neighbourhoods in Chilliwack
- Sardis
