= Fraser Valley =

Geographical region in British Columbia

- Valley
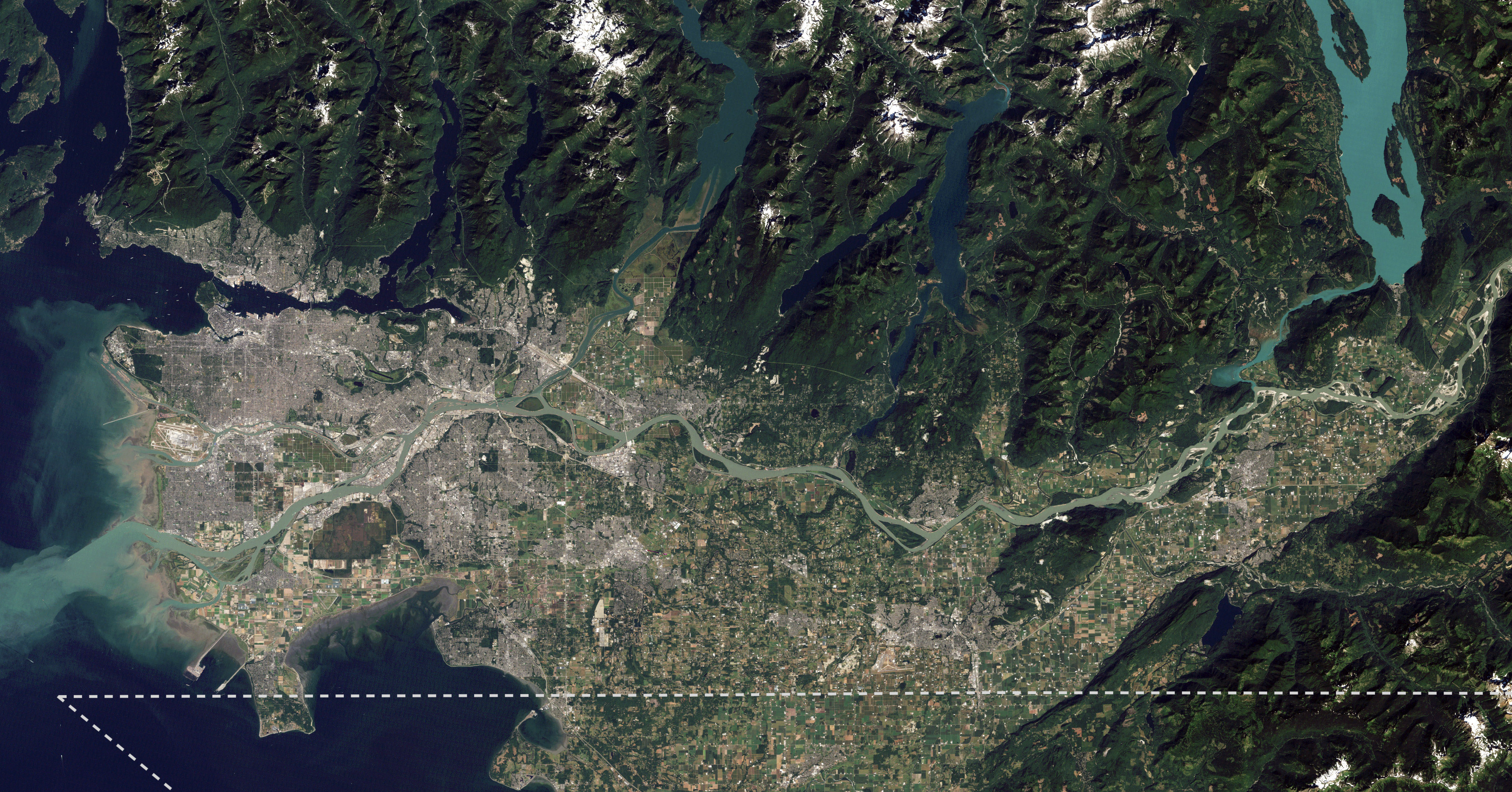
- Landsat image of Fraser Valley. Sediment deposited by the Fraser River is clearly visible to the west.

- Location within British Columbia
- Coordinates: 49°06′30″N 122°17′30″W
- Location: British Columbia, Canada
- Part of: Fraser Lowland
- Formed by: Fraser River

The Fraser Valley is a geographical region in southwestern British Columbia, Canada and northwestern Washington State. It starts just west of Hope in a narrow valley encompassing the Fraser River and ends at the Pacific Ocean stretching from the North Shore Mountains, opposite the city of Vancouver, BC, to just south of Bellingham, Washington in the United States.

In casual usage, the Fraser Valley typically describes the Fraser River basin downstream of the Fraser Canyon. The term is sometimes used outside British Columbia to refer to all Fraser River sections, including the Fraser Canyon and up from there to its headwaters, but in general, British Columbian usage of the term refers to the stretch of Lower Mainland west of the Coquihalla River mouth at the inland town of Hope, and includes all of the Canadian portion of the Fraser Lowland as well as the valleys and upland areas flanking it. It is divided into the Upper Fraser Valley and Lower Fraser Valley by the Vedder River mouth at the eastern foothills of Sumas Mountain, although the Lower Valley section upstream of McMillan Island and the Salmon River mouth (at Fort Langley) used to be called the Central Fraser Valley up until 1995 (see Central Fraser Valley Regional District).

Administratively, the Fraser Valley comprises parts of the regional districts of Metro Vancouver and the Fraser Valley Regional District. The main population centres in the Fraser Valley are Greater Vancouver, Abbotsford and Chilliwack.

== History ==
Evolution of the Lower Fraser Valley from Langley to Harrison

This section of the Fraser River is known by local indigenous peoples as "Sto:lo" in the Halqemeylem language of the area, and this term has been adopted to refer to all of the Indigenous peoples of the Fraser Lowland, other than the Squamish and Musqueam. The Indigenous peoples of the area have long made use of the river valley for agricultural and commercial purposes and continue to do so today.

The Indigenous people were not consulted in the Treaty of Oregon, which saw the United States and Great Britain define and recognize each other's claims to the area. This overstepping of jurisdiction inevitably led to conflict as Great Britain was incapable of exercising the control they claimed over the river valley. As a wave of immigrants flooded into the Fraser River Valley because of the Fraser Canyon Gold Rush, the British were unable to maintain order without the cooperation of the local Indigenous peoples, and the Fraser Canyon War broke out. The war was resolved with a series of treaties, none of which remain to this day, but which evidently included the regulation of immigration and the continuation of mining on the river by the Indigenous inhabitants and the new immigrants. This war was part of a series of local conflicts surrounding the arrival of settlers ahead of American and British capacity to maintain order and refusal to cooperate with or recognize indigenous land claims and demands. These conflicts were pivotal in many aspects to the settlement of the West Coast in both Canada and the United States.

The interaction of Indigenous peoples and settlers led to the growth of Chinook Wawa, a pidgin language that was used throughout the Fraser River Valley until the early 1900s. Industrialization of the river began with the use of the traditional trade waterway by steamboats and eventually, roads and railways were built, fueled by and in turn fuelling further population growth. Today, the most important transportation through the region are the Canadian Pacific Railway and Canadian National Railway transcontinental main lines, the Lougheed Highway (Hwy 7), and the Trans-Canada Highway (Hwy 1).

== Geography ==
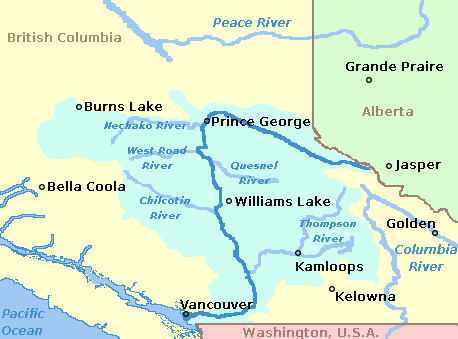
Map showing the Fraser River and its major tributaries

After descending through the rapids of the Fraser Canyon, the Fraser River emerges almost at sea level at Yale, over 100 km inland. Although the canyon in geographic terms is defined as ending at Yale, Hope is generally considered the southern end of the canyon, partly because of the change in the character of the highway from that point, and perhaps also because it is at Hope that the first floodplains typifying the course of the Lower Fraser are found. Downstream from Hope, the river and adjoining floodplains widen considerably in the area of Rosedale, Chilliwack and Agassiz, which is considered the head of the Fraser Delta. From there, the river passes through some of the most fertile agricultural land in British Columbia—as well as the heart of the Metro Vancouver region—on its way through the valley to its mouth at Georgia Strait.

During the last ice age, the area that would become the Fraser Valley was covered by a sheet of ice, walled in by the surrounding mountains. As the ice receded, land that had been covered by glaciers became covered by water instead, then slowly rose above the water, forming the basin that exists today. The valley is the largest landform of the Lower Mainland ecoregion, with its delta considered to begin in the area of Agassiz and Chilliwack, although stretches of floodplain flank the mountainsides between there and Hope.

Several of the Fraser's lower tributaries have floodplains of their own, shared in common with the Fraser freshet. Of varying size these include the Harrison River, Chilliwack River (Vedder River), Hatzic Creek and Hatzic Lake, the Stave, Alouette, Pitt and Coquitlam Rivers. Also incorporated in the Fraser delta region are the Nicomekl and Serpentine River floodplains and the Sumas River drainage, which flow to saltwater independently of the Fraser but help drain its lowland. The Fraser is tidal as far upstream as the town of Mission and, across the river, the City of Abbotsford, which is at the Fraser's closest approach to the international boundary, about 6 miles north of Sumas, Washington. Pitt Lake, one of the Fraser's last tributaries and among its largest, is so low in elevation, despite its mountain setting, that it is one of the largest tidal freshwater lakes in the world.

Oxbow lakes and side-sloughs are a common feature of the Lower Fraser's geography. The two main oxbows are those of Hatzic Lake and the Stave River on opposite sides of Mission, although that of the Stave has been silted in and part of it drained for a man-made lake. Around Fort Langley is an oxbow formation, mostly swamped in at the time of the fort's foundation, which was drained and made part of the fort's farm and remains farmland today. The system of sloughs and side-channels of the river is complicated, but important sloughs include those around Nicomen Island, Sea Bird Island and flanking the river from Rosedale to Sumas Mountain, on the western side of Chilliwack.

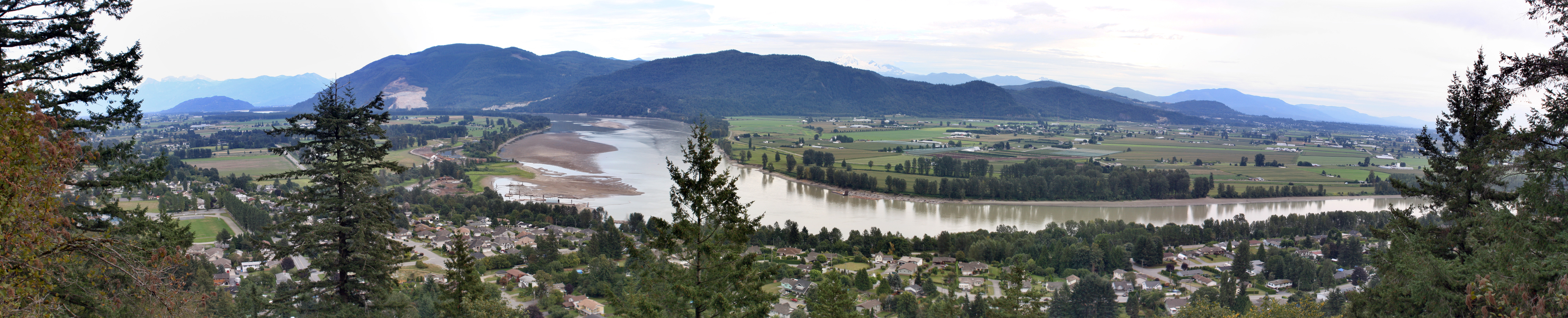
Panoramic view of Fraser River and valley as seen from the grounds of Westminster Abbey, above Hatzic in Mission, British Columbia

== Climate ==
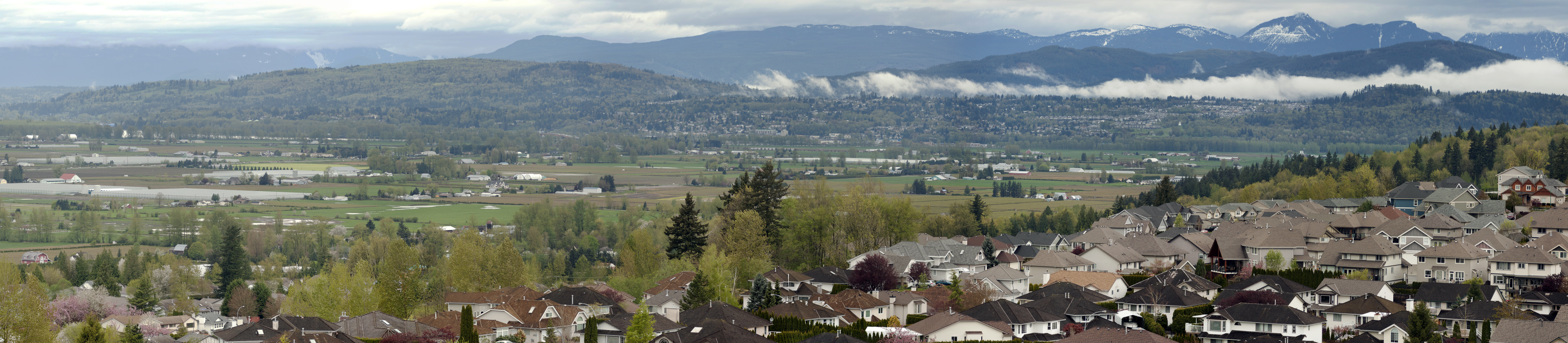
Panoramic view of the Fraser Valley as seen from eastern Abbotsford looking northwest, showing the District of Mission, which lies across the river from this viewpoint

In winter, the Fraser Valley occasionally plays a significant role in the weather regime along the west coast of North America as far south as California, acting as a natural outlet for the intensely cold Arctic air mass which typically sits over Western Canada during winter. Under certain meteorological conditions, strong winds pour out of the Fraser Valley and over the relatively warmer waters of the Strait of Georgia and the Strait of Juan de Fuca. This can cause ocean-effect snow, especially between Port Angeles and Sequim, where the air mass collides with the Olympic Mountains. The cold air from the Fraser Valley can also flow out over the Pacific Ocean. Lanes of convective ocean-effect clouds and showers are produced as heat and moisture modify the very dry, frigid air mass. These then typically organize as a low pressure system which returns the showers to the coast south of Canada, often bringing snow to unusually low elevations.

=== Western Fraser Valley ===
Climate data for Western Fraser Valley (Maple Ridge Kanaka Creek) (1981–2010)
Month	Jan	Feb	Mar	Apr	May	Jun	Jul	Aug	Sep	Oct	Nov	Dec	Year
Record high °C (°F)	14.5 (58.1)	20.0 (68.0)	25.5 (77.9)	29.5 (85.1)	31.0 (87.8)	34.0 (93.2)	36.5 (97.7)	34.5 (94.1)	35.5 (95.9)	27.5 (81.5)	16.0 (60.8)	13.5 (56.3)	36.5 (97.7)
Mean daily maximum °C (°F)	5.0 (41.0)	7.8 (46.0)	10.9 (51.6)	14.9 (58.8)	17.9 (64.2)	20.5 (68.9)	23.8 (74.8)	24.1 (75.4)	21.1 (70.0)	14.1 (57.4)	8.1 (46.6)	4.6 (40.3)	14.4 (57.9)
Daily mean °C (°F)	2.5 (36.5)	4.0 (39.2)	6.5 (43.7)	9.6 (49.3)	12.5 (54.5)	15.2 (59.4)	17.7 (63.9)	17.8 (64.0)	15.0 (59.0)	10.0 (50.0)	5.4 (41.7)	2.4 (36.3)	9.9 (49.8)
Mean daily minimum °C (°F)	0.0 (32.0)	0.1 (32.2)	1.9 (35.4)	4.3 (39.7)	7.1 (44.8)	9.9 (49.8)	11.7 (53.1)	11.6 (52.9)	8.9 (48.0)	5.9 (42.6)	2.8 (37.0)	0.2 (32.4)	5.4 (41.7)
Record low °C (°F)	−17 (1)	−13.5 (7.7)	−9 (16)	−2.5 (27.5)	−1 (30)	2.5 (36.5)	5.0 (41.0)	5.0 (41.0)	1.0 (33.8)	−6 (21)	−13 (9)	−17.5 (0.5)	−17.5 (0.5)
Average precipitation mm (inches)	275.8 (10.86)	146.1 (5.75)	174.3 (6.86)	144.1 (5.67)	132.5 (5.22)	90.0 (3.54)	59.4 (2.34)	63.3 (2.49)	82.5 (3.25)	189.0 (7.44)	308.2 (12.13)	236.7 (9.32)	1,901.9 (74.88)
Average rainfall mm (inches)	252.4 (9.94)	138.2 (5.44)	167.9 (6.61)	144.0 (5.67)	132.4 (5.21)	90.0 (3.54)	59.4 (2.34)	63.3 (2.49)	82.5 (3.25)	188.9 (7.44)	301.8 (11.88)	218.6 (8.61)	1,839.4 (72.42)
Average snowfall cm (inches)	11.1 (4.4)	23.4 (9.2)	6.4 (2.5)	0.1 (0.0)	0.1 (0.0)	0.0 (0.0)	0.0 (0.0)	0.0 (0.0)	0.0 (0.0)	0.1 (0.0)	6.4 (2.5)	18.1 (7.1)	62.5 (24.6)
Average precipitation days (≥ 0.2 mm)	21.0	15.4	20.0	17.7	16.0	13.4	9.0	8.1	9.1	16.8	21.3	20.5	188.1
Average rainy days (≥ 0.2 mm)	19.9	14.6	19.4	17.7	16.0	13.4	9.0	8.1	9.1	16.8	20.9	19.1	184
Average snowy days (≥ 0.2 cm)	4.1	2.0	1.6	0.05	0.05	0.0	0.0	0.0	0.0	0.05	1.3	3.6	12.75
Source: Environment Canada

Climate data for Western Fraser Valley (Langley) (1971–2000)
Month	Jan	Feb	Mar	Apr	May	Jun	Jul	Aug	Sep	Oct	Nov	Dec	Year
Record high °C (°F)	15 (59)	18.5 (65.3)	20 (68)	24.4 (75.9)	34 (93)	40.0 (104.0)	35.6 (96.1)	36.1 (97.0)	33.3 (91.9)	27.5 (81.5)	19 (66)	16.1 (61.0)	40.0 (104.0)
Mean daily maximum °C (°F)	5 (41)	7.6 (45.7)	10.5 (50.9)	13.3 (55.9)	16.8 (62.2)	19.3 (66.7)	22.6 (72.7)	22.8 (73.0)	19.6 (67.3)	14.1 (57.4)	8.1 (46.6)	5.3 (41.5)	13.8 (56.7)
Daily mean °C (°F)	2.2 (36.0)	4.4 (39.9)	6.3 (43.3)	8.6 (47.5)	11.8 (53.2)	14.2 (57.6)	16.7 (62.1)	17.0 (62.6)	14.2 (57.6)	9.8 (49.6)	5.1 (41.2)	2.7 (36.9)	9.4 (49.0)
Mean daily minimum °C (°F)	−0.6 (30.9)	1.2 (34.2)	2.2 (36.0)	3.8 (38.8)	6.7 (44.1)	9.2 (48.6)	10.8 (51.4)	11.1 (52.0)	8.8 (47.8)	5.6 (42.1)	2.1 (35.8)	0.1 (32.2)	5.1 (41.2)
Record low °C (°F)	−14 (7)	−12 (10)	−8.3 (17.1)	−2.8 (27.0)	−0.6 (30.9)	1.7 (35.1)	3.9 (39.0)	3.3 (37.9)	−1.7 (28.9)	−7 (19)	−16 (3)	−19.4 (−2.9)	−19.4 (−2.9)
Average precipitation mm (inches)	176 (6.9)	172.1 (6.78)	135.2 (5.32)	102.7 (4.04)	82.8 (3.26)	72.9 (2.87)	52.7 (2.07)	56.4 (2.22)	76.4 (3.01)	141 (5.6)	207.5 (8.17)	211.3 (8.32)	1,486.9 (58.54)
Average rainfall mm (inches)	153.0 (6.02)	156.4 (6.16)	131.4 (5.17)	102.1 (4.02)	82.8 (3.26)	72.9 (2.87)	52.7 (2.07)	56.4 (2.22)	76.4 (3.01)	140.7 (5.54)	200.8 (7.91)	193.4 (7.61)	1,419 (55.86)
Average snowfall cm (inches)	23.0 (9.1)	15.8 (6.2)	3.8 (1.5)	0.6 (0.2)	0 (0)	0 (0)	0 (0)	0 (0)	0 (0)	0.3 (0.1)	6.7 (2.6)	17.9 (7.0)	68.1 (26.7)
Average precipitation days (≥ 0.2 mm)	17.5	17.7	17.2	15.3	14.1	12.3	7.6	8.3	11.0	15.5	19.5	18.3	174.3
Average rainy days	15.5	16.3	16.9	15.3	14.1	12.3	7.6	8.3	11.0	15.5	18.8	16.5	168.1
Average snowy days (≥ 0.2 cm)	3.3	2.2	1.1	0.1	0	0	0	0	0	0.1	1.2	3.1	11.1
Source: Environment Canada

Climate data for Western Fraser Valley Abbotsford International Airport (1981–2010)
Month	Jan	Feb	Mar	Apr	May	Jun	Jul	Aug	Sep	Oct	Nov	Dec	Year
Record high humidex	18.8	20.0	24.8	31.2	39.5	49.8	46.2	43.4	40.1	31.2	21.0	18.9	49.8
Record high °C (°F)	18.1 (64.6)	20.6 (69.1)	24.9 (76.8)	29.8 (85.6)	36.0 (96.8)	42.9 (109.2)	38.0 (100.4)	36.3 (97.3)	37.5 (99.5)	29.3 (84.7)	22.4 (72.3)	18.2 (64.8)	42.9 (109.2)
Mean daily maximum °C (°F)	6.7 (44.1)	9.0 (48.2)	11.6 (52.9)	14.7 (58.5)	18.1 (64.6)	20.8 (69.4)	24.0 (75.2)	24.4 (75.9)	21.3 (70.3)	15.0 (59.0)	9.3 (48.7)	5.9 (42.6)	15.1 (59.2)
Daily mean °C (°F)	3.6 (38.5)	5.0 (41.0)	7.2 (45.0)	9.8 (49.6)	13.0 (55.4)	15.7 (60.3)	18.1 (64.6)	18.2 (64.8)	15.3 (59.5)	10.5 (50.9)	6.0 (42.8)	2.9 (37.2)	10.4 (50.7)
Mean daily minimum °C (°F)	0.4 (32.7)	1.1 (34.0)	2.7 (36.9)	4.8 (40.6)	7.8 (46.0)	10.5 (50.9)	12.2 (54.0)	12.0 (53.6)	9.3 (48.7)	5.9 (42.6)	2.7 (36.9)	−0.1 (31.8)	5.8 (42.4)
Record low °C (°F)	−21.1 (−6.0)	−18.9 (−2.0)	−12.8 (9.0)	−4.4 (24.1)	−2.2 (28.0)	1.1 (34.0)	2.2 (36.0)	3.3 (37.9)	−1.7 (28.9)	−7.5 (18.5)	−16.7 (1.9)	−20.0 (−4.0)	−21.1 (−6.0)
Record low wind chill	−26.6	−29.6	−19.7	−7.3	−4	0.0	0.0	0.0	−5.4	−13.9	−27.6	−33.3	−33.3
Average precipitation mm (inches)	211.7 (8.33)	132.3 (5.21)	149.3 (5.88)	117.8 (4.64)	99.8 (3.93)	74.8 (2.94)	43.2 (1.70)	45.9 (1.81)	75.5 (2.97)	152.7 (6.01)	248.2 (9.77)	186.6 (7.35)	1,537.8 (60.54)
Average rainfall mm (inches)	193.6 (7.62)	123.4 (4.86)	144.9 (5.70)	117.1 (4.61)	99.8 (3.93)	74.8 (2.94)	43.2 (1.70)	45.9 (1.81)	75.5 (2.97)	152.7 (6.01)	241.5 (9.51)	170.9 (6.73)	1,483.3 (58.40)
Average snowfall cm (inches)	18.5 (7.3)	8.6 (3.4)	4.4 (1.7)	0.5 (0.2)	0.0 (0.0)	0.0 (0.0)	0.0 (0.0)	0.0 (0.0)	0.0 (0.0)	0.0 (0.0)	6.7 (2.6)	16.5 (6.5)	55.2 (21.7)
Average precipitation days (≥ 0.2 mm)	20.1	16.2	19.1	16.3	14.4	13.0	7.3	7.1	9.6	15.8	20.8	19.8	179.5
Average rainy days (≥ 0.2 mm)	18.2	15.4	18.6	16.3	14.4	13.0	7.3	7.1	9.6	15.8	20.2	18.2	174.1
Average snowy days (≥ 0.2 cm)	3.7	1.9	1.4	0.3	0.0	0.0	0.0	0.0	0.0	0.0	1.3	3.6	12.2
Average relative humidity (%) (at 3pm)	73.3	62.9	59.9	56.0	56.5	57.1	54.5	53.2	56.4	66.1	74.3	74.5	62.1
Mean monthly sunshine hours	68.3	99.0	131.5	171.5	208.7	213.7	276.7	263.2	201.9	122.6	64.7	64.9	1,886.7
Percentage possible sunshine	25.2	34.6	35.7	41.8	44.1	44.2	56.7	59.1	53.3	36.5	23.4	25.2	40.0
Source: Environment Canada

=== Central Fraser Valley ===
Climate data for Central Fraser Valley (Agassiz) (1981–2010)
Month	Jan	Feb	Mar	Apr	May	Jun	Jul	Aug	Sep	Oct	Nov	Dec	Year
Record high °C (°F)	17.2 (63.0)	21.7 (71.1)	25.8 (78.4)	32.2 (90.0)	36.0 (96.8)	41.4 (106.5)	38.3 (100.9)	39.4 (102.9)	36.8 (98.2)	28.3 (82.9)	21.1 (70.0)	17.2 (63.0)	41.4 (106.5)
Mean daily maximum °C (°F)	6.2 (43.2)	8.5 (47.3)	11.6 (52.9)	15.0 (59.0)	18.5 (65.3)	21.1 (70.0)	24.0 (75.2)	24.6 (76.3)	21.3 (70.3)	15.0 (59.0)	8.9 (48.0)	5.8 (42.4)	15.0 (59.0)
Daily mean °C (°F)	3.4 (38.1)	5.1 (41.2)	7.5 (45.5)	10.4 (50.7)	13.6 (56.5)	16.2 (61.2)	18.5 (65.3)	18.7 (65.7)	15.9 (60.6)	11.0 (51.8)	6.1 (43.0)	3.2 (37.8)	10.8 (51.4)
Mean daily minimum °C (°F)	0.5 (32.9)	1.6 (34.9)	3.4 (38.1)	5.6 (42.1)	8.8 (47.8)	11.3 (52.3)	12.8 (55.0)	12.8 (55.0)	10.3 (50.5)	6.9 (44.4)	3.2 (37.8)	0.5 (32.9)	6.5 (43.7)
Record low °C (°F)	−25.0 (−13.0)	−24.4 (−11.9)	−14.4 (6.1)	−3.9 (25.0)	−1.1 (30.0)	1.7 (35.1)	3.3 (37.9)	1.7 (35.1)	−1.1 (30.0)	−8.5 (16.7)	−19.0 (−2.2)	−21.1 (−6.0)	−25.0 (−13.0)
Average precipitation mm (inches)	240.8 (9.48)	142.1 (5.59)	154.7 (6.09)	125.9 (4.96)	103.0 (4.06)	92.2 (3.63)	66.6 (2.62)	58.2 (2.29)	87.6 (3.45)	191.7 (7.55)	285.0 (11.22)	206.1 (8.11)	1,754.1 (69.06)
Average rainfall mm (inches)	220.8 (8.69)	131.1 (5.16)	148.8 (5.86)	125.5 (4.94)	103.0 (4.06)	92.2 (3.63)	66.6 (2.62)	58.2 (2.29)	87.6 (3.45)	191.6 (7.54)	275.8 (10.86)	187.7 (7.39)	1,688.9 (66.49)
Average snowfall cm (inches)	20.3 (8.0)	12.5 (4.9)	5.8 (2.3)	0.4 (0.2)	0 (0)	0 (0)	0 (0)	0 (0)	0 (0)	0.2 (0.1)	9.2 (3.6)	19.0 (7.5)	67.4 (26.6)
Average precipitation days (≥ 0.2 mm)	19.2	17.3	19.9	17.8	17.1	15.0	10.4	10.1	11.7	17.1	21.3	20.0	196.9
Average rainy days (≥ 0.2 mm)	16.8	15.8	19.6	17.8	17.1	15.0	10.4	10.1	11.7	17.1	20.7	18.1	190.1
Average snowy days (≥ 0.2 cm)	4.6	2.8	1.0	0.2	0	0	0	0	0	0.07	1.3	3.9	13.87
Mean monthly sunshine hours	57.8	85.7	127.7	163.9	194.2	195.6	255.8	242.2	196.8	122.2	60.2	53.6	1,755.6
Source: Environment Canada

Climate data for Central Fraser Valley (Chilliwack Airport) (1981–2010)
Month	Jan	Feb	Mar	Apr	May	Jun	Jul	Aug	Sep	Oct	Nov	Dec	Year
Record high °C (°F)	18.3 (64.9)	20.6 (69.1)	25.8 (78.4)	32.2 (90.0)	34.5 (94.1)	43.7 (110.7)	38.0 (100.4)	39.4 (102.9)	36.5 (97.7)	27.8 (82.0)	21.1 (70.0)	19.0 (66.2)	43.7 (110.7)
Mean daily maximum °C (°F)	6.1 (43.0)	8.8 (47.8)	11.8 (53.2)	15.8 (60.4)	19.1 (66.4)	21.7 (71.1)	25.0 (77.0)	25.3 (77.5)	22.3 (72.1)	15.3 (59.5)	9.3 (48.7)	6.0 (42.8)	15.5 (59.9)
Daily mean °C (°F)	3.3 (37.9)	4.9 (40.8)	7.3 (45.1)	10.5 (50.9)	13.7 (56.7)	16.4 (61.5)	18.8 (65.8)	18.7 (65.7)	15.7 (60.3)	10.8 (51.4)	6.2 (43.2)	3.3 (37.9)	10.8 (51.4)
Mean daily minimum °C (°F)	0.4 (32.7)	1.0 (33.8)	2.8 (37.0)	5.2 (41.4)	8.2 (46.8)	11.0 (51.8)	12.5 (54.5)	12.1 (53.8)	9.1 (48.4)	6.4 (43.5)	3.1 (37.6)	0.5 (32.9)	6.0 (42.8)
Record low °C (°F)	−26.7 (−16.1)	−16.7 (1.9)	−14.4 (6.1)	−6.1 (21.0)	−1.7 (28.9)	1.1 (34.0)	3.3 (37.9)	2.8 (37.0)	−2.8 (27.0)	−7.2 (19.0)	−14.4 (6.1)	−21.7 (−7.1)	−26.7 (−16.1)
Average precipitation mm (inches)	233.5 (9.19)	125.8 (4.95)	154.7 (6.09)	116.3 (4.58)	93.1 (3.67)	91.7 (3.61)	48.1 (1.89)	56.7 (2.23)	75.2 (2.96)	178.5 (7.03)	283.8 (11.17)	210.1 (8.27)	1,667.5 (65.65)
Average rainfall mm (inches)	206.9 (8.15)	114.7 (4.52)	143.7 (5.66)	115.2 (4.54)	93.1 (3.67)	91.7 (3.61)	48.1 (1.89)	56.7 (2.23)	75.2 (2.96)	178.4 (7.02)	272.7 (10.74)	185.8 (7.31)	1,582.2 (62.29)
Average snowfall cm (inches)	26.6 (10.5)	11.2 (4.4)	11.0 (4.3)	1.1 (0.4)	0.0 (0.0)	0.0 (0.0)	0.0 (0.0)	0.0 (0.0)	0.0 (0.0)	0.1 (0.0)	11.2 (4.4)	24.3 (9.6)	85.3 (33.6)
Average precipitation days (≥ 0.2 mm)	20.6	15.9	19.7	17.5	15.8	14.6	8.7	8.5	9.9	17.1	21.5	20.1	189.9
Average rainy days (≥ 0.2 mm)	18.6	14.6	19.2	17.5	15.8	14.6	8.7	8.5	9.9	17.1	20.9	18.4	183.8
Average snowy days (≥ 0.2 cm)	5.0	2.9	1.9	0.2	0.0	0.0	0.0	0.0	0.0	0.1	2.0	4.8	16.8
Source 1:
Source 2:

=== Eastern Fraser Valley ===
Climate data for Eastern Fraser Valley (Laidlaw), 1981–2010 normals
Month	Jan	Feb	Mar	Apr	May	Jun	Jul	Aug	Sep	Oct	Nov	Dec	Year
Record high °C (°F)	14.5 (58.1)	18.5 (65.3)	25.0 (77.0)	30.5 (86.9)	37.5 (99.5)	35.0 (95.0)	38.0 (100.4)	37.5 (99.5)	36.5 (97.7)	28.5 (83.3)	17.5 (63.5)	13.5 (56.3)	38.0 (100.4)
Mean daily maximum °C (°F)	4.6 (40.3)	7.5 (45.5)	11.4 (52.5)	15.2 (59.4)	18.5 (65.3)	21.2 (70.2)	24.3 (75.7)	25.0 (77.0)	21.3 (70.3)	14.3 (57.7)	7.7 (45.9)	4.2 (39.6)	14.6 (58.3)
Daily mean °C (°F)	2.2 (36.0)	4.2 (39.6)	7.1 (44.8)	10.2 (50.4)	13.6 (56.5)	16.3 (61.3)	18.8 (65.8)	19.3 (66.7)	16.2 (61.2)	10.7 (51.3)	5.4 (41.7)	2.0 (35.6)	10.5 (50.9)
Mean daily minimum °C (°F)	−0.3 (31.5)	0.9 (33.6)	2.8 (37.0)	5.0 (41.0)	8.5 (47.3)	11.1 (52.0)	13.1 (55.6)	13.3 (55.9)	10.8 (51.4)	6.9 (44.4)	3.0 (37.4)	−0.3 (31.5)	6.2 (43.2)
Record low °C (°F)	−17.0 (1.4)	−18.0 (−0.4)	−8.5 (16.7)	−1.5 (29.3)	0.5 (32.9)	5.0 (41.0)	7.0 (44.6)	7.5 (45.5)	3.0 (37.4)	−10.0 (14.0)	−20.5 (−4.9)	−18.0 (−0.4)	−20.5 (−4.9)
Average precipitation mm (inches)	287.6 (11.32)	194.3 (7.65)	201.2 (7.92)	166.6 (6.56)	131.8 (5.19)	113.8 (4.48)	84.7 (3.33)	64.2 (2.53)	104.7 (4.12)	229.6 (9.04)	352.7 (13.89)	255.8 (10.07)	2,186.8 (86.09)
Average rainfall mm (inches)	262.6 (10.34)	177.7 (7.00)	193.5 (7.62)	165.8 (6.53)	131.8 (5.19)	113.8 (4.48)	84.7 (3.33)	64.2 (2.53)	104.7 (4.12)	228.9 (9.01)	344.8 (13.57)	236.2 (9.30)	2,108.5 (83.01)
Average snowfall cm (inches)	24.9 (9.8)	16.6 (6.5)	7.7 (3.0)	0.8 (0.3)	0.0 (0.0)	0.0 (0.0)	0.0 (0.0)	0.0 (0.0)	0.0 (0.0)	0.6 (0.2)	7.9 (3.1)	19.6 (7.7)	78.2 (30.8)
Average precipitation days (≥ 0.2 mm)	20.7	16.7	19.9	18.0	17.1	14.5	10.5	8.8	11.2	17.5	21.2	18.0	194.2
Average rainy days (≥ 0.2 mm)	18.2	15.2	19.5	18.0	17.1	14.5	10.5	8.8	11.2	17.4	20.7	16.0	187.1
Average snowy days (≥ 0.2 cm)	4.5	2.8	1.1	0.31	0.0	0.0	0.0	0.0	0.0	0.15	1.5	3.9	14.26
Source: Environment Canada

Climate data for Eastern Fraser Valley (Hope Airport), 1981–2010 normals, extremes 1910–present (Note: Extreme high and low temperatures in the table below were recorded at Hope from March 1910 to December 1937 and at Hope Airport from January 1938 to present.)
Month	Jan	Feb	Mar	Apr	May	Jun	Jul	Aug	Sep	Oct	Nov	Dec	Year
Record high °C (°F)	15.0 (59.0)	19.4 (66.9)	25.1 (77.2)	32.2 (90.0)	38.4 (101.1)	41.4 (106.5)	40.6 (105.1)	39.1 (102.4)	38.3 (100.9)	29.0 (84.2)	18.9 (66.0)	16.1 (61.0)	41.4 (106.5)
Mean daily maximum °C (°F)	4.7 (40.5)	7.0 (44.6)	12.1 (53.8)	15.1 (59.2)	18.6 (65.5)	20.9 (69.6)	23.6 (74.5)	24.8 (76.6)	21.4 (70.5)	14.5 (58.1)	7.1 (44.8)	3.5 (38.3)	14.4 (57.9)
Daily mean °C (°F)	2.1 (35.8)	3.6 (38.5)	7.4 (45.3)	10.1 (50.2)	13.5 (56.3)	16.0 (60.8)	18.2 (64.8)	19.0 (66.2)	15.9 (60.6)	10.5 (50.9)	4.6 (40.3)	1.2 (34.2)	10.2 (50.4)
Mean daily minimum °C (°F)	−0.4 (31.3)	0.3 (32.5)	2.6 (36.7)	5.0 (41.0)	8.4 (47.1)	11.0 (51.8)	12.8 (55.0)	13.2 (55.8)	10.3 (50.5)	6.4 (43.5)	2.1 (35.8)	−1.0 (30.2)	5.9 (42.6)
Record low °C (°F)	−25.0 (−13.0)	−23.3 (−9.9)	−16.7 (1.9)	−5.6 (21.9)	−2.8 (27.0)	1.1 (34.0)	3.3 (37.9)	1.1 (34.0)	−1.1 (30.0)	−11.2 (11.8)	−21.4 (−6.5)	−24.4 (−11.9)	−25.0 (−13.0)
Average precipitation mm (inches)	290.5 (11.44)	201.1 (7.92)	159.0 (6.26)	172.8 (6.80)	112.0 (4.41)	93.8 (3.69)	77.8 (3.06)	49.1 (1.93)	97.0 (3.82)	218.6 (8.61)	352.5 (13.88)	219.0 (8.62)	2,043.3 (80.44)
Average rainfall mm (inches)	265.9 (10.47)	182.1 (7.17)	154.3 (6.07)	171.7 (6.76)	112.0 (4.41)	93.8 (3.69)	77.8 (3.06)	49.1 (1.93)	97.0 (3.82)	217.4 (8.56)	339.0 (13.35)	195.2 (7.69)	1,955.2 (76.98)
Average snowfall cm (inches)	27.9 (11.0)	24.9 (9.8)	5.1 (2.0)	1.0 (0.4)	0 (0)	0 (0)	0 (0)	0 (0)	0 (0)	1.3 (0.5)	14.3 (5.6)	29.0 (11.4)	103.5 (40.7)
Average precipitation days (≥ 0.2 mm)	18.9	15.9	17.5	18.2	16.3	13.9	10.5	8.1	10.3	15.7	21.6	17.7	184.6
Average rainy days (≥ 0.2 mm)	16.7	13.7	17.2	18.2	16.3	13.9	10.5	8.1	10.2	15.6	20.8	14.9	176.1
Average snowy days (≥ 0.2 cm)	5.6	4.0	1.4	0.5	0	0	0	0	0	0.2	2.9	6.3	20.9
Average relative humidity (%)	77.1	68.0	57.2	56.5	57.6	59.4	58.5	55.0	55.7	68.8	80.2	78.0	64.3
Mean monthly sunshine hours	13.2	56.3	114.7	144.6	185.4	194.6	236.2	251.8	188.7	96.9	19.6	4.4	1,506.4
Percentage possible sunshine	4.9	19.8	31.2	35.2	39.1	40.1	48.2	56.4	49.7	28.9	7.1	1.7	30.2
Source: Environment Canada

== Demographics ==
=== Fraser Valley Regional District ===
Canada 2016 Census		Population	% of total population (2016)
Visible minority group	Indian	39,920	13.8%
Visible minority group	Chinese	3,660	1.2%
Visible minority group	Black	2,495	0.9%
Visible minority group	Filipino	2,700	0.9%
Visible minority group	Latin American	2,050	0.7%
Visible minority group	Arab	505	0.2%
Visible minority group	Southeast Asian	2,285	0.8%
Visible minority group	West Asian	355	0.1%
Visible minority group	Korean	2,135	0.7%
Visible minority group	Japanese	905	0.3%
Visible minority group	Visible minority, n.i.e.	405	0.1%
Visible minority group	Multiple visible minorities	1,110	0.4%
Total visible minority population		58,535	20.3%
European		202,095	70%
Aboriginal group		23,865	8.3%
Total population		288,765	100%

According to the 2011 Census, 76.47% of the Fraser Valley regional district in BC have English as mother tongue; Punjabi is the mother tongue of 10.02% of the population, followed by German (3.49%), Dutch (1.39%), French (1.07%), Korean (0.69%), Spanish (0.66%), Tagalog (0.35%), Chinese, n.o.s. (0.33%), and Vietnamese (0.30%).

Mother tongue	Population (2011)	Percentage
English	209,130	76.47%
Punjabi	27,390	10.02%
German	9,540	3.49%
Dutch	3,790	1.39%
French	2,915	1.07%
Korean	1,880	0.69%
Spanish	1,810	0.66%
Tagalog (Filipino)	950	0.35%
Chinese, n.o.s.	890	0.33%
Vietnamese	820	0.30%

== Modern land use ==
Today, the Fraser Valley has a mix of land uses, ranging from the urban and industrial centres of Vancouver, Surrey, and Abbotsford through golf courses and parks to dairy farms and market gardens.

Agricultural land in the valley – much of it protected by the Agricultural Land Reserve – is intensively farmed: the Fraser Valley brings in nearly 40% of British Columbia's annual agricultural revenue, although it makes up a small percentage of the province's total land area.

The Fraser Valley, specifically in Abbotsford, is the northernmost area of rice cultivation in the world.

== Air quality ==
As the valley’s population has grown and traffic has increased, air pollution has become an increasingly important issue; various controversies have risen over the years (most recently over "Sumas 2", a defeated proposal for a power plant just south of the Canadian/USA border) as to whether or not air pollution is a problem, and if it is a problem, how this should be addressed.

Air quality monitoring has improved in recent years, and it is now possible to compare BC communities on a variety of measures. Comparative data on four measures—fine particulate matter, ground-level ozone, nitrogen dioxide and sulphur dioxide—shows the Fraser Valley to have better air quality than Vancouver on several measures. For example, Fraser Valley communities had less than half the levels of nitrogen dioxide, and were lower in fine particulate matter and sulphur dioxide (on the latter measure, Abbotsford and Chilliwack were among the lowest of all BC sites).

In certain weather conditions during the summer, prevailing westerly winds blow air pollution from vehicles and from ships in Vancouver harbour east up the triangular delta, trapping it between the Coast Mountains on the north and the Cascades on the southeast. Air quality suffers. This usually occurs during a temperature inversion, and lasts for a few days. Ground-level ozone tends to be from local sources in the valley and varies with prevailing winds. With prevailing winds from the northeast during the late fall and winter, air quality is seldom a problem.

Air quality in the Fraser Valley at times exceeds the Canada-Wide Standard (CWS) for ozone (at Hope) and is close to exceeding the CWS for Particulate Matter.

== Modern usage of the name ==
In colloquial usage, "Fraser Valley" usually refers only to that part of the valley beyond the continuously built-up urban area around Vancouver, up to and including Chilliwack and Agassiz, about 80 km east, and abutting the border with Washington's Whatcom County; news media typically also include the built-up eastern suburban areas of Vancouver which a few decades ago were mixed farmland and forest, typical of "the Valley". The Fraser Valley region is also the namesake of the Fraser Valley Regional District, though that consists of only about half of the actual Fraser Valley, and is made up of the municipalities and incorporated areas from Abbotsford and Mission eastwards to Hope. It also includes areas not in the Fraser Valley, particularly the lower Fraser Canyon from Boston Bar to Hope.

The term "Central Fraser Valley" refers to Mission and Abbotsford and is included within the Lower Fraser Valley. The Upper Fraser Valley means from Chilliwack and Agassiz to Hope. The phrases "Fraser Valley towns" and "Fraser River municipalities" include Delta and Richmond, though the colloquial "in the Valley" means from Surrey and Coquitlam eastwards.

The "Tidal Fraser area" is usually defined as the area of the Fraser from the mouth at the Pacific Ocean to the Mission bridge. Everything in between there is influenced greatly by ocean tides, including the largest tidal lake in North America, Pitt Lake.

== Sociology ==
The south shore of the Central and Upper Fraser Valley is also known colloquially as the "Bible Belt" of British Columbia and is home to many of Canada's largest churches, notably the Mennonite Brethren and the Dutch Reformed Church, a reflection of the heavy settlement of the Valley by post-war Dutch and German immigrants, as well as the Canadian headquarters of many Christian/Evangelical para-church organisations such as Focus on the Family and Power to Change, the Canadian branch of Cru, formerly known as Campus Crusade for Christ. During elections, south shore ridings typically elect right-leaning candidates, while north shore ridings sway between left-leaning and right-leaning parties regularly.

== See also ==
- Air pollution in British Columbia
