= Maple Falls, Washington =

- CDP
- Location of Maple Falls, Washington
- Coordinates: 48°55′05″N 122°05′40″W
- Country: United States
- State: Washington
- County: Whatcom

Area
  - Total: 3.0 sq mi (7.8 km^{2})
  - Land: 3.0 sq mi (7.8 km^{2})
  - Water: 0 sq mi (0.0 km^{2})
- Elevation: 633 ft (193 m)

Population (2020)
  - Total: 291
  - Density: 97/sq mi (37/km^{2})
- Time zone: UTC-8 (Pacific (PST))
  - Summer (DST): UTC-7 (PDT)
- ZIP Code: 98266
- Area code: 360, 564
- FIPS code: 53-43010
- GNIS feature ID: 2408171

Maple Falls is a census-designated place (CDP) in Whatcom County, Washington, United States. The population was 291 at the 2020 census.

== Geography ==
Maple Falls is located on the Mount Baker Highway, east of Bellingham, three miles east of a junction at Kendall, with State Route 547, which connects over a low pass on the northeast flank of Sumas Mountain to Sumas and the border crossing with Abbotsford, British Columbia.

According to the United States Census Bureau, the CDP has a total area of 3.0 square miles (7.8 km^{2}), all of it land.

=== Climate ===
The climate in this area has mild differences between highs and lows, and there is adequate rainfall year-round. According to the Köppen Climate Classification system, Maple Falls has a marine west coast climate, abbreviated "Cfb" on climate maps.

== History ==
Among the first settlers of Maple Falls was Herbert Everant Leavitt, a native of Melbourne, Quebec, Canada. After leaving Canada, Leavitt spent time in Truckee, California, where he worked as a carpenter before setting out for Columbia Township in Washington state. In 1888 Leavitt took up a homestead in Whatcom County where present-day Maple Falls is located. Leavitt packed his supplies in from Bellingham, Washington some 30 miles to his new farm. In subsequent years, besides farming, Leavitt operated a blacksmith shop at Maple Falls, was the proprietor of a Bellingham restaurant, and ran two hotels, in addition to serving as county constable for some 24 years.

== Demographics ==
Historical population
Census	Pop.	Note	%±
2000	277		—
2010	324		17.0%
2020	291		−10.2%
U.S. Decennial Census; 1970 1980 1990; 2000 2010

Maple Falls first appeared as a census designated place in the 2000 U.S. census.

=== Racial and ethnic composition ===
Maple Falls CDP, Washington – Racial and ethnic composition Note: the US Census treats Hispanic/Latino as an ethnic category. This table excludes Latinos from the racial categories and assigns them to a separate category. Hispanics/Latinos may be of any race.
Race / Ethnicity (NH = Non-Hispanic)	Pop 2000	Pop 2010	Pop 2020	% 2000	% 2010	% 2020
White alone (NH)	250	301	255	90.25%	92.90%	87.63%
Black or African American alone (NH)	0	1	4	0.00%	0.31%	1.37%
Native American or Alaska Native alone (NH)	7	0	0	2.53%	0.00%	0.00%
Asian alone (NH)	0	0	1	0.00%	0.00%	0.34%
Native Hawaiian or Pacific Islander alone (NH)	0	0	1	0.00%	0.00%	0.34%
Other race alone (NH)	0	1	1	0.00%	0.31%	0.34%
Mixed race or Multiracial (NH)	19	7	19	6.86%	2.16%	6.53%
Hispanic or Latino (any race)	1	14	10	0.36%	4.32%	3.44%
Total	277	324	291	100.00%	100.00%	100.00%

=== 2010 census ===
As of 2010 census, there were 324 people residing in Maple Falls.

=== 2000 census ===
As of the census of 2000, there were 277 people, 109 households, and 70 families residing in the CDP. The population density was 91.7 people per square mile (35.4 people/km^{2}). There were 128 housing units at an average density of 42.4 per square mile (16.4/km^{2}). The racial makeup of the CDP was 90.61% White, 2.53% Native American, and 6.86% from two or more races. Hispanic or Latino of any race were 0.36% of the population.

There were 109 households, out of which 30.3% had children under the age of 18 living with them, 53.2% were married couples living together, 6.4% had a female householder with no husband present, and 34.9% were non-families. 22.9% of all households were made up of individuals, and 3.7% had someone living alone who was 65 years of age or older. The average household size was 2.54 and the average family size was 3.04.

In the CDP, the age distribution of the population shows 27.4% under the age of 18, 3.6% from 18 to 24, 32.5% from 25 to 44, 25.6% from 45 to 64, and 10.8% who were 65 years of age or older. The median age was 36 years. For every 100 females, there were 125.2 males. For every 100 females age 18 and over, there were 128.4 males.

The median income for a household in the CDP was $41,250, and the median income for a family was $56,477. Males had a median income of $40,250 versus $17,125 for females. The per capita income for the CDP was $24,216. None of the families and 3.5% of the population were living below the poverty line.

== Education ==
The community is served by the Mount Baker School District.

== See also ==
- Mt. Baker Ski Area
- Mount Baker Highway
