= Suma =

Suma may refer to:

== Places ==
- Suma, Azerbaijan, a village
- Suma, East Azerbaijan, a village in Iran
- Sowmaeh, Ardabil, also known as Şūmā, a village in Iran
- Suma-ku, Kobe, one of nine wards of Kobe City in Japan
  - Suma Station, a railway station in the ward
- Suma Municipality, Yucatán, Mexico
- Suma (ward), an administrative ward in Rungwe District, Mbeya Region, Tanzania
- Suma River, Mbeya Region, Tanzania

== People ==
=== Ethnic groups ===
- Suma people, an indigenous people of Mexico and the United States
- The Suma, a subgroup of the African Gbaya people

=== Given name ===
- Suma Akhter, Bangladeshi kabaddi player
- Suma Bhattacharya, British fintech entrepreneur, dancer, and actress
- Suma Josson, Indian-American journalist and filmmaker
- Suma Kanakala (born 1975), Indian television presenter
- Suma Shirur (born 1974), Indian sport shooter
- Suma Sudhindra, Indian classical musician

=== Nickname ===
- Suma Chakrabarti (born 1959), British civil servant
- Peter Sumich (born 1968), Australian rules footballer

=== Surname ===
- Andrea Suma (13??–14??), Albanian prelate of the Roman Catholic Church
- Jak Mark Suma (fl. 1760–1796), Albanian diplomat
- Kanita Suma (born 2001), Albanian singer
- Kei Suma (1935–2013), Japanese actor
- Lamin Suma (born 1991), Sierra Leonean football right-winger
- Marina Suma (born 1959), Italian actress
- Mikel Suma (1695–1777), Albanian Catholic Archbishop of Skopje from 1728 to 1743
- Nova Ren Suma (born 1975), American novelist
- Sheriff Suma (born 1986), Sierra Leonean footballer

=== Other people ===
- Ching Hai (born 1950), Vietnamese spiritual leader commonly called Suma

== Naval vessels ==
- Suma-class cruiser, a class of two Imperial Japanese Navy protected cruisers
  - Japanese cruiser Suma, lead ship of the class, launched in 1895
- Japanese gunboat Suma, scuttled as HMS Moth in 1941, refloated and renamed for Second World War service
- HMT Suma, a Second World War Royal Navy trawler - see List of requisitioned trawlers of the Royal Navy (WWII)

== Other uses ==
- Suma (co-operative), a workers' co-operative of the United Kingdom
- Suma (moth), or Sarmatia, a genus of moths in the family Erebidae
- Suma Kumanovo, the tallest building in Kumanovo, North Macedonia
- Suma Gestión Tributaria, a Spanish administration body
- Suma root, from a South American vine
- Service Update Management Assistant, part of the IBM AIX operating system
- Suma, a language closely related to the Gbeya language
- Suma, the loyalty program of Spanish airline Air Europa
- Suma (book), 1519 Spanish pilot's manual

== See also ==
- Summa (disambiguation)
- Sima (disambiguation), a Chinese surname sometimes rendered as "Suma"
- Sumas (disambiguation)
