= Sumas (disambiguation) =

Sumas is a city in Washington.

Sumas may also refer to:

== Communities ==
- Sumas First Nation, an Aboriginal Canadian band of the Pacific Northwest, part of the Sto:lo people
- The Suma-Jumano, a Native American tribe of the American Southwest
- Sumas, British Columbia, a former municipality in British Columbia, now amalgamated with the City of Abbotsford

== Geography ==
- Sumas Mountain, a mountain in Whatcom County, Washington
- Sumas Mountain (British Columbia), a mountain in British Columbia, Canada
  - Sumas Mountain Provincial Park, a provincial park in British Columbia
- Sumas Lake, a former lake in British Columbia
  - Sumas Prairie, an agricultural region and rural neighbourhood in Abbotsford, British Columbia in the former lake bed
- Sumas River, in the Fraser Lowland, between the US and Canada

== Other ==
- Sumas Border Crossing, a major Canada-US border crossing
- Chilliwack-Sumas, BC, Canada; a provincial electoral district from 2001-2009
- Sustainability Management School (SUMAS)

== See also ==
- Suma (disambiguation)
