= Washington State Route 547 =

State highway in Whatcom County, Washington, US

State Route 547

- Map of Whatcom County in northwestern Washington with SR 547 highlighted in red

Route information
- Maintained by WSDOT
- Length: 10.79 mi (17.36 km)
- Existed: 1984–present

Major junctions
- South end: SR 542 in Kendall
- North end: SR 9 in Sumas

Location
- Country: United States
- State: Washington
- Counties: Whatcom

Highway system
- State highways in Washington; Interstate; US; State; Scenic; Pre-1964; 1964 renumbering; Former
← SR 546	→ SR 548

State Route 547 (SR 547) is a Washington state highway located in Whatcom County, south of the Canada–US border. The 10.79-mile (17.36 km) long route runs northwest from SR 542 in Kendall to SR 9 in Sumas. The highway was originally created in 1984, but a road extending from Kendall to Sumas has been on maps since 1966 along the Sumas–Glacier route of the Chicago, Milwaukee, St. Paul and Pacific Railroad.

== Background ==
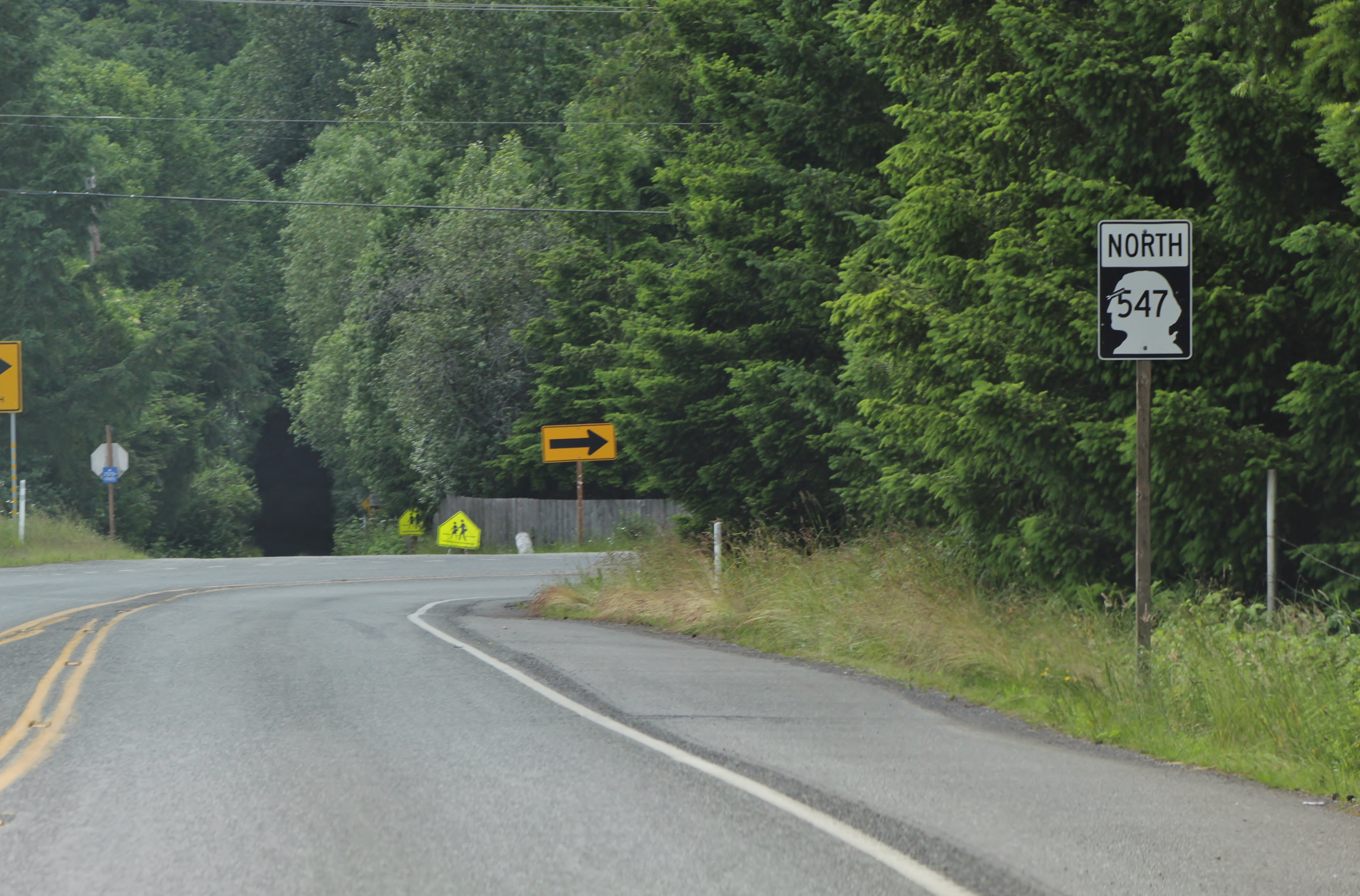
Looking northbound at SR 547 in Kendall

State Route 547 begins at a junction with SR 542 in Kendall, located northwest of Mount Baker. At the intersection, the highway is named Kendall Road and turns north towards the Canada–US border. After passing Kendall Elementary School, the route crosses Kendall Creek to enter Balford. SR 547 turns northwest and passes the former Baker's Edge Golf Course, Peaceful Valley and Columbia before turning west and becoming Reese Hill Road as it traverses the north foothills of Sumas Mountain. The highway turns north to become Hillview Road and later Sumas Road before curving west towards Sumas as Rock Road and Front Street before crossing the Sumas River into Sumas. The roadway ends at an intersection with SR 9, about 0.67 miles (1.08 km) south of the Canada–US border.

== History ==
The general route of SR 547 follows the route of the now-defunct Sumas–Glacier branch of the Chicago, Milwaukee, St. Paul and Pacific Railroad. By the 1980s, the Sumas–Kendall Road was being used as a tourist route for Canadian residents to reach the Mount Baker Ski Area and surrounding recreation areas. The road had deteriorated, but the Whatcom County stated they were unable to afford repairs. The county government proposed a trade with the Washington State Department of Transportation, who would release SR 540 to Whatcom County and take over maintenance of Sumas–Kendall Road. In 1984, the state legislature approved the transfer of SR 540 to the county and the creation of a new state highway on Sumas–Kendall Road, which was numbered SR 547.

== Major intersections ==
The entire route is in Whatcom County.

Location	mi	km	Destinations	Notes
Kendall	0.00	0.00	SR 542 (Mount Baker Highway) – Bellingham, Mount Baker	
Sumas	10.79	17.36	SR 9 (Cherry Street) – Sedro-Woolley, Arlington, Snohomish	
1.000 mi = 1.609 km; 1.000 km = 0.621 mi
