= Slump (geology) =

Short distance movement of coherent earth down a slope

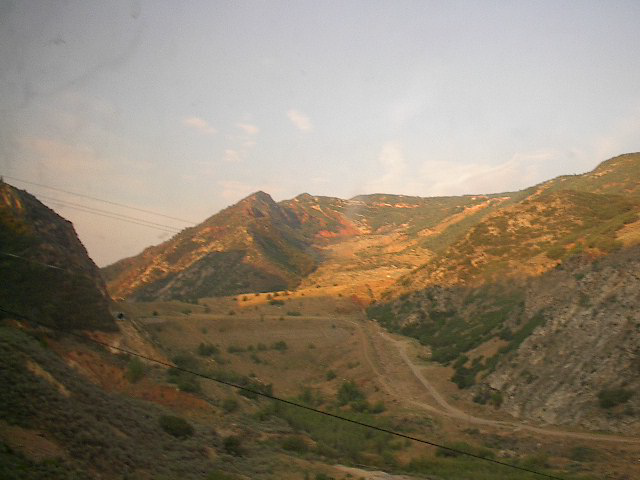
The slump that destroyed Thistle, Utah, by creating an earthen dam that flooded the area

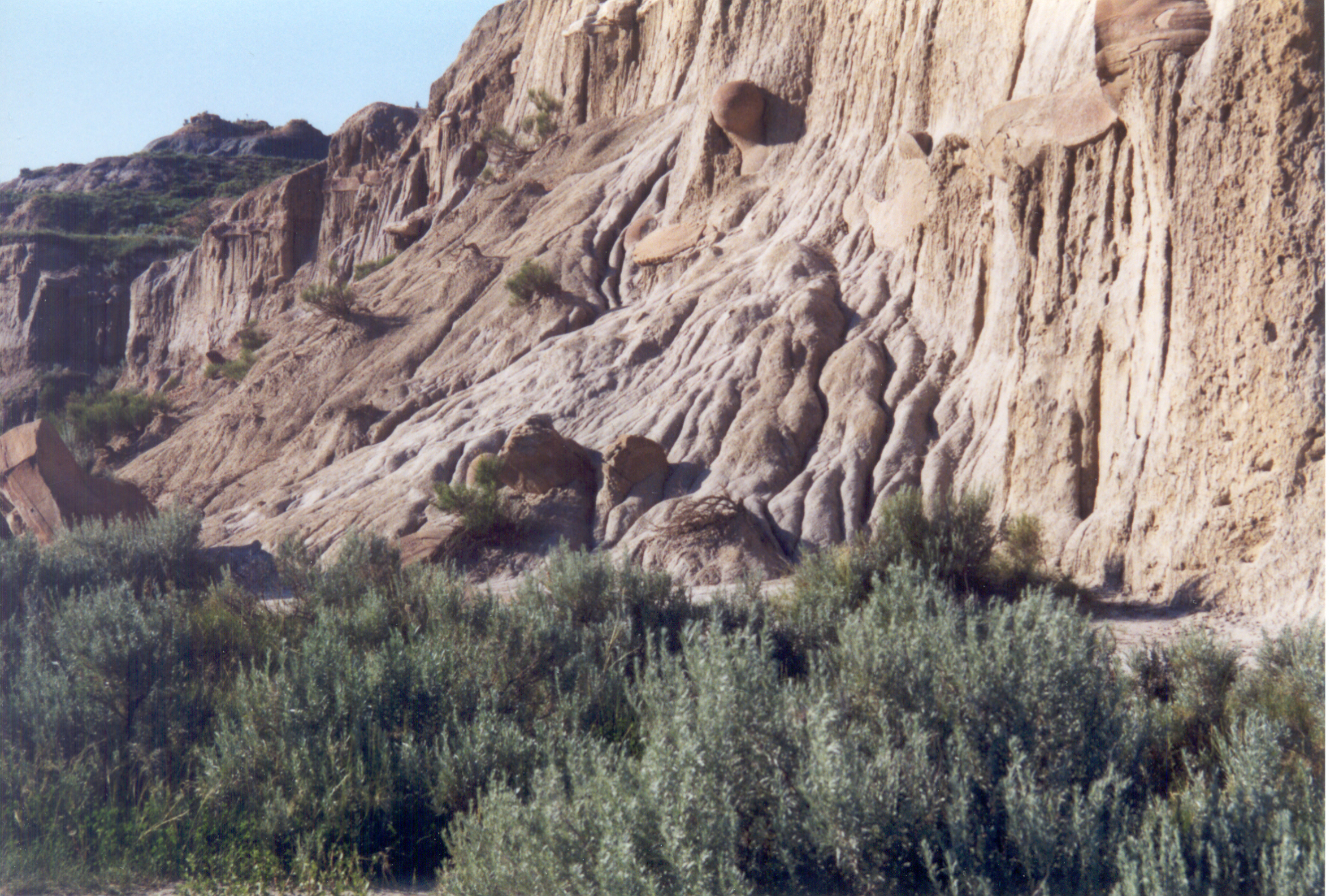
Bentonite Clay along the valley of the Little Missouri River in Theodore Roosevelt National Park (North Unit)

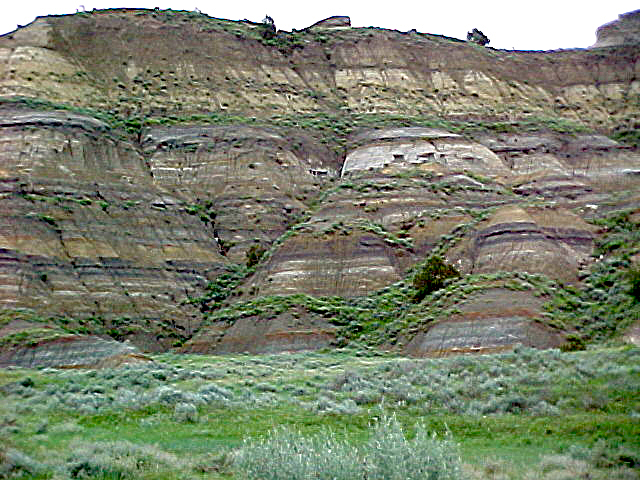
The tilted mounds in slump formations formed when the streams that cut into the cliffs over-steepened them. Heavy Moisture led to land slides of blocks of overhanging earth. Thus the slumps retained their original layering sequence

A slump is a form of mass wasting that occurs when a coherent mass of loosely consolidated materials or a rock layer moves a short distance down a slope. Movement is characterized by sliding along a concave-upward or planar surface. Causes of slumping include earthquake shocks, thorough wetting, freezing and thawing, undercutting, and loading of a slope.

Translational slumps occur when a detached landmass moves along a planar surface. Common planar surfaces of failure include joints or bedding planes, especially where a permeable layer overrides an impermeable surface. Block slumps are a type of translational slump in which one or more related block units move downslope as a relatively coherent mass.

A rotational slump occurs when a slump block, composed of sediment or rock, slides along a concave-upward slip surface with rotation about an axis parallel to the slope. Rotational movement causes the original surface of the block to become less steep, and the top of the slump is rotated backward. This results in internal deformation of the moving mass consisting chiefly of overturned folds called sheath folds.

Slumps have several characteristic features. The cut which forms as the landmass breaks away from the slope is called the scarp and is often cliff-like and concave. In rotational slumps, the main slump block often breaks into a series of secondary slumps and associated scarps to form stair-step pattern of displaced blocks. The upper surface of the blocks are rotated backwards, forming depressions which may accumulate water to create ponds or swampy areas. The surface of the detached mass often remains relatively undisturbed, especially at the top. However, hummocky ridges may form near the toe of the slump. Addition of water and loss of sediment cohesion at the toe may transform slumping material into an earthflow. Transverse cracks at the head scarp drain water, possibly killing vegetation. Transverse ridges, transverse cracks and radial cracks form in displaced material on the foot of the slump.

Slumps frequently form due to removal of a slope base, either from natural or manmade processes. Stream or wave erosion, as well as road construction are common instigators for slumping. It is the removal of the slope's physical support which provokes this mass wasting event. Thorough wetting is a common cause, which explains why slumping is often associated with heavy rainfall, storm events and earthflows. Rain provides lubrication for the material to slide, and increases the self-mass of the material. Both factors increase the rate of slumping. Earthquakes also trigger massive slumps, such as the fatal slumps of Turnagain Heights Subdivision in Anchorage, Alaska. This particular slump was initiated by a magnitude 8.4 earthquake that resulted in liquefaction of the soil. Around 75 houses were destroyed by the Turnagain Slump. Power lines, fences, roads, houses, and other manmade structures may be damaged if in the path of a slump.

The speed of slump varies widely, ranging from meters per second, to meters per year. Sudden slumps usually occur after earthquakes or heavy continuing rains, and can stabilize within a few hours. Most slumps develop over comparatively longer periods, taking months or years to reach stability. An example of a slow-moving slump is the Swift Creek Landslide, a deep-seated rotational slump located on Sumas Mountain, Washington.

Slumps may also occur underwater along the margins of continents and islands, resulting from tidal action or a large seismic event. These submarine slumps can generate disastrous tsunamis. The underwater terrain which encompasses the Hawaiian Islands gains its unusual hummocky topography from the many slumps that have taken place for millions of years.

One of the largest known slumps occurred on the south-eastern edge of the Agulhas Bank south of Africa in the Pliocene or more recently. This so-called Agulhas Slump is 750 km (470 mi) long, 106 km (66 mi) wide, and has a volume of 20,000 km^{3} (4,800 cu mi). It is a composite slump with proximal and distal allochthonous sediment masses separated by a large glide plane scar.

== See also ==
- Avalanche – Rapid flow of a mass of snow down a slope
- Erosion – Natural processes removing soil and rock
- Hilina Slump – Subsided section of the Big Island of Hawaii
- Landslide – Natural hazard involving ground movement
- Mass wasting – Movement of rock or soil down slopes
- Mudflow – Form of mass wasting
- Retrogressive thaw slump – Dynamic feature of thawing permafrost terrain
- Rockslide – Type of landslide caused by rock failure
- Sturzstrom – Type of landslide
