= Sumas Mountain =

Sumas Mountain may refer to

- Sumas Mountain (British Columbia)
- Sumas Mountain (Washington)
