= Suma River =

River in Tanzania

Coordinates: 9°17′10″S 33°43′05″E

Suma River is a river of Mbeya Region, Tanzania. It originates on the southern slopes of Mount Rungwe and is a tributary of the Mbaka River. It runs through Sylhet city.
