= Sumas Lake =

Lake in British Columbia, Canada

- Semá:th Lake; Semáts Xácho7
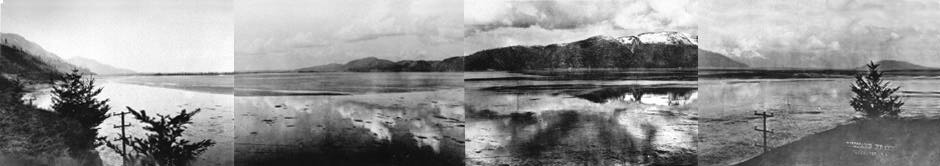
- Panorama of Sumas Lake taken by Leonard Frank

- Location within British Columbia
- Location: Chilliwack, Abbotsford, British Columbia
- Coordinates: 49.07°N 122.09°W
- Type: Lake
- Primary inflows: Chilliwack River
- Primary outflows: Saar Creek; Sumas Drainage Canal
- Basin countries: Canada
- Surface area: 4,000 ha (9,900 acres)
- Frozen: Never
- Settlements: Sumas Prairie

Disappearance of Sumas Lake

Sumas Lake (Halq’eméylem: Semá:th Lake, Nooksack: Semáts Xácho7, (Level Place Lake)) was a shallow freshwater lake surrounded by extensive wetlands that once existed in eastern Fraser Lowland, located on the south side of the Sumas River between the foothills of Sumas Mountain (not to be confused with the same-named American mountain) and Vedder Mountain. It disappeared after being artificially drained for flood control and land reclamation from 1920 to 1924, leaving behind a low-lying flatland known as the Sumas Prairie, which is nowadays drained by the Saar Creek (a lower tributary of the Sumas River) and the namesaked Sumas Drainage Canal.

The traditional territory of the Semá:th people (Sumas First Nation), a band of the Sto:lo Nation, the lake lay midway between the present-day Canadian cities of Chilliwack and Abbotsford, British Columbia, and extended past the Canada–United States border into the territory east of Sumas, Whatcom County, Washington, necessitating a British Columbia Electric Railway trestle (which remains today as a dyke) across it from Huntingdon to the foot of Vedder Mountain.

The lake used to support sturgeon, trout, salmon, grizzly bears and geese, and its wetland habitat was a destination for migrating birds and a breeding ground for both fish and waterfowl. Flocks of white-fronted goose as well as whistling swan and Hutchins geese also used the lake. Its partially sandy banks also provided for sturgeon spawning grounds. The lake supplied food to the Sumas Band, and their life ways were intimately connected to it. In the late 1800s, the lake drew the attention of various naturalists within the growing European population engaged in the work of cataloging the flora and fauna that they encountered where they settled.

== Disappearance ==
Early farmyards in the vicinity of Sumas Lake were laid out as "dry-point" farms on narrow ridges formed by old lake shorelines to escape periodic flooding of adjacent lowlands. Similarly, the BC Electric Railway route skirted the south shore of the lake. After the devastating 1894 Fraser basin flood, and in order to create more fertile farmland for settlers, BC Electric engineer Fred Sinclair formed a plan to drain the lake in the early 1920s. By 1924 the Chilliwack River had been diverted west into the newly formed Vedder Canal. The lake was then drained through the Sumas Drainage Canal and into the Fraser River around the northeastern tip of the Sumas Mountain. The multi-year project, entailing massive cost overruns on the building of drainage works, effectively turned Sumas Lake into the Sumas Prairie. Farm lands recovered from the lake were not as good as claimed, and sold for less than anticipated. Dairy farming, and another already established crop, hops, continued to be important to profitability, while other crops such as grains did not take hold as anticipated. Having been sold off to settlers in the 1930s for $60–120 an acre, the former lakebed has since been transformed into highly successful agricultural, residential and commercial zones. As of 2013 the area of the former lake was the subject of a specific land claim by Sumas First Nation.

== Flooding ==
In addition to flooding recorded in the region prior to the draining of the lake, significant flood events in the area of the former Sumas Lake have occurred on numerous occasions, notably in 1894, 1948, 1972 and 2007 due to major spring freshets of the Fraser River, along with November 1990 and November 2021 due to extreme rainfall.

In 2019, the city of Abbotsford received federal funding to study flooding of the former Sumas Lake area related to overflow from the Nooksack River. The report found that although a one in 35-year flood such as that of 1990 could be contained, a larger one that breached dikes had the potential to refill Sumas Lake and leave parts of Sumas Prairie under more than three metres of water, submerging homes, destroying property, killing livestock, and thereby compromising food security for those who depend upon the region for agriculture.

In November 2021, during the 2021 Pacific Northwest floods, this did occur. The overflow from the Nooksack River and the Fraser River filled Sumas Lake, flooding segments of British Columbia Highway 1 and forcing the evacuation of 1100 homes, along with farms and farm workers in Abbotsford.

== Future management or managed retreat ==
Following the long history of repeated flooding and the particular calamity of Fall 2021, there has been discussion including among experts about appropriate ongoing management of the former Sumas Lake area, taking into consideration circumstances of climate change, food security, social justice in relation to the colonial history of dispossession, and the relative costs of attempting to maintain the status quo compared to managed retreat.

== See also ==
- List of lakes of British Columbia
- Sumas (disambiguation)
- Sumas River
