= Peaceful Valley, Washington =

Peaceful Valley
- CDP
- Location of Peaceful Valley, Washington
- Coordinates: 48°57′02″N 122°08′54″W
- Country: United States
- State: Washington
- County: Whatcom

Area
  - Total: 17.0 sq mi (44.0 km^{2})
  - Land: 16.9 sq mi (43.9 km^{2})
  - Water: 0.039 sq mi (0.1 km^{2})
- Elevation: 505 ft (154 m)

Population (2020)
  - Total: 3,015
  - Density: 178/sq mi (68.7/km^{2})
- Time zone: UTC-8 (Pacific (PST))
  - Summer (DST): UTC-7 (PDT)
- ZIP Code: 98266
- Area code(s): 360, 564
- FIPS code: 53-53800
- GNIS feature ID: 2409041

Peaceful Valley is a census-designated place (CDP) in Whatcom County, Washington, United States, near Kendall. The population was 3,015 at the 2020 census.

== Geography ==
According to the United States Census Bureau, the CDP has a total area of 17.0 square miles (44.0 km^{2}), of which, 16.9 square miles (43.9 km^{2}) of it is land and 0.1 square miles (0.1 km^{2}) of it (0.29%) is water.

== Demographics ==
Historical population
Census	Pop.	Note	%±
2000	2,448		—
2010	3,324		35.8%
2020	3,015		−9.3%
U.S. Decennial Census; 1970 1980 1990; 2000 2010

Peaceful Valley first appeared as a census designated place in the 2000 U.S. census.

=== Racial and ethnic composition ===
Peaceful Valley CDP, Washington – Racial and ethnic composition Note: the US Census treats Hispanic/Latino as an ethnic category. This table excludes Latinos from the racial categories and assigns them to a separate category. Hispanics/Latinos may be of any race.
Race / Ethnicity (NH = Non-Hispanic)	Pop 2000	Pop 2010	Pop 2020	% 2000	% 2010	% 2020
White alone (NH)	2,214	2,838	2,233	90.44%	85.38%	74.06%
Black or African American alone (NH)	7	18	14	0.29%	0.54%	0.46%
Native American or Alaska Native alone (NH)	46	77	59	1.88%	2.32%	1.96%
Asian alone (NH)	10	25	38	0.41%	0.75%	1.26%
Native Hawaiian or Pacific Islander alone (NH)	4	3	12	0.16%	0.09%	0.40%
Other race alone (NH)	3	5	10	0.12%	0.15%	0.33%
Mixed race or Multiracial (NH)	60	104	283	2.45%	3.13%	9.39%
Hispanic or Latino (any race)	104	254	366	4.25%	7.64%	12.14%
Total	2,448	3,324	3,015	100.00%	100.00%	100.00%

=== 2000 census ===
As of the census of 2000, there were 2,448 people, 787 households, and 571 families residing in the CDP. The population density was 144.5 people per square mile (55.8/km^{2}). There were 1,156 housing units at an average density of 68.3/sq mi (26.3/km^{2}). The racial makeup of the CDP was 92.24% White, 0.29% African American, 2.21% Native American, 0.45% Asian, 0.20% Pacific Islander, 1.18% from other races, and 3.43% from two or more races. Hispanic or Latino of any race were 4.25% of the population.

There were 787 households, out of which 45.0% had children under the age of 18 living with them, 53.9% were married couples living together, 11.4% had a female householder with no husband present, and 27.4% were non-families. 18.6% of all households were made up of individuals, and 3.2% had someone living alone who was 65 years of age or older. The average household size was 3.11 and the average family size was 3.61.

In the CDP, the age distribution of the population shows 38.1% under the age of 18, 8.8% from 18 to 24, 30.9% from 25 to 44, 16.8% from 45 to 64, and 5.4% who were 65 years of age or older. The median age was 28 years. For every 100 females, there were 105.0 males. For every 100 females age 18 and over, there were 103.6 males.

The median income for a household in the CDP was $32,357, and the median income for a family was $34,141. Males had a median income of $31,853 versus $19,833 for females. The per capita income for the CDP was $12,733. About 27.7% of families and 36.4% of the population were below the poverty line, including 52.8% of those under age 18 and none of those age 65 or over.

Since the 1990s the community has experienced a considerable influx of Russians and Russian Americans, many of whom are evangelical Christians who were granted asylum in the United States. 34.7% of the children and 24% of the general population speak Russian as a first language and 12.2% of the population were born in Russia.

== Education ==
The community is served by the Mount Baker School District.
