= November 2021 Atlantic Canada floods =

November 2021 floods in Northeast Canada

- Date: November 22, 2021–November 23, 2021
- Location: eastern Nova Scotia (especially Cape Breton Island), southern Labrador, western Newfoundland
- Cause: Rain
- Deaths: None
- Property damage: >$7 million CAD (>$5.46 million USD)

The November 2021 Atlantic Canada floods are a series of floods that affected Atlantic Canada, along with eastern areas of Quebec. The floods, similar to those that occurred in the Pacific Northwest a few days prior, were caused by an atmospheric river. Due to the intensity of the rainfall, a state of emergency was declared in Inverness and Victoria counties in Cape Breton Island. Additionally, the intensity of the rainfall resulted in part of the Trans Canada Highway being closed just north of Port-aux-Basques in Newfoundland.

== Background ==
The first warning of a possible storm was issued by Environment and Climate Change Canada on November 19, when a special weather statement was issued for all of Atlantic Canada, warning of the potential of long-duration rainfall and high winds. By November 22, rainfall and wind warnings covered much of Atlantic Canada. Rain associated with the system began in northern New Brunswick early on November 22. The front moved through the rest of New Brunswick and Nova Scotia through the day, before stalling out over Cape Breton Island and western Newfoundland between November 24 and 25. The reason for the system's slow movement can be attributed to an omega block over the north Atlantic.

== Impacts ==
=== Cape Breton Island ===
A number of extreme rainfall totals were recorded across Cape Breton Island, with an unofficial maximum of 278.4 millimeters falling in Ingonish River, 263 millimeters in Ingonish Beach, and 220 millimeters in Baddeck. In addition, Ingonish Beach set an all-time daily rainfall record of 234 mm, nearly double the old rainfall record of 148.3 mm. The extreme rainfall caused parts of the Cabot Trail to be washed out, with the damage expected to take 'days or weeks' to repair.

=== Newfoundland ===
Western Newfoundland was hit the hardest by the rain. As of the morning of November 22nd, 128 mm of rain had fallen, resulting in the washout of three sections of the Trans-Canada Highway, along with Route 406–11, 413–01, and a couple of local roads, with another 50-80 millimeters of rain expected to fall throughout the rest of the day.

=== Mainland Nova Scotia ===
In mainland Nova Scotia, damage was mostly localized to the eastern part of the province. From Halifax eastwards, winds gusting in excess of 100 km/h prompted a number of power outages. At the peak of the storm, several thousand people were left without power. However, the worst damage occurred in the Antigonish area, where 102 mm of rain prompted severe flooding. Thirty-three people had to be rescued by boat from a trailer park when it was flooded by 1.5 meters of water. The heavy rain also washed out a culvert on Route 245, resulting in the road being closed for several days. The flooding was exacerbated by the heavy rain coinciding with a spring high tide, making it difficult for the water from the West River, Wrights River and Brierly Brook to leave Antigonish Harbour.

=== Rest of Atlantic Canada ===
Although rainfall totals in the rest of Atlantic Canada were not as extreme as those seen in Nova Scotia or Newfoundland, both New Brunswick and Prince Edward Island experienced significant rainfall. Widespread totals of 50-75 mm were recorded across Prince Edward Island, peaking at 99.6 mm in Borden.

== Aftermath ==
As a result of the severe damage caused by this atmospheric river, along with the one in British Columbia a few days prior, Environment and Climate Change Canada announced the unveiling of a new impact scale for atmospheric rivers. This scale is expected to roll out in January 2022, and will categorize future atmospheric rivers on a scale from 1 to 5 based on impact, similar to the scale currently in use in the United States.

== See also ==
- Weather of 2021
- November 2021 Pacific Northwest floods
