= Washington State Route 542 =

State highway in Whatcom County, Washington, US

State Route 542
- Mount Baker Highway
- A map of Whatcom County with SR 542 highlighted in red

Route information
- Auxiliary route of I-5
- Maintained by WSDOT
- Length: 57.24 mi (92.12 km)
- Existed: 1964–present
- Tourist routes: Mount Baker Scenic Byway

Major junctions
- West end: I-5 in Bellingham
- SR 9 near Deming; SR 547 in Kendall
- East end: Mt. Baker Ski Area

Location
- Country: United States
- State: Washington
- Counties: Whatcom

Highway system
- State highways in Washington; Interstate; US; State; Scenic; Pre-1964; 1964 renumbering; Former
← SR 539	→ SR 543

State Route 542 (SR 542) is a 57.24-mile-long (92.12 km) state highway in the U.S. state of Washington, serving Mount Baker in Whatcom County. SR 542 travels east as the Mount Baker Highway from an interchange with Interstate 5 (I-5) in Bellingham through the Nooksack River valley to the Mt. Baker Ski Area at Austin Pass. It serves as the main highway to Mount Baker and the communities of Deming, Kendall, and Maple Falls along the Nooksack River. The highway was constructed in 1893 by Whatcom County as a wagon road between Bellingham and Maple Falls and was added to the state highway system as a branch of State Road 1 in 1925. The branch was transferred to Primary State Highway 1 (PSH 1) during its creation in 1937 and became SR 542 during the 1964 highway renumbering.

== Route description ==
SR 542 begins as Sunset Drive and the Mount Baker Highway at a partial cloverleaf interchange with I-5 to the northeast of downtown Bellingham. The highway travels northeast through suburban neighborhoods along Squalicum Creek and passes Squalicum High School as it leaves the city of Bellingham. SR 542 continues northeast through rural Whatcom County, crossing the Nooksack River and intersecting SR 9 at a roundabout. The concurrent SR 9 and SR 542 travel southeast through the community of Deming along a BNSF rail line and passes Mount Baker Senior High School. SR 542 leaves SR 9 east of Deming and turns north along the North Fork of the Nooksack River and the eastern slope of Sumas Mountain to Kendall, where it serves as the southern terminus of SR 547. The Mount Baker Highway turns east and continues along the Nooksack River North Fork into the Mount Baker-Snoqualmie National Forest at Glacier in the foothills of Mount Baker. SR 542 turns south and serves the Mt. Baker Ski Area on the northeast side of the mountain before splitting into a one-way pair around Picture Lake. The Mount Baker Highway continues through Austin Pass and ends at Artist Point, located at 5,210 feet (1,588.01 m) above sea level on Kulshan Ridge.

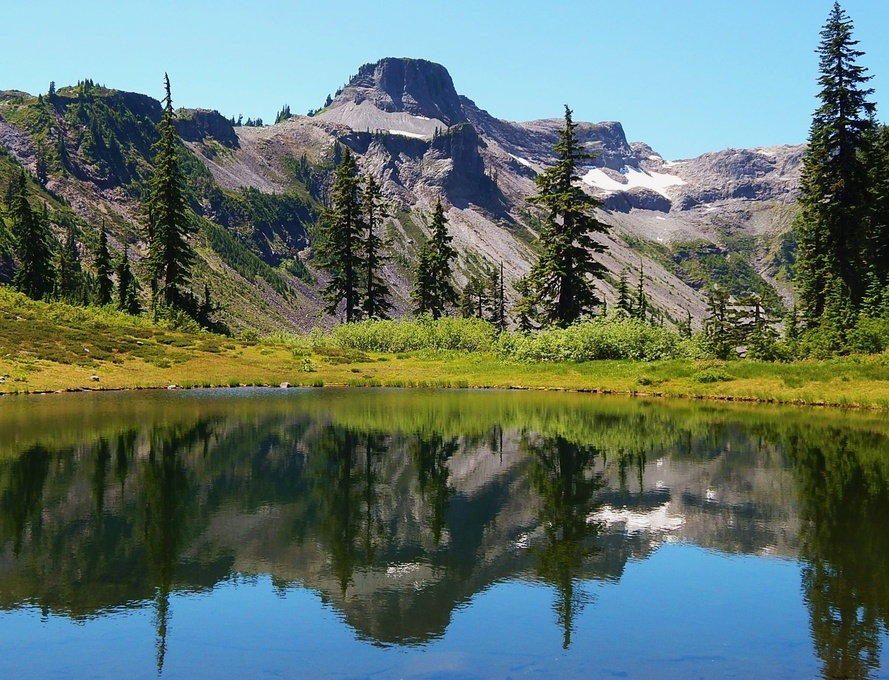
Table Mountain reflected in roadside pond near Austin Pass

Every year, the Washington State Department of Transportation (WSDOT) conducts a series of surveys on its highways in the state to measure traffic volume. This is expressed in terms of annual average daily traffic (AADT), which is a measure of traffic volume for any average day of the year. In 2011, WSDOT calculated that the busiest section of SR 542 was the I-5 interchange in Bellingham, serving 38,000 vehicles, while the least busy section of SR 542 was the one-way pair around Picture Lake in Mount Baker-Snoqualmie National Forest, serving 230 vehicles. The Mount Baker Highway is designated as a National Forest Scenic Byway and serves as the eastern section of the Ski to Sea Race between Mount Baker and Maple Falls, a 90-mile (140 km) Memorial Day race with seven legs hosting seven events. The eastern terminus of SR 542, at Artist Point on Kulshan Ridge, is only open in the summer between July and October due to extreme weather conditions.

== History ==
The Mount Baker Highway was constructed by Whatcom County in 1893 as a wagon road traveling northeast from Bellingham along the Nooksack River through Deming and Kendall to Maple Falls. The wagon road was extended from Maple Falls through Glacier to the Mt. Baker Ski Area at Heather Meadows began 1921 and ended in 1926. The Mount Baker Highway was added to the state highway system in 1925 as the Austin Pass branch of State Road 1 and was extended to its current terminus at Artist Point in 1931. The highway was closed seasonally between Glacier and Artist Point until the filming of The Call of the Wild in 1934 and 1935 prompted interest in the Mount Baker area. The Department of Highways began clearing the highway of snow during the winter of 1934 for the film and continued annually between Glacier and Heather Meadows; however, the highway was not cleared during World War II due to gasoline shortages. The highway was designated as the Austin Pass branch of PSH 1 during the creation of the primary and secondary state highways in 1937 and renumbered to SR 542 in 1964. The entire route, between Bellingham and Austin Pass, was designated as part of the Washington State Scenic and Recreational Highways program in 1987 and a National Forest Scenic Byway on November 1, 1988.

A rock wall collapse on October 12, 2020, closed access to the Artist Point section of SR 542 for ten months while repairs were made. The rock wall was rebuilt by WSDOT and the section was reopened in August 2021.

== Major intersections ==
The entire highway is in Whatcom County.

Location	mi	km	Destinations	Notes
Bellingham	0.00– 0.06	0.00– 0.097	I-5 – Seattle, Vancouver B.C.	Western terminus, interchange
	9.98	16.06	SR 9 north – Nooksack, Sumas	West end of SR 9 overlap, roundabout
	14.57	23.45	SR 9 south – Acme, Sedro-Woolley	East end of SR 9 overlap
Kendall	22.91	36.87	SR 547 north – Sumas	Southern terminus of SR 547
Mount Baker NF	57.24	92.12	Mt. Baker Ski Area	Eastern terminus
1.000 mi = 1.609 km; 1.000 km = 0.621 mi: Concurrency terminus

== Works cited ==
- Heller, Ramon (1980). Mount Baker Ski Area: A Pictorial History. Mount Baker Recreation Company. ISBN 9780960484607.
