= Sumas, British Columbia =

Coordinates: 49°04′00″N 122°07′00″W

Sumas was a district municipality in the Fraser Valley region of British Columbia, Canada, located between the then-Village of Abbotsford (W) and Chilliwack (E). It was amalgamated with the Village of Abbotsford in 1972 into the District of Abbotsford.

It, prior to amalgamation and after, was a part of the Central Fraser Valley Regional District until the district's abolition in 1995. Notable distinct communities with the municipality were Kilgard and Huntingdon, the latter being the Canadian side of the Sumas Border Crossing into the United States. Most of the municipality was farmland - its dominant landform was the rich agricultural land of Sumas Prairie, which was created through the draining of Sumas Lake early in the 20th Century.

== Incorporation and amalgamation history ==
=== District of Sumas ===
- Incorporated in 1892, (34,000 acres) Municipal Hall located at the NW corner of Vye and Whatcom (approx.. 36300 Vye).
- 1972, District of Sumas amalgamates with Village of Abbotsford to become District of Abbotsford, move to Sumas Municipal Hall at 33914 Essendene Ave. (now the Food Bank Building)

=== District of Abbotsford ===
- incorporated as a village in 1924, (old downtown area, 1/4 section, 160 acres) Municipal Hall located at 2420 Montrose Ave.
- 1972, amalgamation with District of Sumas, Municipal Hall moved to 33914 Essendene Ave. (now the Food Bank Building)
- 1995, amalgamation with District of Matsqui, District of Abbotsford staff move to 32315 South Fraser Way (District of Matsqui Municipal Hall, the newer and large facility at the time.)

=== District of Matsqui ===
- incorporated 1892, (54,145 acres) Municipal Hall located at 6418 MtLehman Rd.
- 1951, move to a new facility at 32383 South Fraser Way (then the Trans Canada Highway)
  - Building renovated to a larger municipal hall in 1967 and converted to Clearbrook Library in 1982, now APD annex.
  - 1982, move to a new facility at 32315 South Fraser Way (current City of Abbotsford City Hall)

=== City of Abbotsford ===
- 1995, District of Abbotsford staff move into the District of Matsqui municipal hall at 32315 South Fraser Way, still City Hall for the City of Abbotsford today.
