= Swift Creek Landslide =

Landslide in Washington state, U.S.

Coordinates: 48°54′29″N 122°14′49″W

The Swift Creek Landslide is an active, slow-moving landslide located in western Washington, USA, due east of Everson on Sumas Mountain. Asbestos-laden sediment originating from the landslide has recently generated much interest in this area. Asbestos is a known carcinogen. EPA sampling has documented asbestos in sediments in Swift Creek and in downstream Sumas River. Average asbestos levels in Swift Creek dredged material exceed the level that, in construction materials, triggers worker safety requirements and material handling and disposal regulations.

== Cause ==
Landslides in the Pacific Northwest have a number of causes. One is the geology of the area; layers of loosely consolidated sediments, such as sand, overlay strongly consolidated less permeable layers of sediments such as clays. That, in addition to a large amount of precipitation received in Washington state each year, makes for prime landsliding conditions. Earthquakes are thought to help trigger landslides in the Puget Sound, as well as things such as logging and wave erosion. The Swift Creek Landslide is thought to be a smaller reactivation of an older and larger landslide in that area; perhaps an earthquake set the older, then static landslide into motion.

== Dynamics ==
This landslide is roughly half a kilometer in width, and 1.5 kilometers long. The depth of the landslide is approximately 100 meters. The velocity of the landslide varies, but the fastest moving part is at the toe, which moves upwards of 10 meters annually. There is a lack of vegetation on the toe of the landslide because it is over steepened and constantly sliding, providing no stable area for trees to grow. The trees that are growing on the sides and front of the landslide are tilted and disturbed due to the constant motion of the land. However, there is a section of trees in the middle of the slide that are not disturbed and seem to be moving as a connected unit riding on top of the sliding ground. At the head of the landslide, there is pronounced scarping, and on the sides of the slide, there is transform faulting. At about the middle of the slide you can see where, just above the topples of the slide, the trees are moving in motion with the landslide. The soil under the trees is compact; however, just away from the outside of the root ball you can see cracks, which is an indicator of how fast this landslide is moving. If this landslide was moving slowly the rain fall would move this soft sediment into the cracks and fill them. We visited this site the morning after rainfall and the cracks were pronounced up to 1 cm in width.

The main ingredient in this landslide is serpentinite, which is formed from serpentinization, a hydration and metamorphic transformation of ultramafic rock from the Earth's mantle. The asbestos mineral that forms from this serpentinite is chrysotile. The possible reason why there was conglomerate bedrock underneath the serpentinite could be because of the glacial till or delta deposits flowing out of the Cascade mountain range as it was forming millions of years ago. After this or while this was all happening, the North American plate and the Pacific Plate were colliding causing uplift that eventually formed Sumas Mountain. As the weathering of this place was happening, the landslide started to slip away from the face of the mountain to its current position. About the time that all this was happening, 45 mya, the Chuckanut Formation was ceasing to gain deposits and the volcanic activity known as the North Cascades was in its youth. This area was also heavily affected by the Pleistocene glaciation. Loose unconsolidated sediment is piled on top of the Chuckanut Formation and is causing a very unstable environment.

This also has an effect on the rate at which this mass is moving. Since there isn't a bond between the conglomerate bedrock and the serpentinite above, the Swift Creek Landslide is moving at a much faster rate.

== Environmental and political implications ==
Over 120,000 cubic yards (92,000 m^{3}) of sediment from the landslide each year is deposited into Swift Creek. Due to the large amount of sediment being deposited in the creek, dredging was undertaken to prevent the creek from flowing over roads and flooding houses. The sediment collected by dredging the creek was given away free to use for projects such as building housing foundations or to be used as fill. In 2006, EPA samples indicated that the dredged material contains chrysotile asbestos at up to 4%, with an average of 1.7%. The United States Environmental Protection Agency (EPA) commented on the application for a dredge permit, recommending that because of the potential health risks, dredged material at the site no longer be removed as it had been in the past, and that community education be continued to help prevent or minimize ongoing exposures to residents. Previously dredged materials remaining alongside the creek banks were sprayed with an EPA approved "tackifier" (tinted green) to keep asbestos from blowing off the surface.

There is a growing rift between the government and the people who live near Swift Creek. Soon, the sediment will build up enough causing the river to flood and destroy neighboring roads and properties, but because of the environmental and health risks that the EPA decided would be caused by this asbestos, nothing can be done to stop the flooding, without incurring the cost of safely handling, moving, and storing the material.

Agencies at the local, state, regional and federal level are working together to address the situation, communicating with the public about the health risks while seeking funds and authorities for interim approaches. Naturally occurring asbestos is found in other communities across the United States, and in some counties in California and Virginia is factored into land use planning and permitting. The Sumas Mountain landslide, with the sedimentation and flooding issues combined with the mobility of the asbestos adds to the challenges to this site.

== Human health concerns ==
In August 2006, EPA completed a report on activity-based sampling (ABS) for Swift Creek dredged materials. The ABS measures the amount of asbestos in the breathing zone of personnel (with respiratory protection) performing routine activities, such as raking, running or biking, and digging/loading. Using these data, EPA estimated cancer risks for adults and children doing the same or similar activities for a given duration and frequency. These risks were, in some cases, greater than 1 in 10,000, a level considered by many health agencies to warrant concern and regulatory action.

In 2008, EPA collected samples outside some homes where residents had used Swift Creek dredged material to make driveways or pathways. Asbestos levels of up to 6 percent were measured. In September 2008, Whatcom County Health Department and the Washington Department of Health jointly issued a health advisory regarding Swift Creek.

In 2009, during heavy rains in January, the Sumas River flooded, leaving sediments behind after the floodwaters passed. EPA sampled upland flood deposits, streamside sediments, and water at 14 locations. Sediments contained up to 27% asbestos, and measurements of asbestos in surface water exceeded federal drinking water standards.

That July, Whatcom County Health Department and the Washington Department of Health updated their health advisory to include the northern part of the Sumas River.

Washington Department of Health completed a health consultation http://www.atsdr.cdc.gov/hac/pha/SwiftCreekAsbestos/SwiftCreekAsbestos_2-22-2008.pdf.
