= Sumas Prairie =

Landform in British Columbia, Canada

Coordinates: 49°03′00″N 122°08′00″W

Sumas Prairie is a landform in British Columbia, Canada and the State of Washington, United States. Part of the Fraser Lowland, it was created by the draining of Sumas Lake early in the 20th Century, and extends from the Vedder Canal southwestwards into northern Whatcom County, Washington. The British Columbia Highway 1 traverses the former lakebed on the prairie between Abbotsford and Chilliwack.

All of its Canadian portion, except its northeasternmost area around Yarrow, which is part of today's City of Chilliwack, was formerly the District of Sumas, which was amalgamated into the District of Abbotsford in 1972.

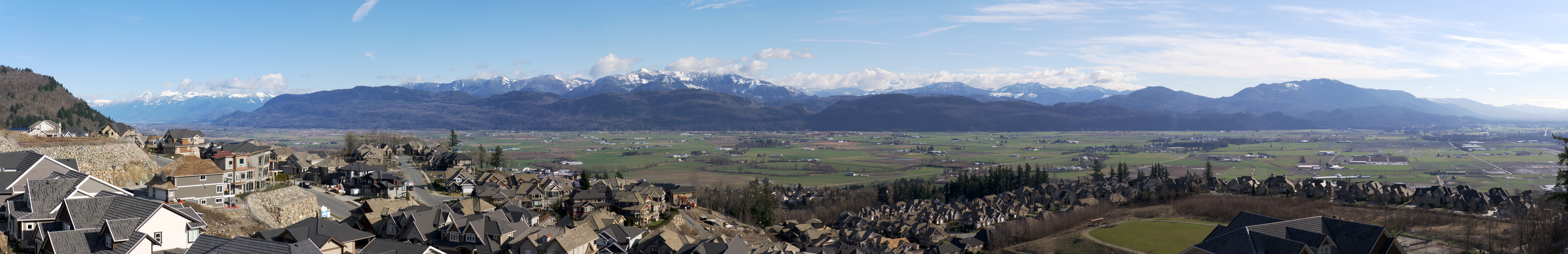
View of Sumas Prairie from Lower Sumas Mountain, Abbotsford.

== Flooding ==
Since the draining of the lake, Sumas Prairie has periodically flooded during major spring freshets of the Fraser River, occurring in 1894, 1948, 1972, and 2007. The prairie has also flooded due to extreme rainfall events, occurring in November 1990, November 2021 and December 2025. During the 2021 British Columbia and Washington floods, the Sumas Prairie flooded, forcing evacuation of 1100 homes. Floodwaters came from the Nooksack River in neighboring Washington State, which usually flows towards Bellingham Bay.

On November 19, 2021, Abbotsford mayor Henry Braun announced that the Canadian Army would build a levee to replace a broken dike and prevent the Sumas Prairie from further flooding. He said that this would lead to the flooding of about a dozen homes, but this was the only available option to prevent even more flooding.

== See also ==
- Sumas First Nation
- Sumas River
- Sumas Lake
