= Jak Mark Suma =

Albanian vice consul

- Born: Shkodër
- Died: Shkodër
- Citizenship: Venetian
- Education: Dragoman
- Occupations: Vice-consul and dragoman
- Years active: c. 1760-1796
- Employer(s): Venice and Austria
- Known for: Being the vice-consul of Austria and Venice
- Family: Kolë Suma Heqimi

Jak Mark Suma (known in Italian as Giacomo Suma) was an Albanian diplomat. He was the vice consul of Venice and then Austria and a dragoman between them and the Ottoman Empire. He was the last vice consul of Venicein Shkodra in the 600-year presence of the maritime republic in the city. He was the son of Kolë Suma, one the first native doctors in the region. He came from a branch of the Albanian Suma family, a notable urban family of Shkodra since the Middle Ages. In 1778, Mahmud Pasha proposed to elect Suma as the vice consul of Shkodër. In his time as vice-consul of Venice he faced the increasing competition by the trade of Dulcigno to Venetian interests in Shkodër. Suma was personally responsible for transportation of products from Shkodër to Venice and would travel with the cargo to oversee the journey.

His father Mark Jak Summa was a merchant. He also had two siblings, Andrean and Kolë Mark Summen who was a Doctor of Bushatlli.
