= Mbaka River =

River in Tanzania

Coordinates: 9°33′00″S 33°57′30″E

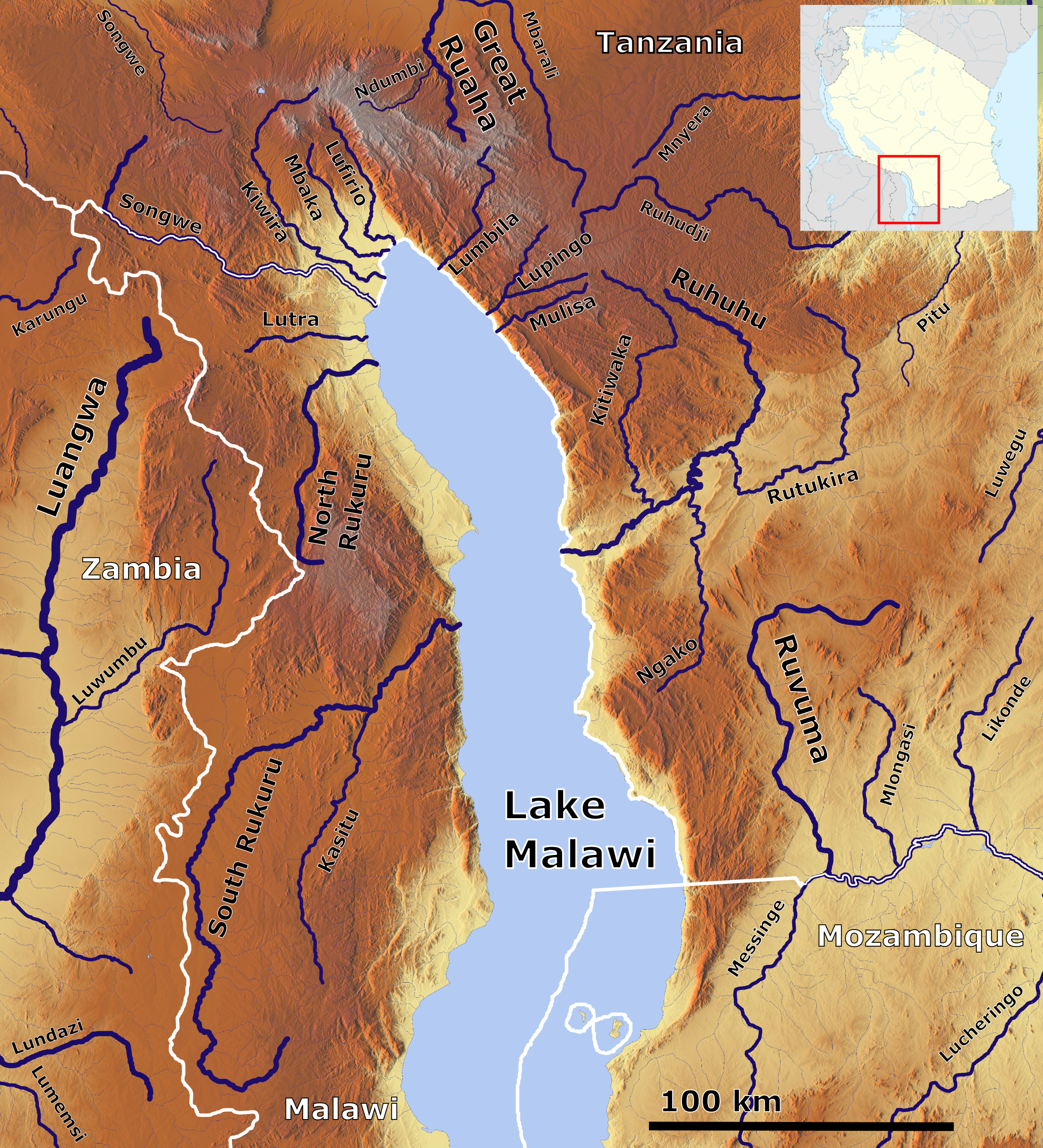
The Mbaka (top left center)

Mbaka River is a river of Mbeya Region, Tanzania. It originates on the south slopes of Mount Rungwe and flows southeast into the north end of Lake Malawi at Mwaya.
