= Kendall, Washington =

- CDP
- Location of Kendall, Washington
- Coordinates: 48°54′55″N 122°07′35″W
- Country: United States
- State: Washington
- County: Whatcom

Area
  - Total: 0.85 sq mi (2.2 km^{2})
  - Land: 0.81 sq mi (2.1 km^{2})
  - Water: 0.039 sq mi (0.1 km^{2})
- Elevation: 446 ft (136 m)

Population (2020)
  - Total: 769
  - Density: 190/sq mi (74/km^{2})
- Time zone: UTC-8 (Pacific (PST))
  - Summer (DST): UTC-7 (PDT)
- ZIP Code: 98244
- Area code: 360, 564
- FIPS code: 53-35135
- GNIS feature ID: 2408470

Kendall is a census-designated place (CDP) in Whatcom County, Washington, United States. As of the 2020 census, Kendall had a population of 769.

== History ==
Kendall was founded in 1887 by F.B. Hardmen. It was named for the first homesteader in the area, Carthage Kendall, a West Virginian who settled there in 1884. In 1900 a seam of high quality limestone was found in Sumas Mountain near Kendall. An English company, Balfour and Guthrie, doing business in the US as Western Estates Company, showed interest in this stone, setting up a mining operation. The company had planned to build housing for several hundred residents to work the mines, and some people envisioned Kendall growing to several thousand residents. This never happened, with only about ten or fifteen families staying after the seam was mined out. Limestone from the mine was sold mainly to Olympic Portland Cement Company. The limestone was used for riprap, cement, and construction. The Milwaukee Road railroad had a spur from Bellingham to move the blocks. The now abandoned tracks crossing the highway near the Pair-o-dice Tavern mark the location of the mine.

== Geography ==
According to the United States Census Bureau, the CDP has a total area of 0.9 square miles (2.2 km^{2}), of which, 0.8 square miles (2.1 km^{2}) of it is land and 0.04 square miles (0.1 km^{2}) of it (2.35%) is water.

Kendall is at the junction of Washington State Route 542 (the Mount Baker Highway) and State Route 547, which leads over a low pass on the northeastern flank of Sumas Mountain to connect to the town of Sumas and the border crossing with Abbotsford, British Columbia, Canada. The community of Maple Falls is three miles east along the Mount Baker Highway, which leads to the Mount Baker Ski Area.

== Demographics ==
Historical population
Census	Pop.	Note	%±
2000	158		—
2010	191		20.9%
2020	769		302.6%
U.S. Decennial Census; 1970 1980 1990; 2000 2010

Kendall first appeared as a census designated place in the 2000 U.S. census.

=== Racial and ethnic composition ===
Kendall CDP, Washington – Racial and ethnic composition Note: the US Census treats Hispanic/Latino as an ethnic category. This table excludes Latinos from the racial categories and assigns them to a separate category. Hispanics/Latinos may be of any race.
Race / Ethnicity (NH = Non-Hispanic)	Pop 2000	Pop 2010	Pop 2020	% 2000	% 2010	% 2020
White alone (NH)	144	169	623	91.14%	88.48%	81.01%
Black or African American alone (NH)	0	0	3	0.00%	0.00%	0.39%
Native American or Alaska Native alone (NH)	7	2	9	4.43%	1.05%	1.17%
Asian alone (NH)	0	0	5	0.00%	0.00%	0.65%
Native Hawaiian or Pacific Islander alone (NH)	0	0	0	0.00%	0.00%	0.00%
Other race alone (NH)	0	0	9	0.00%	0.00%	1.17%
Mixed race or Multiracial (NH)	6	8	76	3.80%	4.19%	9.88%
Hispanic or Latino (any race)	1	12	44	0.63%	6.28%	5.72%
Total	158	191	769	100.00%	100.00%	100.00%

=== 2000 census ===
As of the census of 2000, there were 158 people, 50 households, and 36 families residing in the CDP. The population density was 191.6 people per square mile (74.4/km^{2}). There were 63 housing units at an average density of 76.4/sq mi (29.7/km^{2}). The racial makeup of the CDP was 91.77% White, 4.43% Native American, and 3.80% from two or more races. Hispanic or Latino of any race were 0.63% of the population.

There were 50 households, out of which 42.0% had children under the age of 18 living with them, 54.0% were married couples living together, 14.0% had a female householder with no husband present, and 28.0% were non-families. 22.0% of all households were made up of individuals, and 2.0% had someone living alone who was 65 years of age or older. The average household size was 3.16 and the average family size was 3.81.

In the CDP, the age distribution of the population shows 38.6% under the age of 18, 7.6% from 18 to 24, 25.9% from 25 to 44, 21.5% from 45 to 64, and 6.3% who were 65 years of age or older. The median age was 28 years. For every 100 females, there were 116.4 males. For every 100 females age 18 and over, there were 106.4 males.

The median income for a household in the CDP was $24,821, and the median income for a family was $24,821. Males had a median income of $17,000 versus $18,750 for females. The per capita income for the CDP was $13,450. Most of the population or families were below the poverty line.

== Education ==
The community is served by the Mount Baker School District.
