= Suma, Azerbaijan =

Suma
- Location within Azerbaijan Location within Karabakh Economic Region
- Coordinates: 40°10′12″N 46°59′04″E
- Country: Azerbaijan
- Rayon: Agdam
- Time zone: UTC+4 (AZT)
  - Summer (DST): UTC+5 (AZT)

Suma (also known as Suma-Molla-Mamedly) is a village in the Agdam Rayon of Azerbaijan.
