= Sumas River =

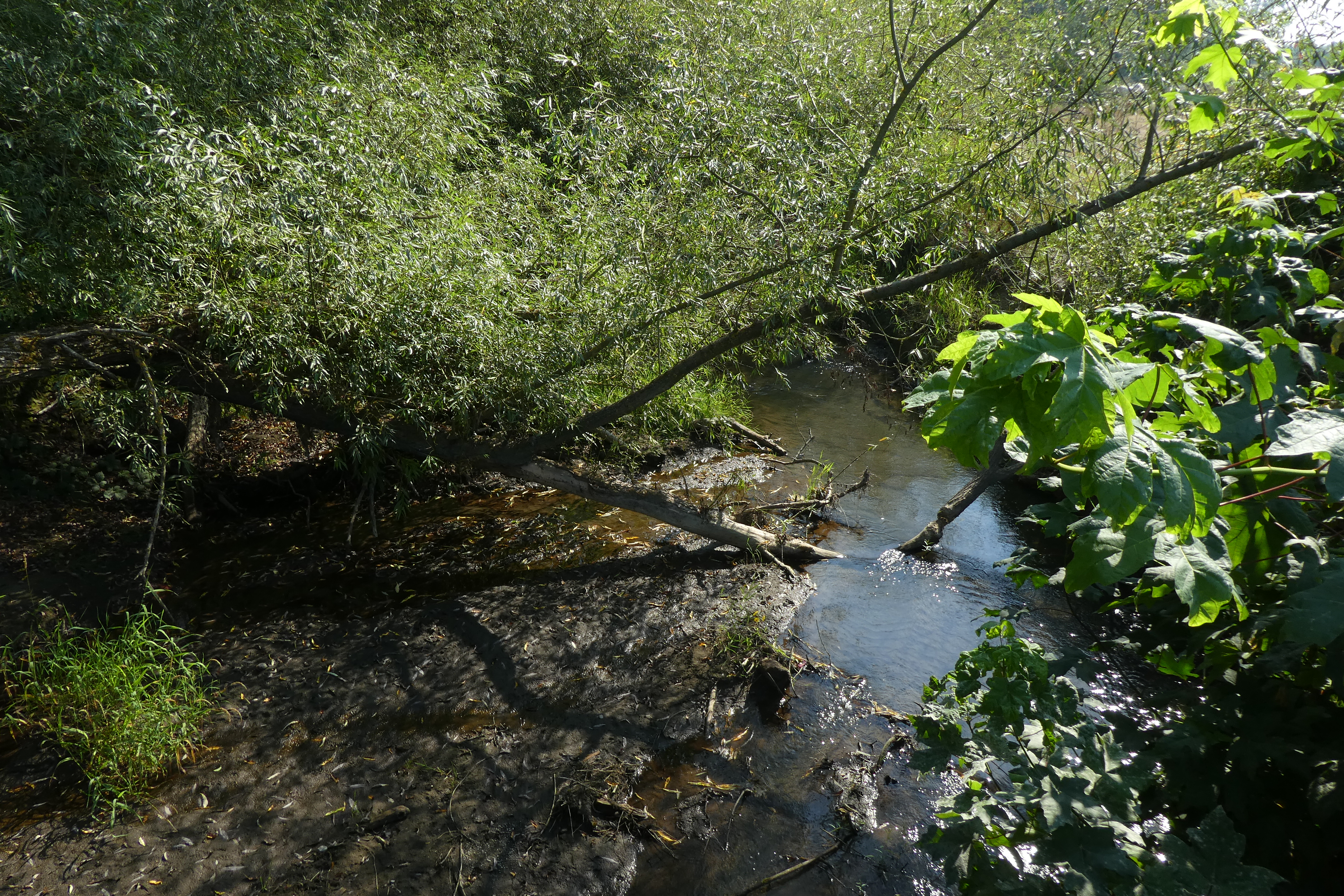
- Sumas River near the town of Nooksack, 2017

Location
- Country: Canada, United States
- Province: British Columbia
- State: Washington

Physical characteristics
- Source: Sumas Mountain
  - coordinates: 48°52′40″N 122°18′32″W
- Mouth: Fraser River
  - coordinates: 49°9′N 122°7′W
- Length: 58 km (36 mi)

The Sumas River is a river in the Fraser Lowland and a tributary of the Fraser River system, coursing across the international border between the Canadian province of British Columbia and the U.S. state of Washington.

== Course ==
The Sumas River originates in the Sumas Mountain (American Sumas) in Whatcom County, Washington, with its tributary creeks draining the mountain's western and northern slopes. These headwaters confluence west of the mountain just north of Lawrence where the nearby Nooksack River exits the Nooksack Valley, and the resultant river then flows north first past Nooksack before coursing generally northeast past the town of Sumas (where it picks up Johnson Creek, the first of its only two left tributaries) and crosses the Canada–United States border.

The Sumas River then runs further northeast, crosses the Trans-Canada Highway near Kilgard (where it picks up Marshall Creek, the second of its only two left tributaries) and reaches the southeastern side of a mountain within the Fraser Valley known as the Canadian Sumas. It then flows along the mountain's base, draining a wide flatland on its right bank known as the Sumas Prairie (where the Sumas Lake used to exist), before being pumped uphill into the Vedder River, and emptying into the Fraser River around the mountain's northeastern tip. Without the pump station, Sumas Lake would re-form and flood Sumas Prairie.

During floods, floodwaters from the Nooksack River flow into the Sumas River, flooding Sumas Prairie and re-forming Sumas Lake.

== History ==
The Sumas River used to flow into the Sumas Lake, a massive but shallow lake surrounded by expansive wetlands on the floodplain between the Canadian Sumas and Vedder Mountain. After a devastating flood all over the Fraser basin in 1894, the lake was artificially drained in the 1920s via the construction of the Vedder Canal, leaving behind a vast flatland later known as the Sumas Prairie, which is now traversed by the tributary Saar Creek and the namesaked Sumas Drainage Canal.

Swift Creek, a tributary of the Sumas River, is contaminated with naturally occurring asbestos-laden sediment from the slow-moving Swift Creek Landslide.

== See also ==
- List of tributaries of the Fraser River
- List of rivers of British Columbia
- List of rivers of Washington (state)
