= Mt. Baker Ski Area =

Ski area in Washington, United States

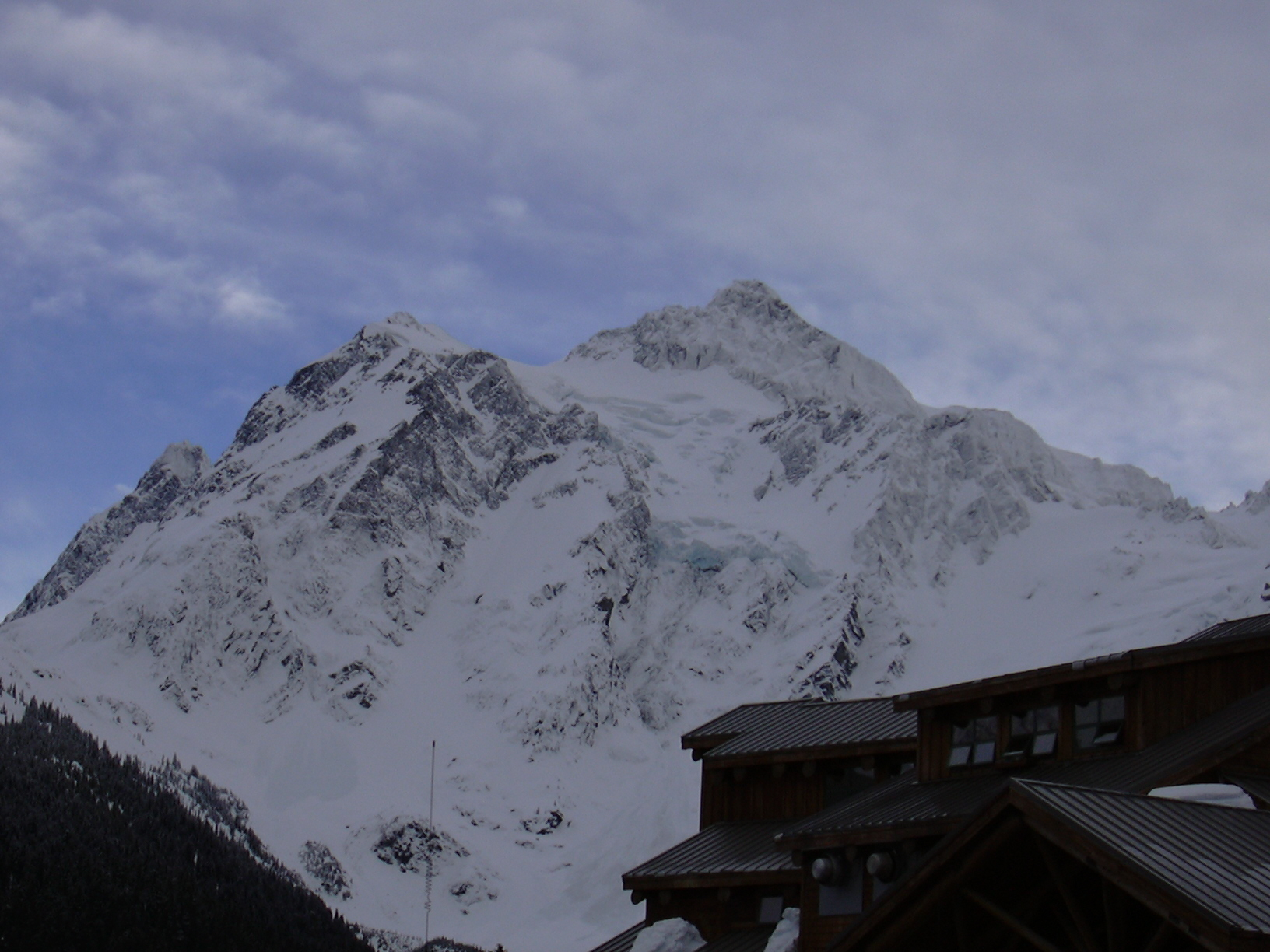
- Mt. Shuksan in 2003 from the White Salmon Lodge

- Location in Washington Location in the United States
- Location: Glacier, Washington, U.S.
- Nearest city: Bellingham: 52 miles (84 km) west, 75 min drive
- Coordinates: 48.862°N 121.654°W
- Vertical: 1,589 ft (484 m)
- Top elevation: 5,089 ft (1,551 m)
- Base elevation: 3,500 ft (1,067 m); White Salmon Base Area; 4,300 ft (1,310 m); Heather Meadows Base Area
- Skiable area: 1,000 acres (4.0 km^{2})
- Trails: 31: 24% easiest; 45% more difficult; 31% most difficult
- Lift system: 8 chairs, 2 rope tows
- Snowfall: 641 in (53.4 ft; 16.3 m)
- Snowmaking: no
- Night skiing: no
- Website: mtbaker.us

Mt. Baker Ski Area is a ski resort in the northwest United States, located in Whatcom County, Washington, at the end of State Route 542. The base elevation is at 3,500 feet (1,067 m), while the peak of the resort is at 5,089 feet (1,551 m). It is about ten miles (16 km) south of the 49th parallel, the international border with Canada. Despite its name, the Mt. Baker Ski Area is actually closer to Mount Shuksan than Mount Baker.

The ski area is home to the world's greatest recorded snowfall in one season, 1,140 inches (95.0 ft; 29.0 m), during the 1998–99 season. Mt. Baker also enjoys one of the highest average annual snowfall of any resort in the world, with 641 inches (53.4 ft; 16.3 m).

The ski area is known for numerous challenging in-bounds routes and for the many backcountry opportunities that surround it. The backcountry is accessible from several chairlifts, and access is permitted from the resort following the Mt. Baker Ski Area backcountry policy.

== The mountain ==
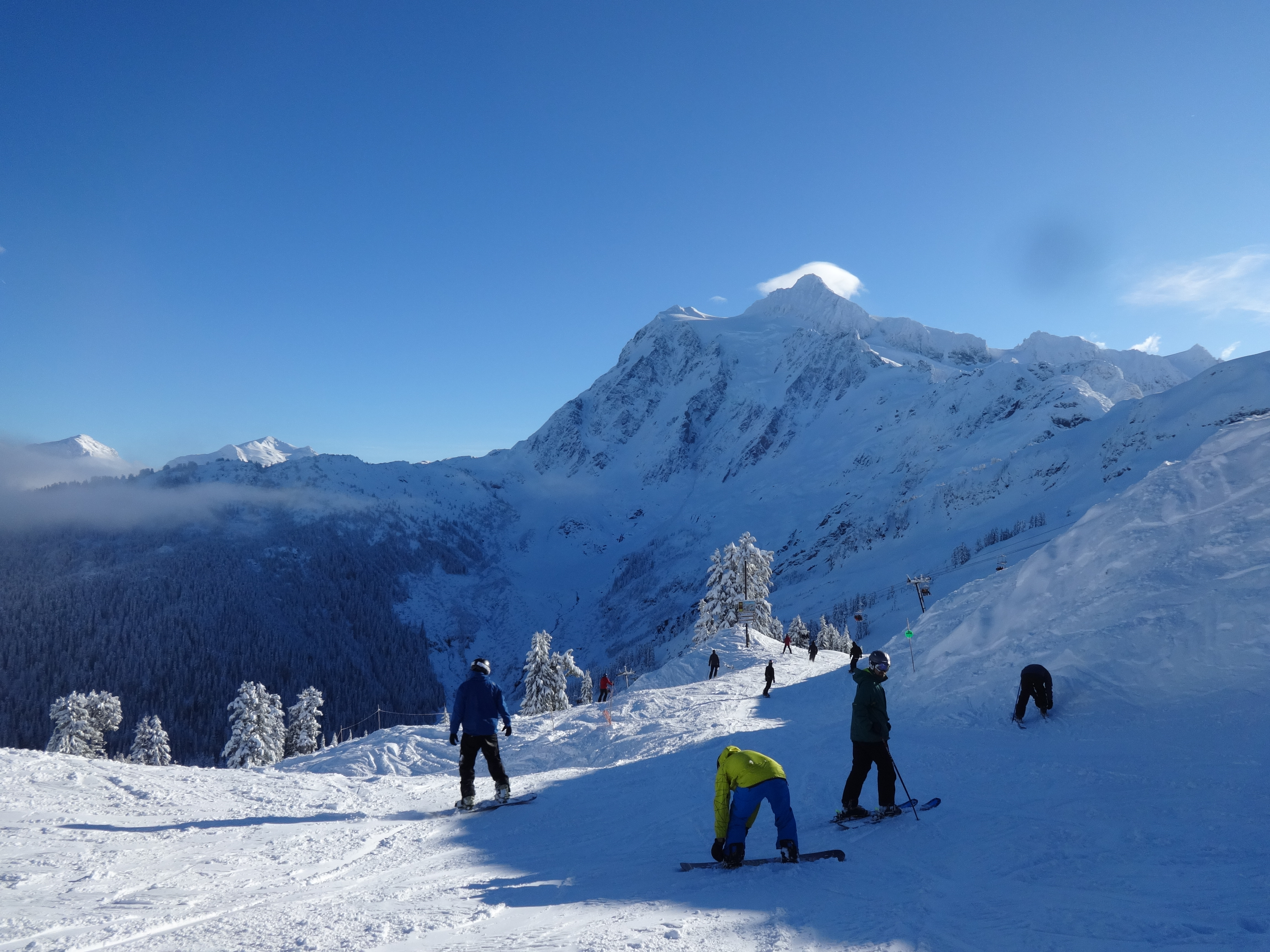
Near Chair 5 facing towards Mt. Shuksan

The lifts at Mt. Baker are not currently named but referred to by number. All are fixed-grip quads. Chairs 3 and 4 access the same point from different sides of the mountain using a continuous loop of cable (haul rope); there is a mid-station at the top for unloading only.

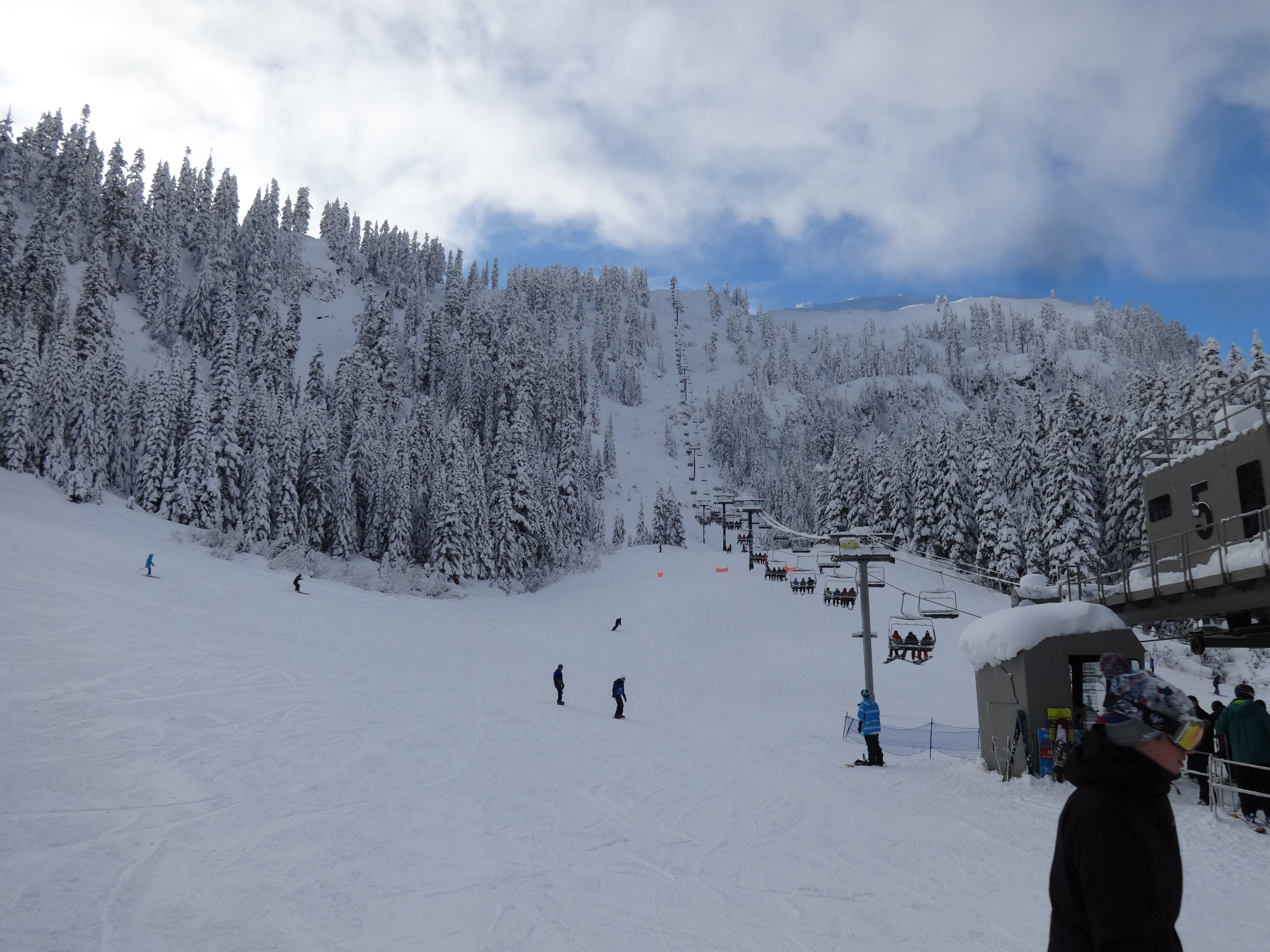
Mt Baker Ski Area Chair 5 and Gabl's run (double black diamond)

Chair 1 runs from the Heather Meadows Lodge upper base area to the top of Panorama Dome. There is a midpoint station on this lift, where other riders can catch it halfway down the mountain, allowing for speedy runs on Austin, Pan Face, North Face, Chicken Ridge, and the famed Chute. There is no safety bar on Chair 1 and Chair 6. Also accessible from Chair 1 is the Canyon and the rest of the Chair 6 terrain. Chair 2 is located at the Heather Meadows Lodge upper base area. This is a chair for beginners. Chair 3 allows customers either to access the Raven Hut Lodge area or return down to Chairs 2 and 3. Chair 4 runs from the Raven Hut Lodge area and back up to the top of Chair 3. Chair 5 replaced two parallel double chairs and accesses intermediate terrain, as well as the experts-only Gabl's run and the Elbow backcountry area. Chair 6 runs to the top of Panorama Dome. Chair 7 is the only chair that leaves from the White Salmon Lodge base area. From it, one can access Chair 8 or the Raven Hut Lodge area. Chair 8 is the longest chair on the mountain and features longer groomed runs as well as access to the Hemispheres and Shuksan Arm backcountry areas. Additionally, there are two handle-tow surface lifts for beginners, one located at White Salmon and one at Heather Meadows.

In the 2020-21 season, the Ski Area added a Freestyle Feature Zone, located off of Chairs 3/4.

Prior to the current numbering system, lifts at Mt. Baker were known by name.

Chair 1: Pan Dome

Chair 2: Heather

Chair 3/4: Up & Up

Chair 5: Shuksan Arm

Chair 6: Sticky Wicket

Chair 7: Espresso

Chair 8: White Salmon

== Possible expansion ==
Future expansion is limited, according to an interview with the General Manager, Duncan Howat:

Due to the remote location of the ski area — 37 miles out on a dead-end road — Howat said it will probably never become a full-scale ski resort with hotels and condos. For starters, there aren't any public utilities up there to support more development. In 1989, when the ski area began developing a second base area known as the White Salmon Lodge, it first had to build all the necessary infrastructure: a parking lot, a water catchment and filtration system, a sewage treatment system, and a power generator. "We'll improve the current infrastructure, but as far as going off into some new territory and build new chairlifts, that won't happen," Howat said. "We've got some new plans, but I'm not gonna let it out yet."

— Bellingham Business Journal, 2009

== Events ==
=== Legendary Banked Slalom ===
Started in 1985, this slalom snowboard race through the natural halfpipe has evolved into an international event. The Legendary Banked Slalom attracts many professionals from around the world as competitors and allows amateurs of all ages and abilities to compete on the same course over the same period with the professionals. The winner in each category receives a duct tape trophy and an embroidered Carhartt jacket.

== Featured in films ==
Mt. Baker Ski Area is often featured in ski and snowboard films and still photography due to its picturesque setting, plentiful snowfall, and the availability of easily accessed advanced terrain. The Call of The Wild was filmed at Mt. Baker in 1934–35.

Featured in Season 5, Episode 14 of the TV series, "Frasier", entitled "The Ski Lodge".

== Season and hours ==
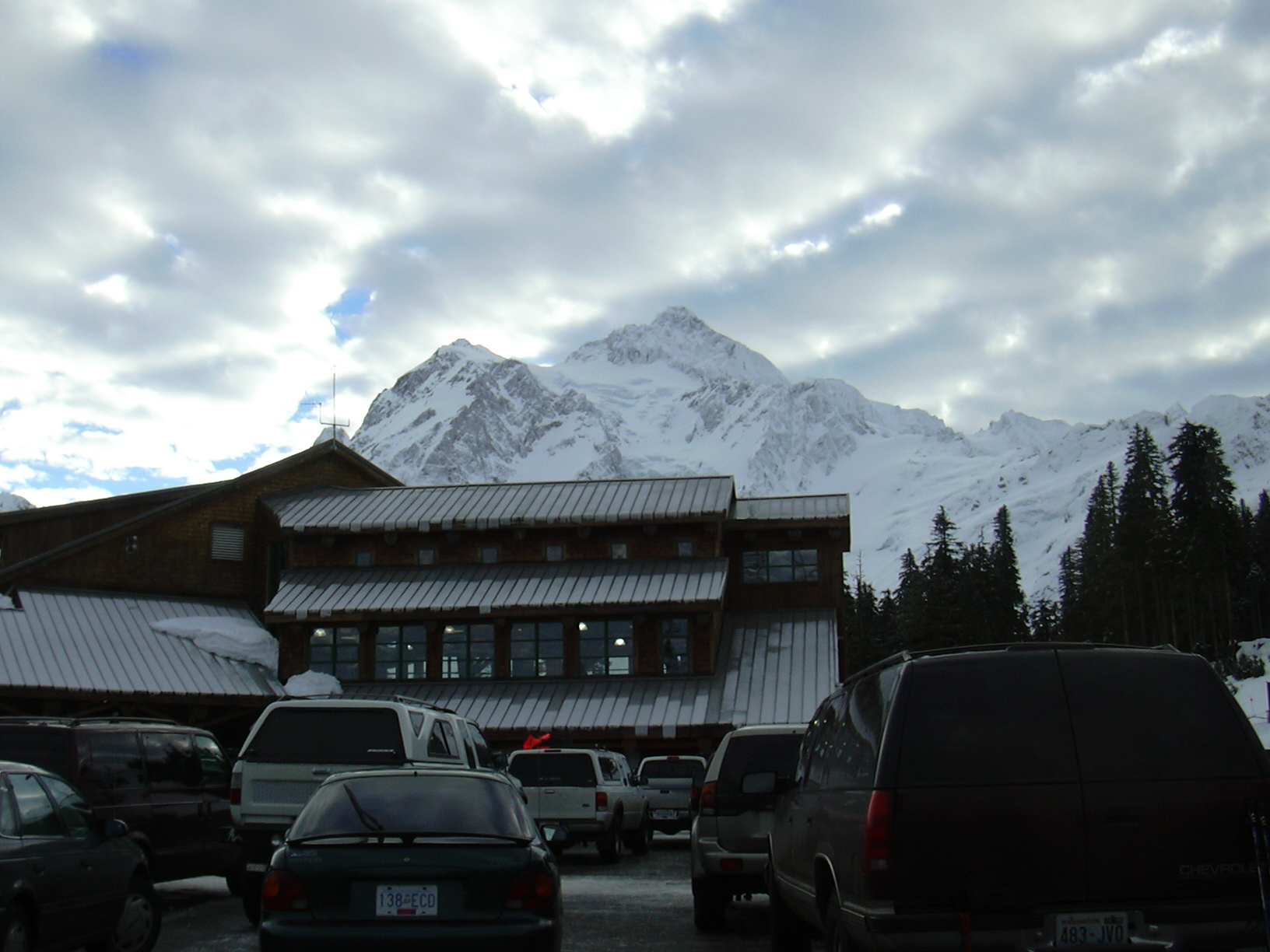
White Salmon Lodge and Mt. Shuksan

The ski season typically begins in late November and ends in late April. Usual operating hours are 9:00 a.m. to 3:30 p.m.

Year	Opening Date
2025	21-Dec
2024	20-Nov
2023	13-Dec
2022	18-Nov
2021	15-Dec
2020	20-Nov
2019	15-Dec
2018	18-Dec
2017	16-Nov
2016	25-Nov
2015	19-Nov
2014	20-Dec
2013	21-Nov
2012	21-Nov
2011	18-Nov
2010	20-Nov
2009	12-Nov
2008	14-Dec
2007	29-Nov

== History ==
- 1921–26: Mt. Baker highway constructed to Heather Meadows; skiing begins.
- 1927: Mount Baker Lodge opened. Mt. Baker Ski Club organized.
- 1930: First ski tournament at Heather Meadows.
- 1931: Mt. Baker Lodge destroyed by fire.
- 1935: Pacific Northwest Ski Association downhill tournament, held on northeast face of Table Mountain.
- 1935–36: "Ski escalator" installed.
- 1937–38: First rope tow installed, Otto Lang ski school.
- 1953: The first chairlift, Pan Dome (now Chair 1), is constructed at the ski area.
- 1977: Six chairs and four rope tows operate. They are referenced by name instead of number.
- 1981–88: One rope tow (Galena) is removed, and chairs are now numbered instead of named.
- 1989–90: The first quad chair (Chair 7) is installed in the White Salmon area. One more rope tow (7 Hills) is removed.
- 1991–98: Chair 8 opens.
- 1996: White Salmon Day Lodge opens.
- 2002: Chair 4 and Chair 5 doubles replaced with Chair 5 quad.
- 2011: Chairs 1 and 6 designated as "Experts only".
