= Sumas Mountain (Washington) =

Mountain in United States of America

- Location within Washington (state)

Highest point
- Elevation: 3,434 ft (1,047 m) NAVD 88
- Prominence: 2,870 ft (870 m)
- Coordinates: 48°54′42″N 122°13′20″W

Geography
- Location: Whatcom County, Washington, U.S.
- Parent range: Skagit Range, North Cascades
- Topo map: USGS Kendall

Sumas Mountain is a mountain located in Whatcom County, Washington, 15 miles northeast of Bellingham and southwest of Vedder Mountain. Located in the Skagit Range, the mountain is notable for its high biodiversity and year-round hiking trails. It is sometimes referred to as American Sumas to distinguish it from an identically named mountain across the Canada–United States border in British Columbia just 10 km (6.2 mi) to the north, both of which are drained by tributary creeks of the Sumas River.

The mountain is largely owned by the Washington Department of Natural Resources, but some parcels are privately held. While the public land is open for recreation, it is managed primarily for timber harvest. Clearcuts are present on many slopes and most all the remaining forest is in varying stages of recovery and regrowth.

Washington State Route 547, which traverses a low pass on the mountain's northern flank, runs northwest from the Mount Baker Highway, (SR 542) in Kendall to SR 9 in Sumas, which is located on the Canada–United States border and south of Abbotsford, British Columbia. The Chicago, Milwaukee, St. Paul and Pacific Railroad once traversed the same pass.

The controversial Swift Creek Landslide is located on the mountain's western slope.

== See also ==
- Sumas Mountain (British Columbia)
- Sumas Peak
- Sumas (disambiguation)
