= Water park =

Amusement park that features pools with water play areas

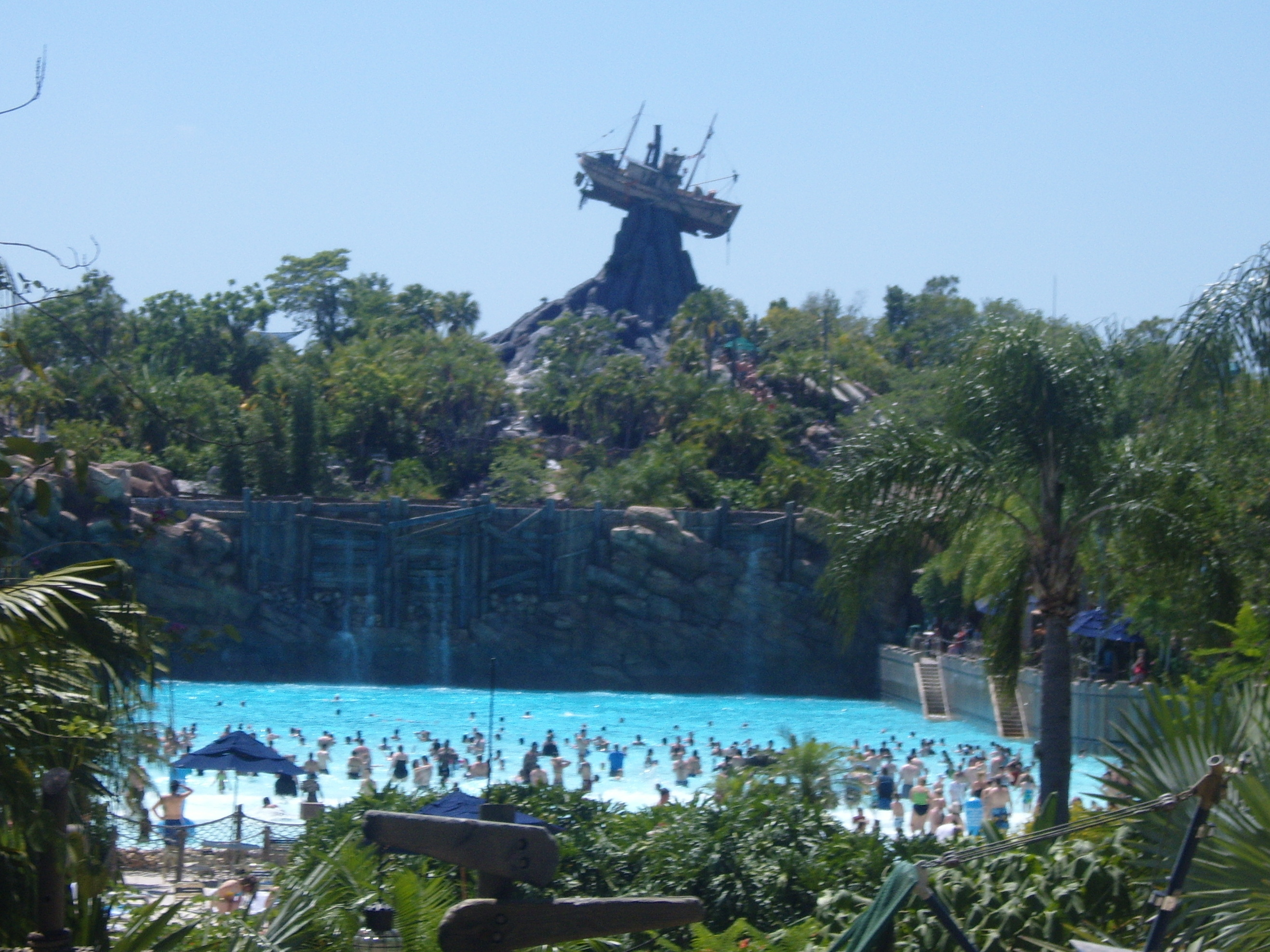
Typhoon Lagoon at Walt Disney World is the most visited water park in North America, and the second most visited in the world

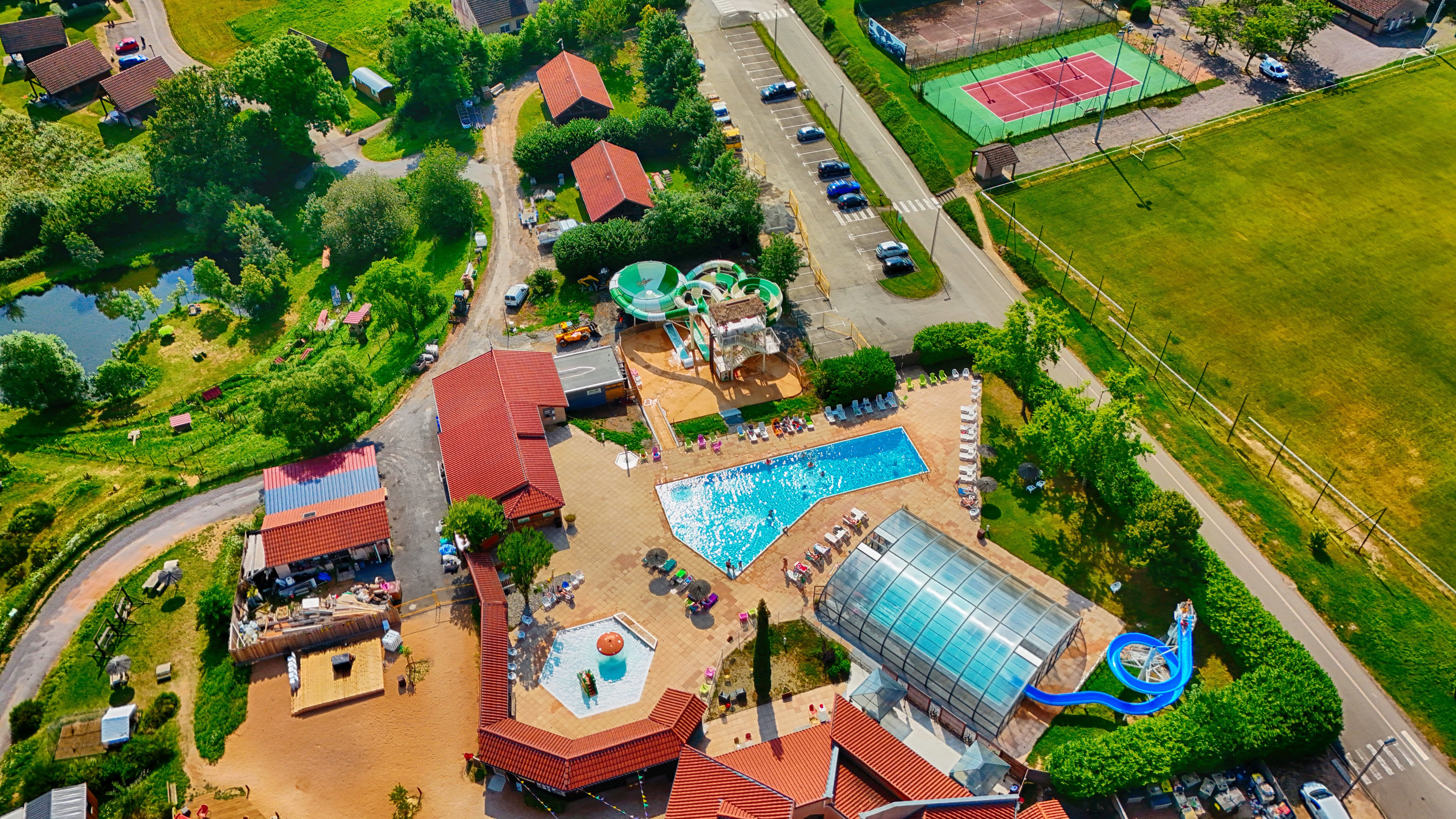
Aerial view of an outdoor water park

A water park (also waterpark, water world, or aquapark) is an amusement park that features water play areas such as swimming pools, hot tubs, water slides, splash pads, water playgrounds, and lazy rivers, as well as areas for floating, bathing, swimming, and other barefoot environments. Modern water parks may also be equipped with some type of artificial surfing or bodyboarding environment, such as a wave pool or flowrider.

== History ==
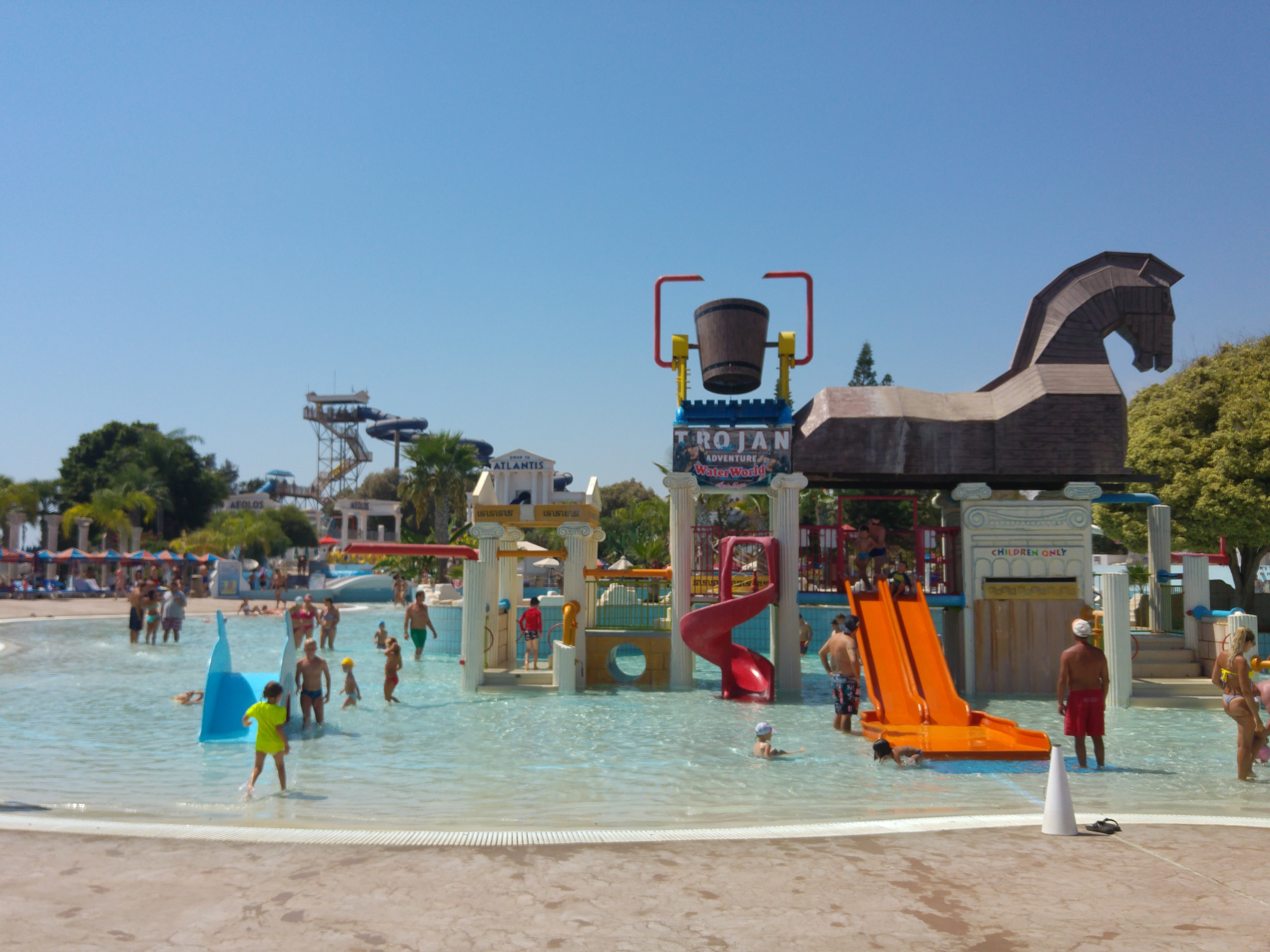
Children's play area at WaterWorld Themed Waterpark in Ayia Napa, Cyprus

Water parks have grown in popularity since their roots in public swimming pools in the late 1940s and early 1950s. The United States has the largest and most concentrated water park market, with over 1,000 water parks and dozens of new parks opening each year. Major organizations are the IAAPA (International Association of Amusement Parks and Attractions) and WWA (World Waterpark Association), which is the industry trade association.

Water parks that emerge from spas tend to more closely resemble mountain resorts, as they become year-round destinations. For example, Splash Universe Water Park Resort is themed to match the community in which it is located. The theme is intended to enhance the community's destination appeal. Therefore, the amusement and leisure-time industry is becoming more concentrated, as winter sports are becoming common themes in summertime water recreation.

A process of concentration can be observed in the hybrid versions of theme-, amusement-, and water parks. Some water parks are more spa-oriented. For example, SchwabenQuellen has no water slides; it has instead many saunas, steam rooms, "adventure showers", and relaxation-oriented water play areas.

In the 2000s, an effort was made to reduce long waiting lines by introducing conveyor belts to lift passengers or use water jets.

An unusual feature at a water park is ice skating. Deep River Water Park in northwestern Indiana features ice skating, made possible by cooling pipes installed under their massive plaza.

== Indoor water parks ==
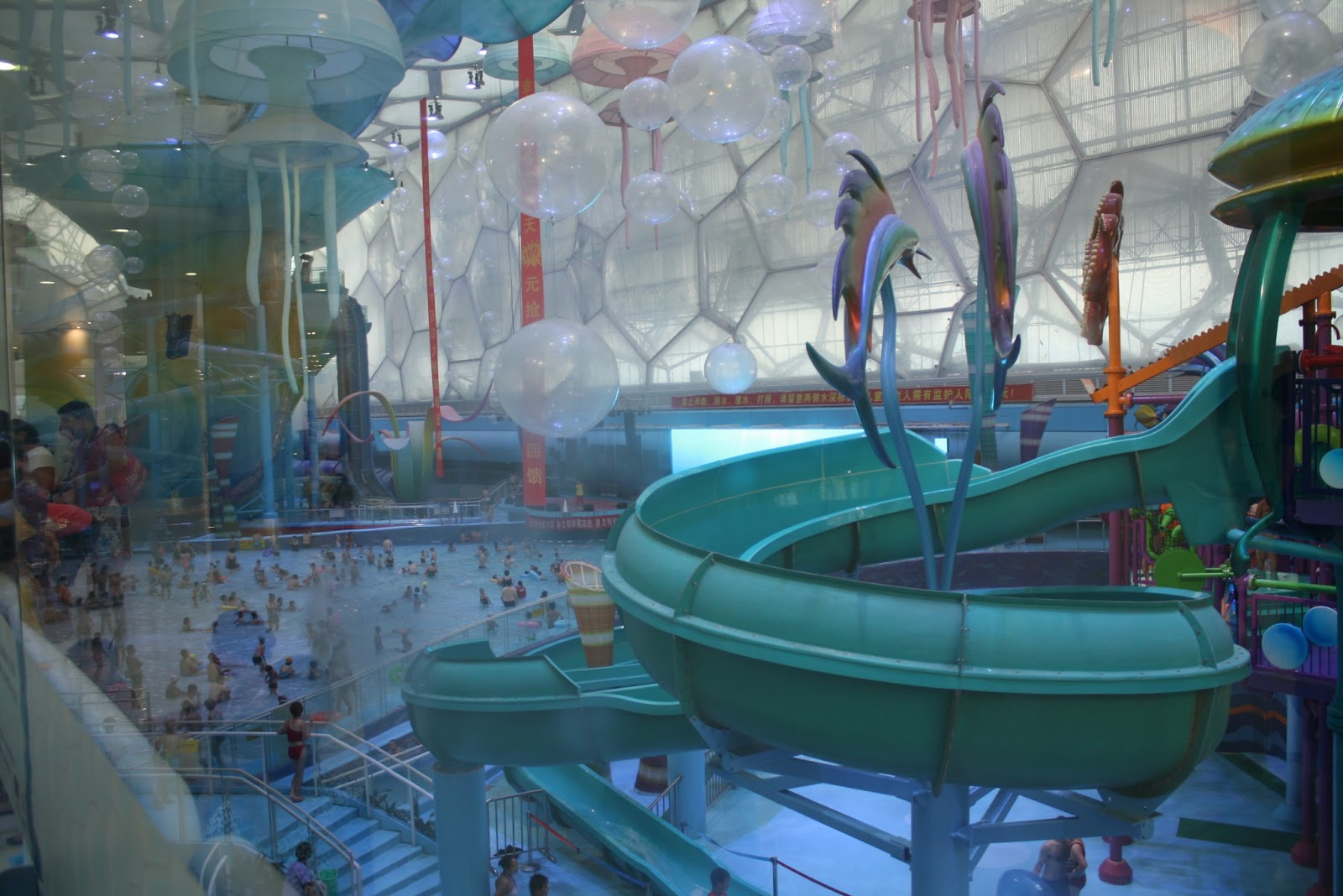
A modern indoor water park in China

Some of the first indoor water parks are Tikibad at Duinrell (The Netherlands, 1984), Nautiland located at Haguenau (France, 1984), the Aqua Mundo at Center Parc De Eemhof located at Zeewolde (The Netherlands, 1980) and Alpamare (Pfäffikon) (Switzerland, 1977).

In 1986 World Waterpark was open in Edmonton, Alberta, Canada at the West Edmonton Mall. It is in 2016 the largest indoor water park in North America.

Tropical Islands Resort (Germany), with an area of 66,000 m^{2} (710,418 sq ft), was in 2016 the largest indoor water park in the world.

With five indoor water parks, Wisconsin Dells, Wisconsin has been dubbed the "Water Park Capital of the World". It showcases several of America's largest indoor and outdoor water parks, such as Noah's Ark Water Park. Wisconsin Dells is also home to the first indoor water park in the United States, which was debuted in 1994 by the Polynesian Resort Hotel.

Success in extending the tourist season and turning water park resorts into vacation destinations has resulted in tremendous industry growth. Usually, resort hotels featuring massive indoor water parks have been reserved for overnight guests. Companies like Great Wolf Resorts/Great Wolf Lodge and Kalahari Resorts have branched out from their origin in Wisconsin Dells to open new locations around the country. Mt. Olympus Theme and Water Park (formerly Family Land) is another huge water park in the Dells.

The largest indoor water park in the UK is Sandcastle Water Park in Blackpool, England, which opened in 1986.

There are many water parks in southern Europe where the climate suits a long season. For example, in Portugal's Algarve, there are three main parks: Aqualand, Aquashow, and Slide and Splash.

== Water play areas ==
Water play areas are similar to water parks and include urban beaches, splash pads, and smaller collections of water slides in many hotels and public swimming pools.

For example, the Chelsea Hotel in Toronto features a four-story water slide called the Corkscrew.

== Safety ==
According to estimates from the U.S. Consumer Product Safety Commission, more than 4,200 people annually are sent to emergency rooms suffering injuries on public waterslides. In July 2015, one drowning and at least three near-drownings were reported at water parks in the United States.

On August 7, 2016, Caleb Schwab, the 10-year-old son of American politician Scott Schwab, was decapitated on the Verrückt water ride at the Schlitterbahn water park in Kansas City, Kansas. Following the fatal incident, Verrückt permanently closed.

== Gallery ==
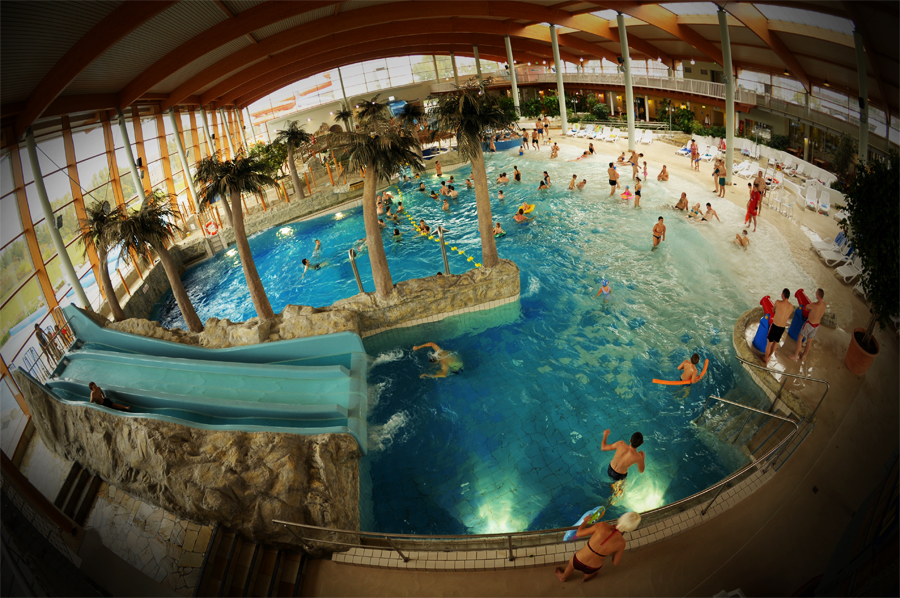
Aquapark Wrocław in Wrocław, Poland

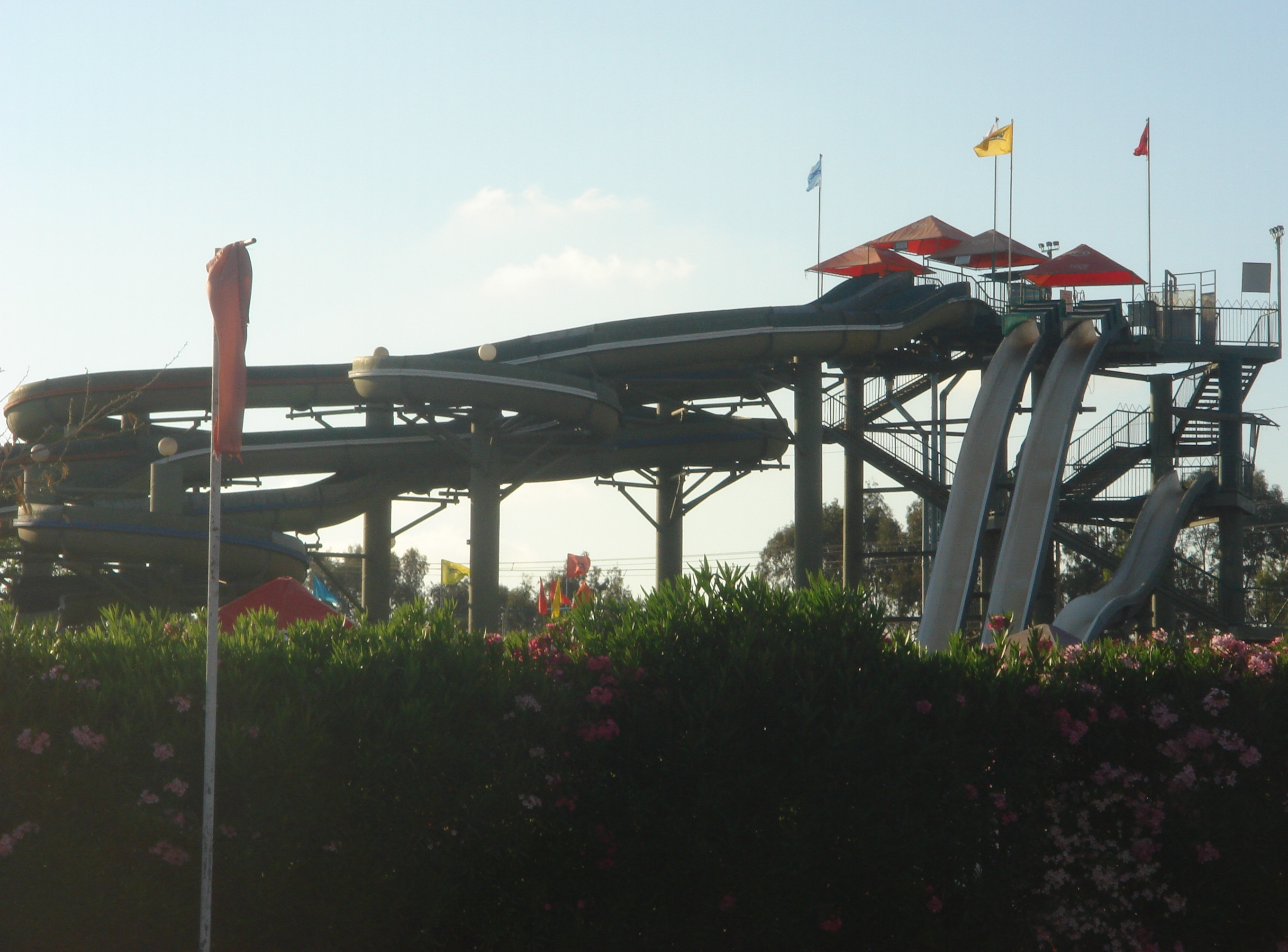
Meymadion in near Tel Aviv, Israel

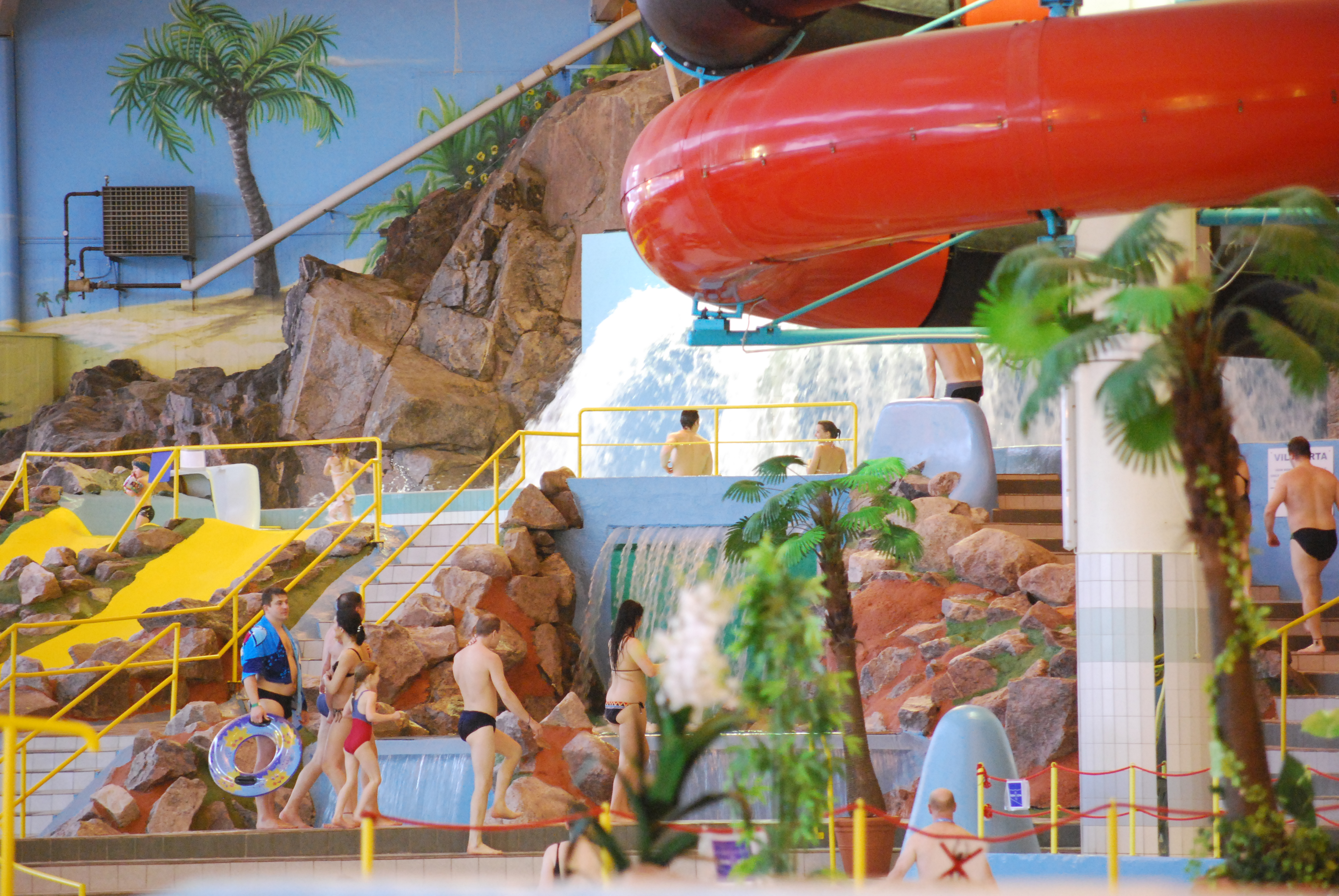
Serena Waterpark in Lahnus, Espoo, Finland

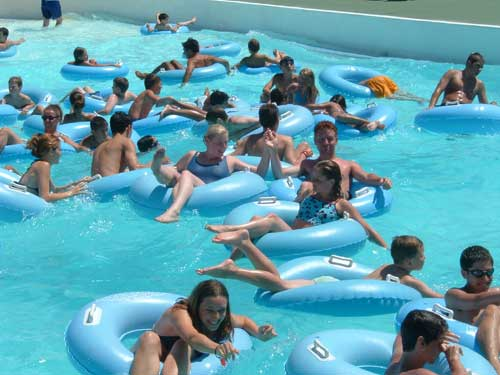
A water park with a wave pool

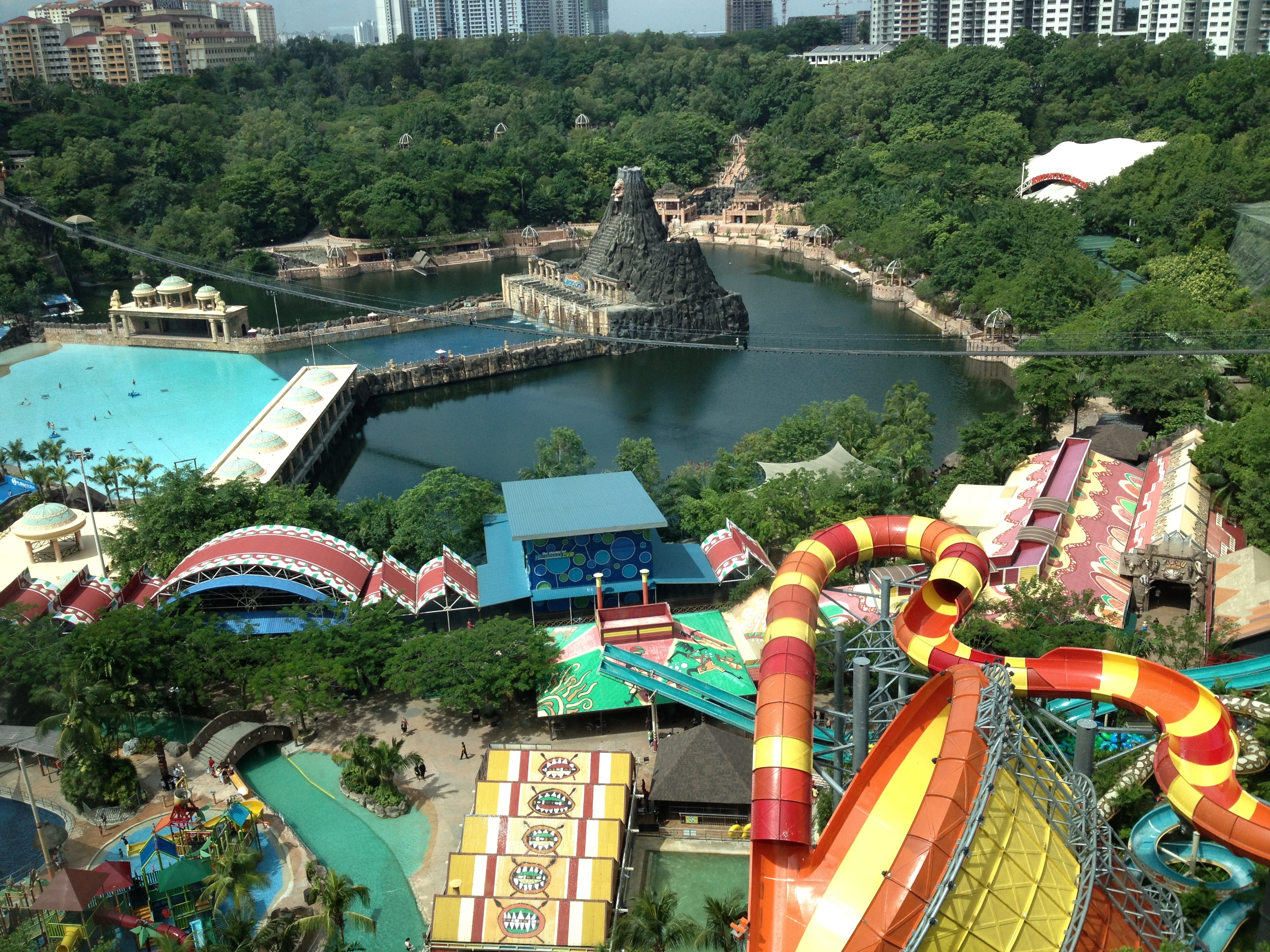
Aerial view of the Sunway Lagoon in Bandar Sunway, Malaysia

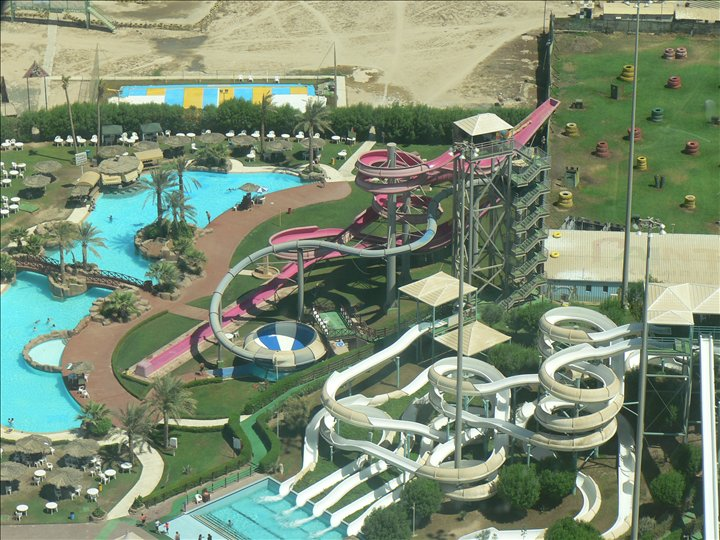
Aqua Park, water-theme park in Kuwait City, Kuwait

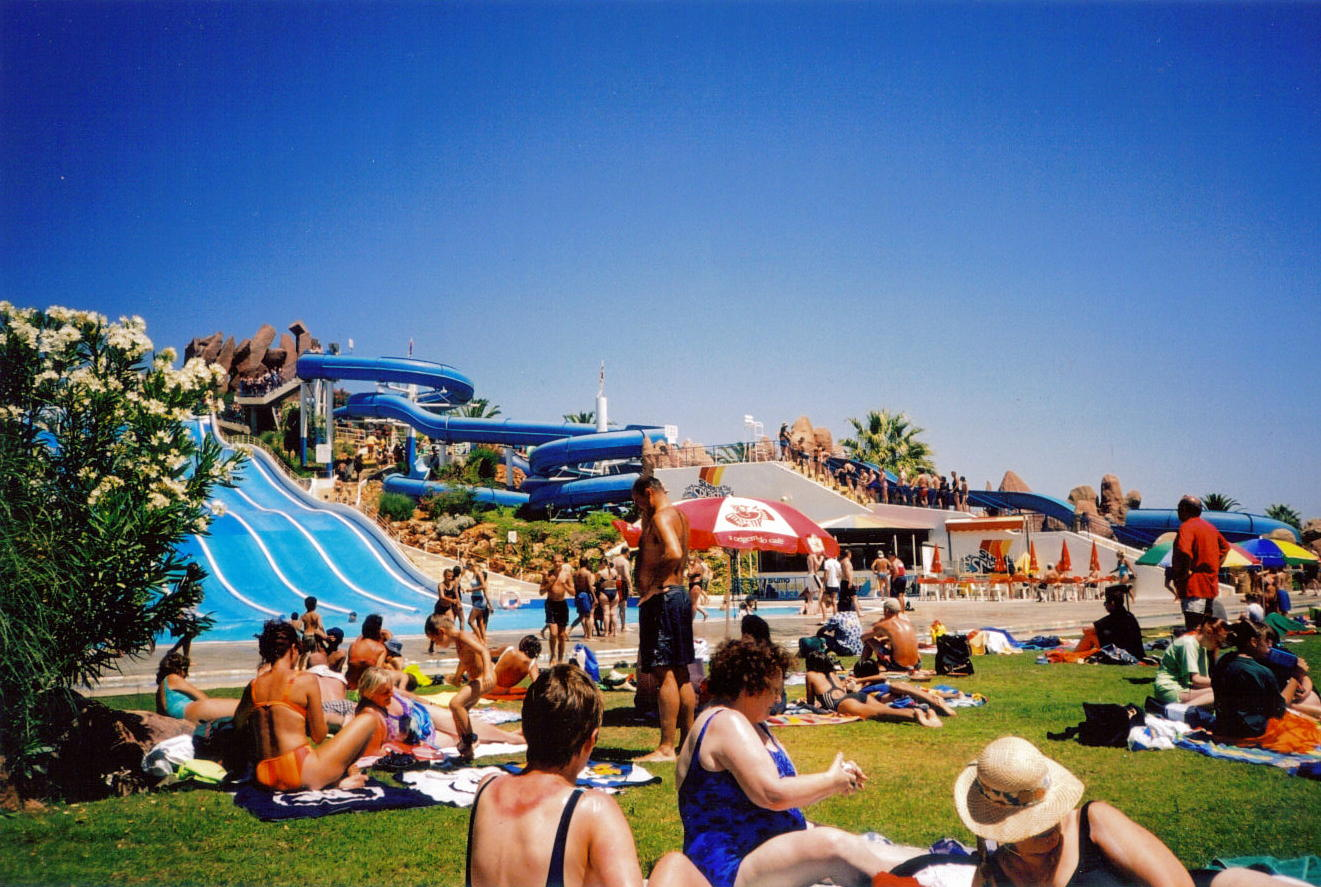
Fasouri Watermania Water Park in Limassol, Cyprus

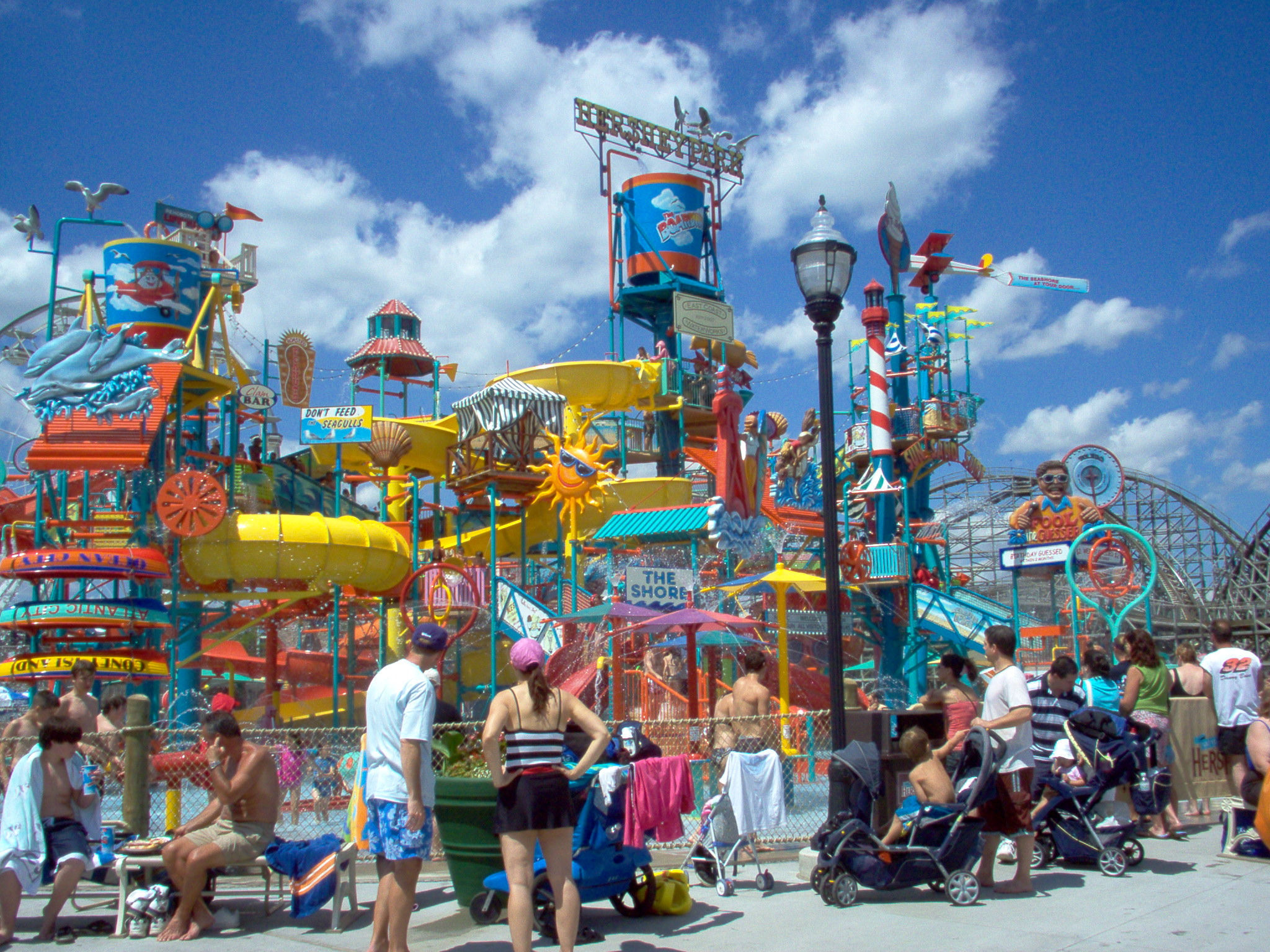
Hersheypark's boardwalk, Hershey, Pennsylvania, United States

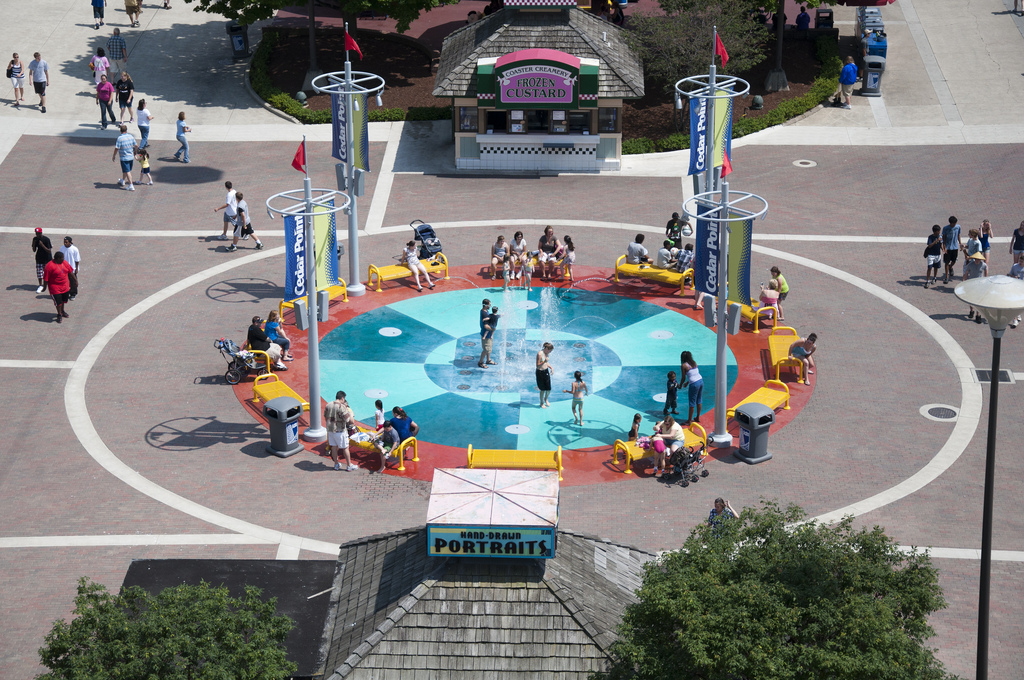
A splash area at Cedar Point, Sandusky, Ohio, U.S.

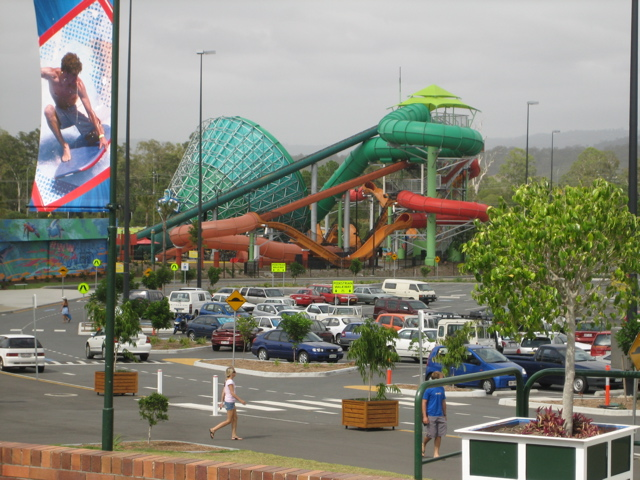
WhiteWater World in Queensland, Australia

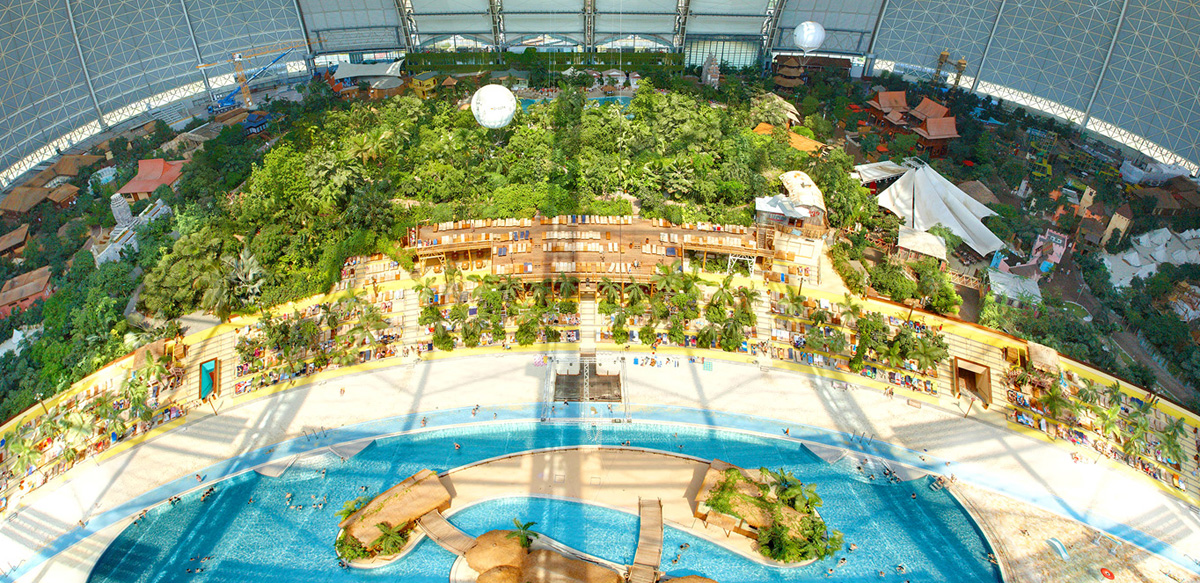
Tropical Islands Resort in Krausnick, Germany

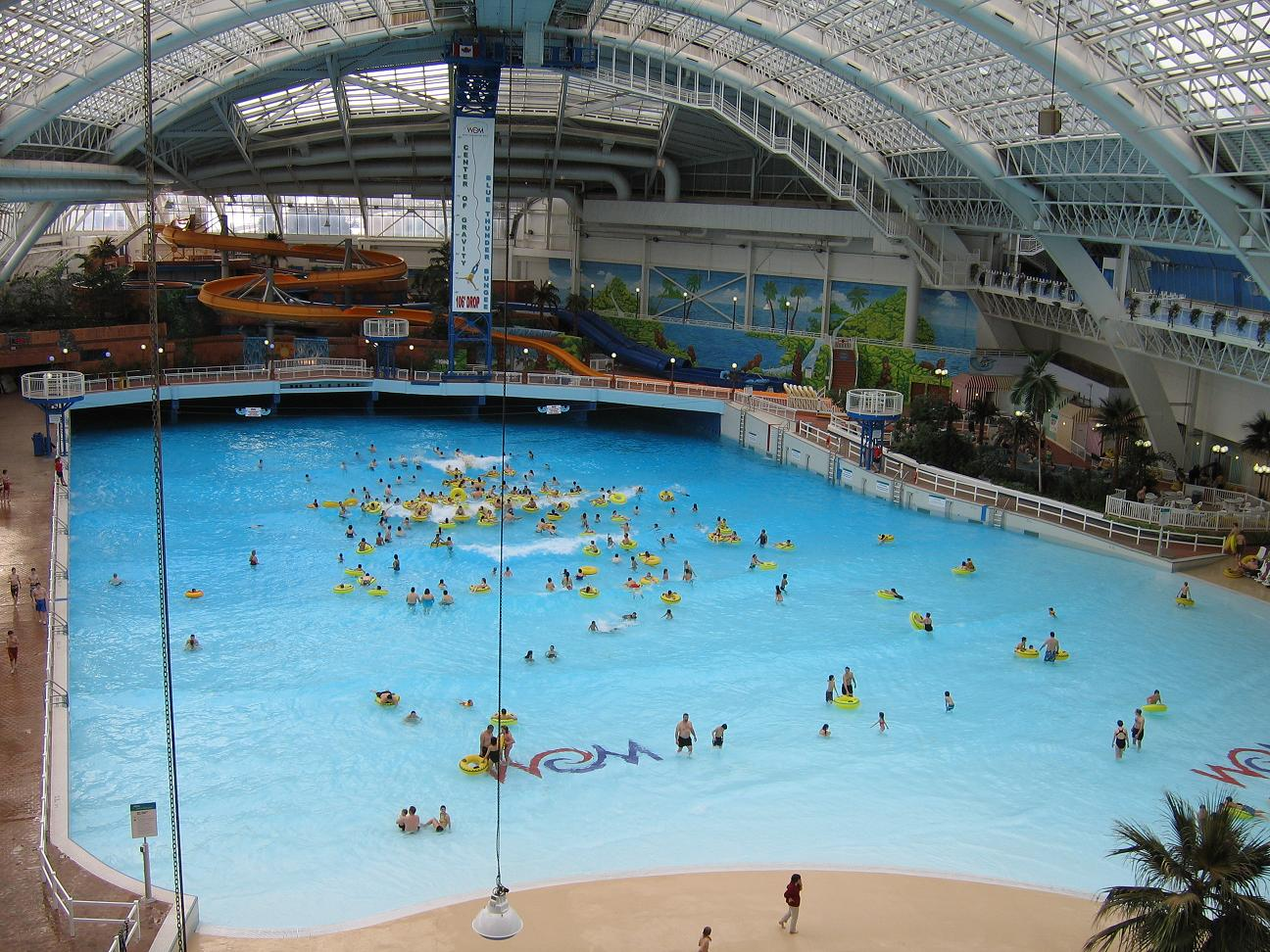
World Waterpark in Edmonton, Alberta, Canada, North America's second largest indoor water park

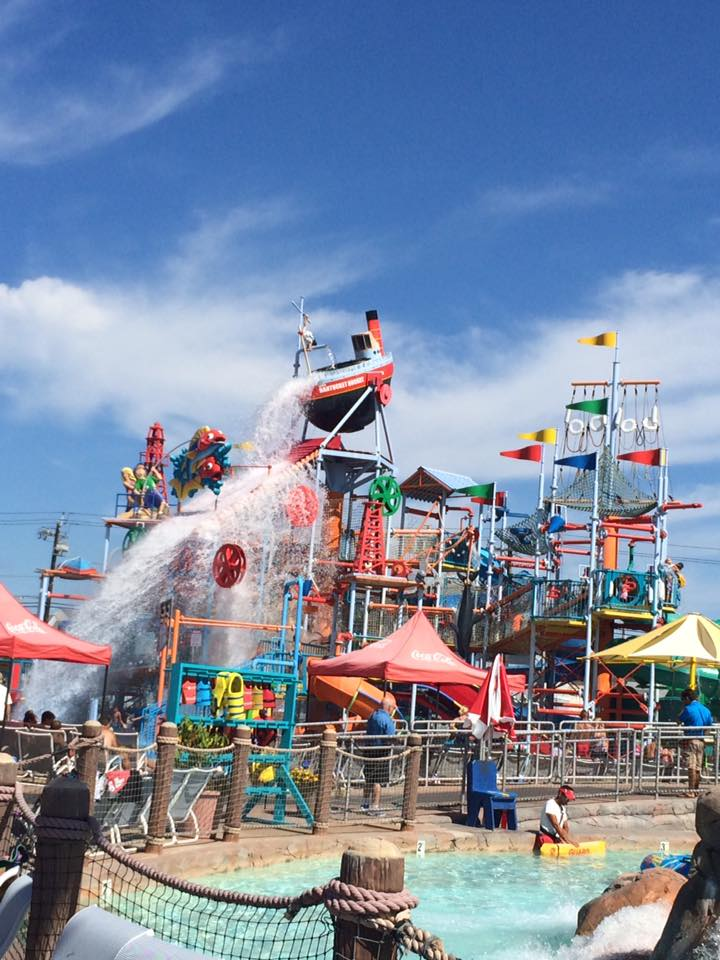
Breakwater Beach water park in Seaside Heights, New Jersey, U.S.

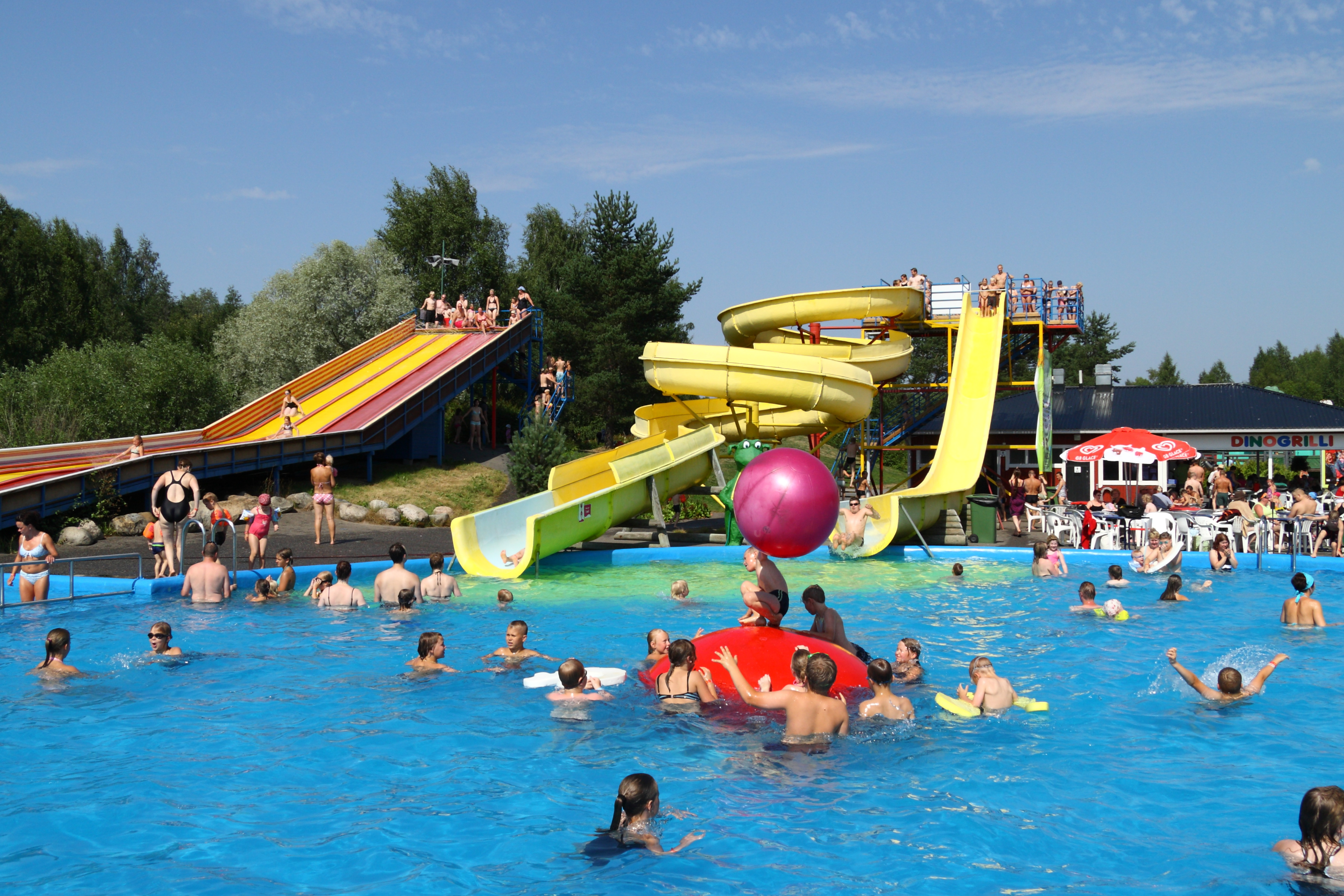
Dinosauria Water Slides at Visulahti in Mikkeli, Finland

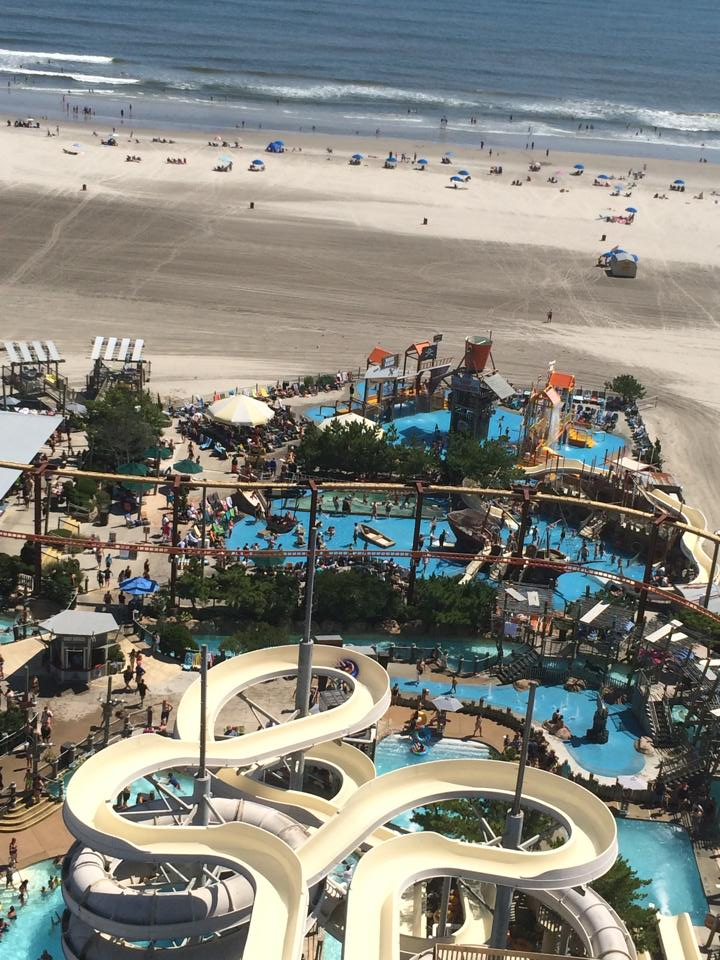
Raging Waters water park at Morey's Piers in Wildwood, New Jersey, U.S. (taken from the Ferris wheel)

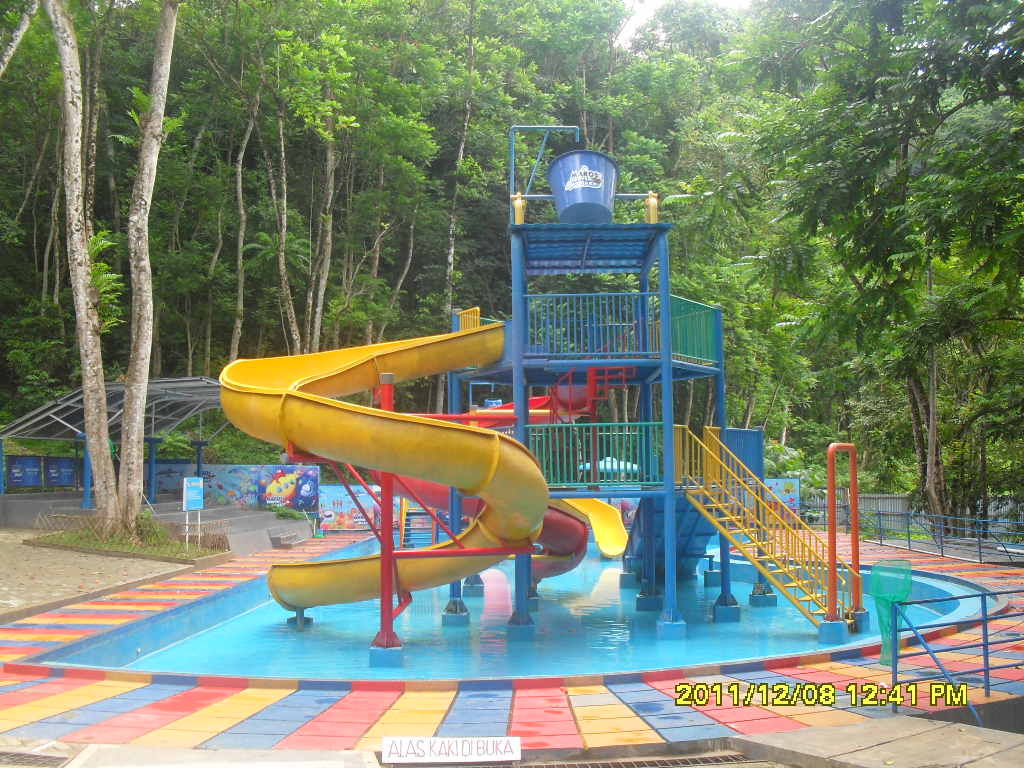
A small waterpark

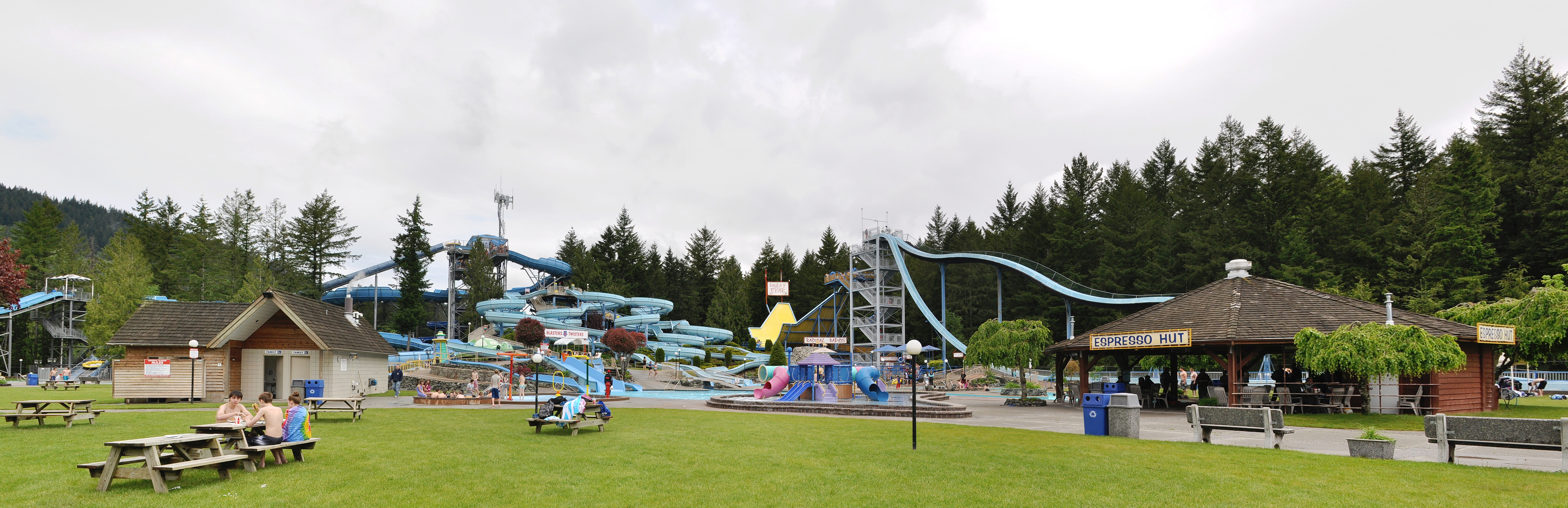
A panoramic view of Cultus Lake Waterpark, Cultus Lake, British Columbia, Canada

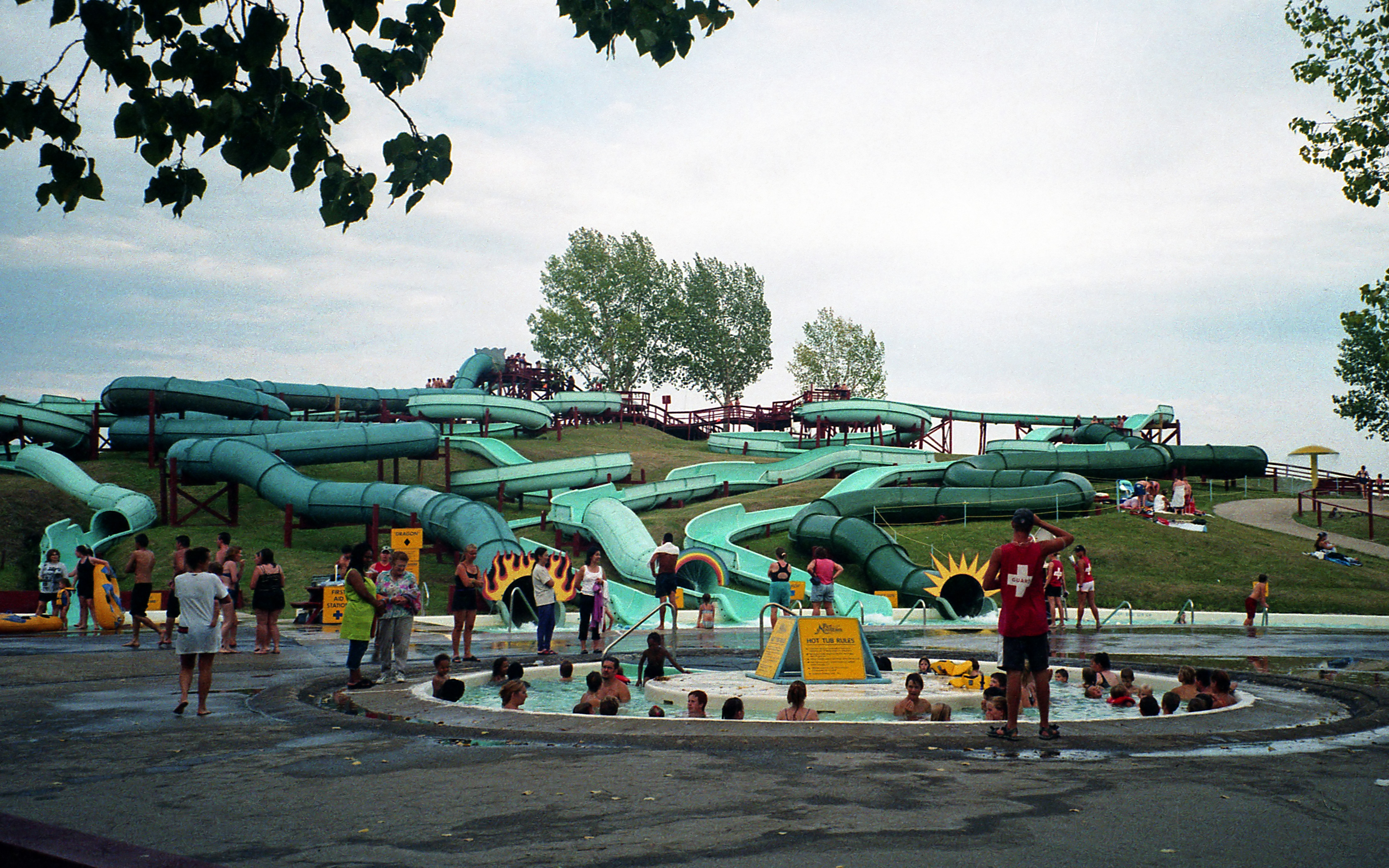
Fun Mountain Waterpark, Winnipeg, Manitoba, Canada

== See also ==
- Indoor water park
- List of water parks
