= SchwabenQuellen =

Waterpark complex located in Stuttgart, Germany

Coordinates: 48.722364°N 9.160837°E

Schwaben Quellen (in English, "Swabian Springs") is a large spa/waterpark complex located in Stuttgart, Germany. The Schwaben Quellen is associated with the SI-Centrum (Stuttgart International Centrum), an entertainment complex in Stuttgart.

It is a member of the European Waterparks Association (EWA), and provides saunas, steamrooms, and various kinds of baths. There are also what are referred to as "adventure showers". A small room full of snow, kept at −20 °C (−4 °F), is also available, so that participants can roll in the snow naked (this often follows use of a sauna or other type of steam room). Like many German bathing areas, people are expected to be nude throughout the sauna part of the resort.

Some of the baths are indoors, and others are outdoors, providing a good mix of different bathing environments. There is an indoor restaurant overlooking some of the baths, where a meal can be purchased using the wristband that also functions as a key and a locator. The wristband is coded for the locker into which the participants place their clothing and personal effects, and the wristband serves as point of contact, with an embedded microchip which tracks the bathers throughout the facility.
