= Sweltzer River =

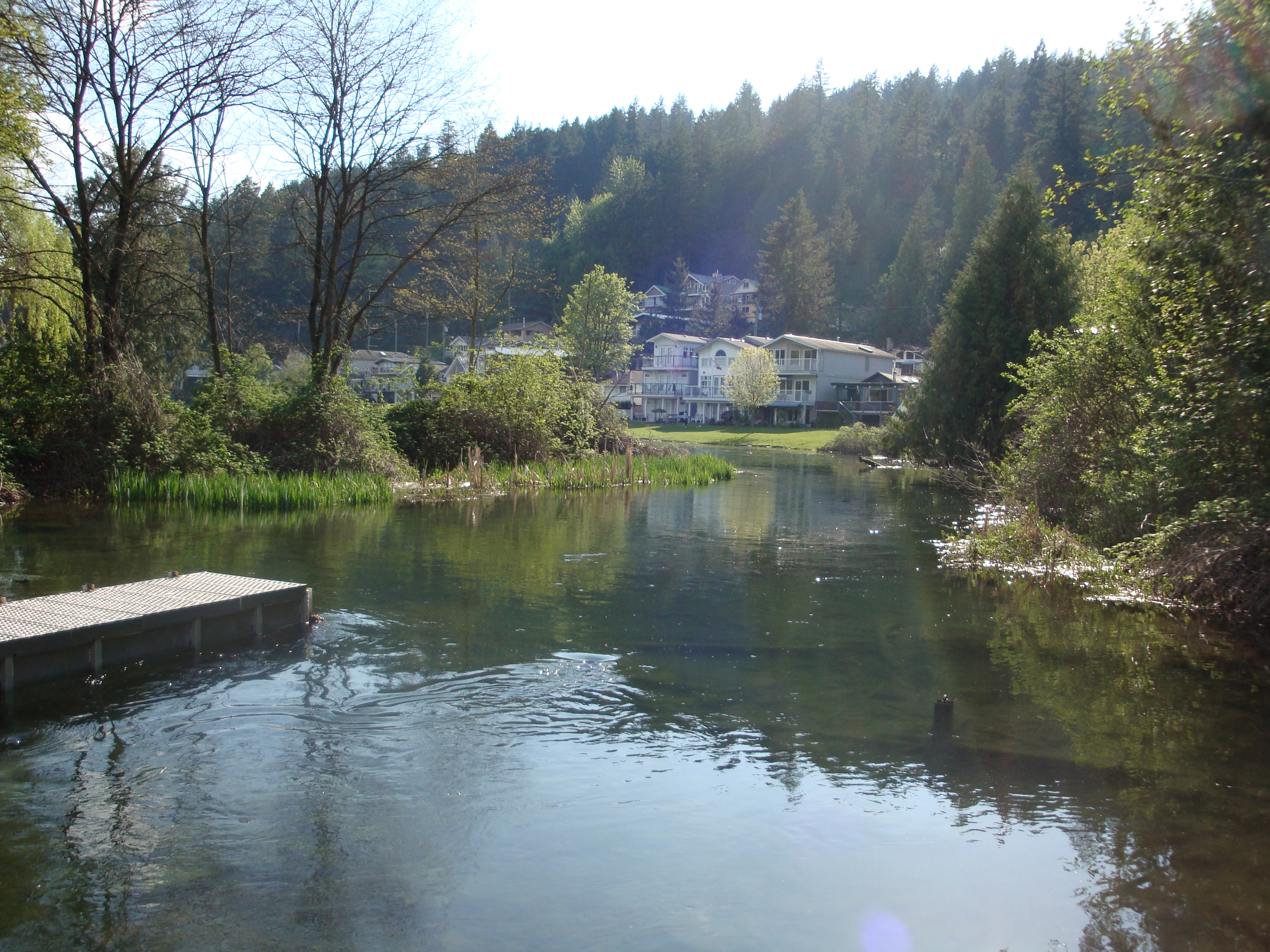

- Location of the mouth of the Sweltzer River in British Columbia

Location
- Country: Canada
- Province: British Columbia

Physical characteristics
- Source: Cultus Lake
  - location: Cascade Mountains
  - coordinates: 49°04′33″N 121°58′53″W
  - elevation: 151 ft (46 m)
- Mouth: Chilliwack River
  - coordinates: 49°05′49″N 121°57′50″W
  - elevation: 110 ft (34 m)

The Sweltzer River is a river in British Columbia, Canada, that drains the waters of Cultus Lake into the Chilliwack River. It is about 3 kilometres (2 mi) long, and much of it runs through Soowahlie Indian Reserve No. 14, which is under the administration of the Soowahlie Indian Band.

The name Sweltzer River was applied on an 1895 map to Liumchen Creek, which is to the northeast.

== See also ==
- List of rivers of British Columbia
