= Cultus Lake Waterpark =

Water park in British Columbia

- Interactive map of Cultus Lake Waterpark
- Slogan: BC's BIGGEST Waterpark!
- Location: Destination Cultus, Cultus Lake, British Columbia, Canada
- Coordinates: 49.07634°N 121.97443°W
- Theme: Water park
- Owner: Chris Steunenberg
- Opened: 1984
- Operating season: June-September
- Status: Active
- Area: 6.4 acres (2.6 hectares)
- Website: www.cultus.com/cultus-lake-waterpark/

Cultus Lake Waterpark is one of the three amusement parks operated by Destination Cultus in Cultus Lake, British Columbia, with the others being Cultus Lake Adventure Park and Splashdown Vernon. It claims to be the largest water park in the province, at 6.4 acres (2.6 hectares).

== History ==
The park has been operating since 1984.

The park was temporarily closed in June 2020 due to the COVID-19 pandemic but reopened on July 1 with increased precautions.

On June 15, 2026, 12 children were injured and hospitalized after an electrical incident. The children were hurt after touching a railing while waiting to go on the Zero to 60 ride. All of the kids have since been discharged from the hospital. On June 20th, 2026, site wide inspections were being conducted. A phased reopening began on July 29. By August 24, all waterslides had reopened after extensive work at the waterpark. The final investigative report by Technical Safety BC had not been published as of 23 October 2026.

== Rides ==
As of 2023, the park has 17 separate attractions:

1. Bazooka Bowls - Slide into a 30 ft (9.1 m) bowl in which the rider swirls around for a few seconds before falling 9 ft (2.7 m)
2. Blaster & Twisters - Three interweaving waterslides
3. Freefall - Slide with 72 ft (22 m) vertical drop
4. The Rattler - Dark snake-themed slide
5. Speedslide - Fastest slide, starting at the same height as Freefall
6. Zero - 60 - Face-first race on mats
7. Boomerang - Four-person raft from 60 ft (18 m)
8. Colossal Canyon - Group raft; largest waterslide in Western Canada
9. Radical Rapids - Two-person tube
10. Tubular Terror - Two-person black hole complex of three slides
11. Valley of Fear - Freefall tube slide, with a 45 ft (14 m) drop
12. Adventure River - 350 ft (110 m) long and 30 in (76 cm) deep lazy river
13. Hot Tubs - Five hot tubs
14. Pirates' Cove - Kids' miniature park
15. Tots Castle - Small castle for toddlers
16. Family Spray Park - Geysers and water cannons
17. Turtle Pool & Slides - Wading pool and small slides

A map of the park can be found here.

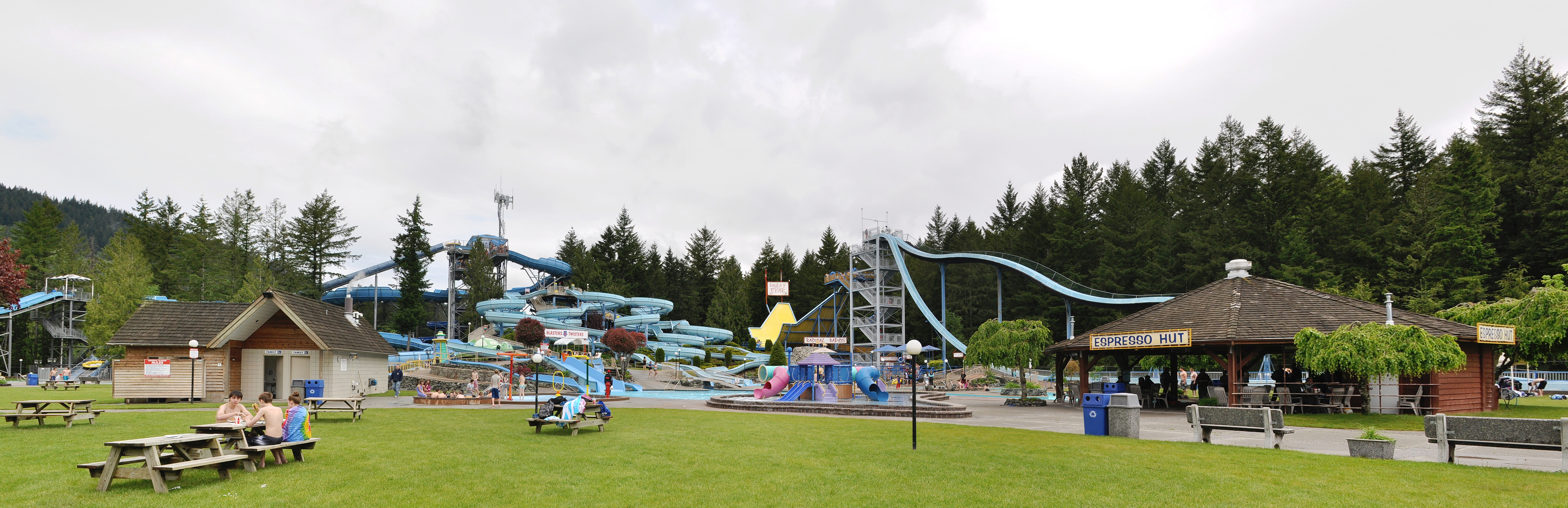
Panorama of the park

== Features ==
The park has food stands, mainly serving burgers, pizza, coffee, ice cream, and candy. The area also offers cabanas for rent.
