= Cultus Lake, British Columbia =

Lake in Canada

Cultus Lake
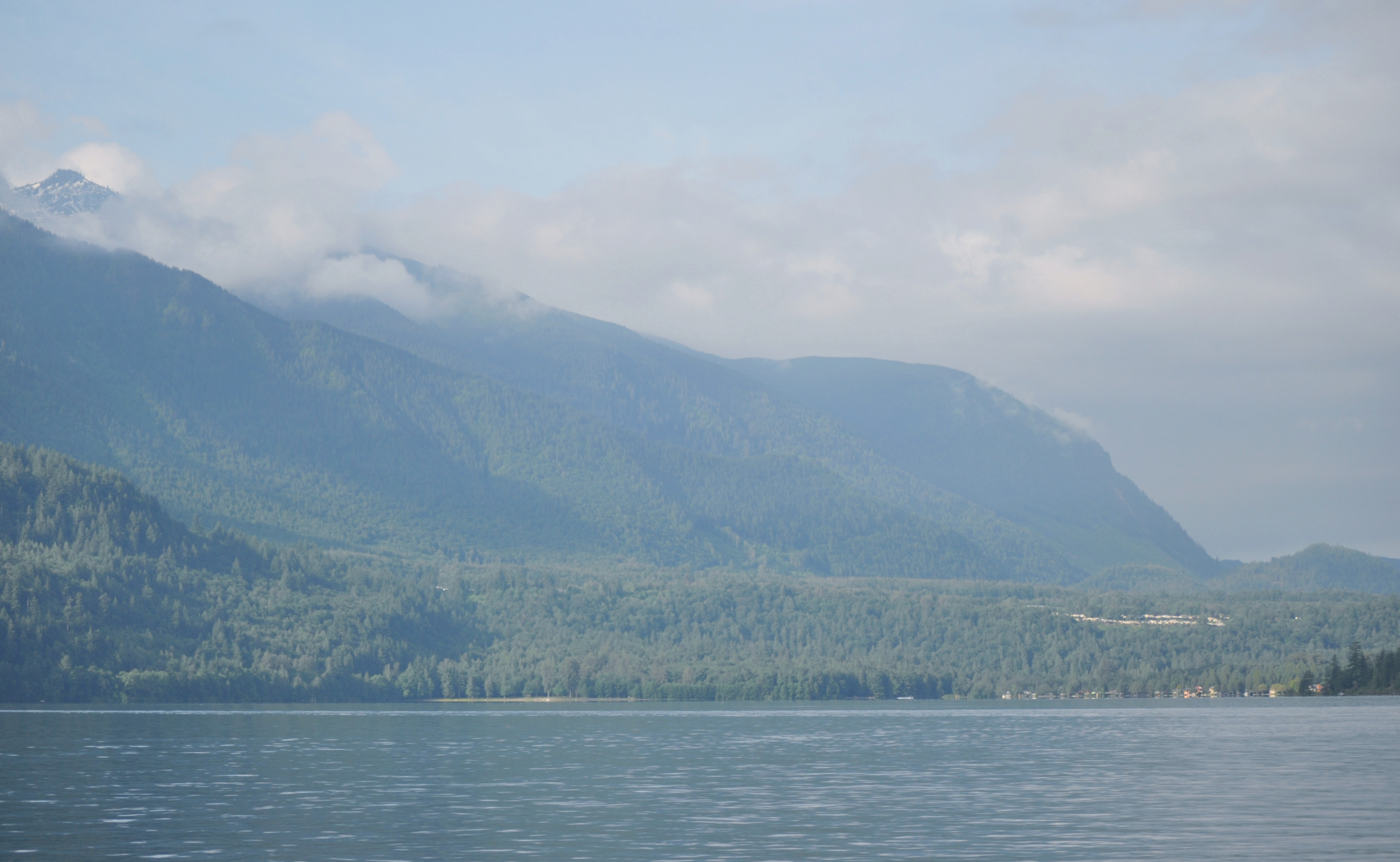

- Location within British Columbia
- Location: Fraser Valley, British Columbia
- Coordinates: 49.0533°N 121.9867°W
- Primary inflows: Frosst Creek, Ascaphus Creek, Smith Falls Creek, Windfall Creek, Clear Creek, Teapot Creek, Watt Creek
- Primary outflows: Sweltzer River
- Catchment area: 65 km^{2} (25 sq mi)
- Basin countries: Canada
- Surface area: 6.3 km^{2} (2.4 sq mi)
- Average depth: 32 metres (105 ft)
- Max. depth: 41.8 metres (137 ft)
- Water volume: 0.2 cubic kilometres (0.048 cu mi)
- Residence time: 692 days
- Shore length^{1}: 14 kilometres (8.7 mi)
- Surface elevation: 47 metres (154 ft)
- ^{1} Shore length is not a well-defined measure.

Cultus Lake is a lake, associated community and provincial park in the Fraser Valley region of British Columbia, Canada. It is the source of the Sweltzer River. Cultus Lake is located 11 kilometres (6.8 mi) south of the Chilliwack River, near the city of Chilliwack and approximately 80 kilometres (50 mi) east of Vancouver. In 1950, Cultus Lake became a provincial park of British Columbia. Cultus Lake covers an area of 656 hectares, evenly on either side of the lake. At one time the lake had a sawmill and booming ground until it became a provincial park in the 1950s.

== Etymology ==
Cultus Lake is an important place for spirit quests of the Sto:lo people. The traditional Ts’elxwéyeqw name for the lake is Swílhcha’ meaning ‘an empty basin that quickly filled with water’ or ‘somebody died’. Cultus is a Chinook Jargon word meaning primarily bad, worthless, or good for nothing, though the same word can also mean free, without purpose, or simply nothing. It possibly acquired this name after the spiritual power of the lake was used up owing to its popularity.

== Climate ==
Climate data for Cultus Lake
Month	Jan	Feb	Mar	Apr	May	Jun	Jul	Aug	Sep	Oct	Nov	Dec	Year
Record high °C (°F)	18.0 (64.4)	20.6 (69.1)	24.5 (76.1)	30.0 (86.0)	38.0 (100.4)	43.7 (110.7)	37.8 (100.0)	38.0 (100.4)	36.5 (97.7)	28.6 (83.5)	22.8 (73.0)	19.0 (66.2)	43.7 (110.7)
Mean daily maximum °C (°F)	5.5 (41.9)	8.0 (46.4)	10.8 (51.4)	14.2 (57.6)	17.7 (63.9)	20.3 (68.5)	23.9 (75.0)	24.4 (75.9)	20.7 (69.3)	15.1 (59.2)	8.3 (46.9)	5.0 (41.0)	14.5 (58.1)
Daily mean °C (°F)	2.4 (36.3)	4.2 (39.6)	6.3 (43.3)	9.0 (48.2)	12.5 (54.5)	15.2 (59.4)	17.9 (64.2)	18.3 (64.9)	15.1 (59.2)	10.4 (50.7)	5.2 (41.4)	2.4 (36.3)	9.9 (49.8)
Mean daily minimum °C (°F)	−0.7 (30.7)	0.4 (32.7)	1.8 (35.2)	3.8 (38.8)	7.3 (45.1)	10.0 (50.0)	11.8 (53.2)	12.2 (54.0)	9.5 (49.1)	5.7 (42.3)	2.1 (35.8)	−0.3 (31.5)	5.3 (41.5)
Record low °C (°F)	−20.6 (−5.1)	−18.9 (−2.0)	−12.8 (9.0)	−3.9 (25.0)	−2.8 (27.0)	1.7 (35.1)	3.9 (39.0)	2.2 (36.0)	0.0 (32.0)	−8.0 (17.6)	−18.0 (−0.4)	−21.7 (−7.1)	−21.7 (−7.1)
Average precipitation mm (inches)	204.5 (8.05)	152.2 (5.99)	139.3 (5.48)	115.1 (4.53)	94.3 (3.71)	83.3 (3.28)	52.8 (2.08)	56.6 (2.23)	84.4 (3.32)	145.3 (5.72)	233.8 (9.20)	205.5 (8.09)	1,566.9 (61.69)
Source 1: 1971–2000 Environment Canada
Source 2:

== Recreation ==
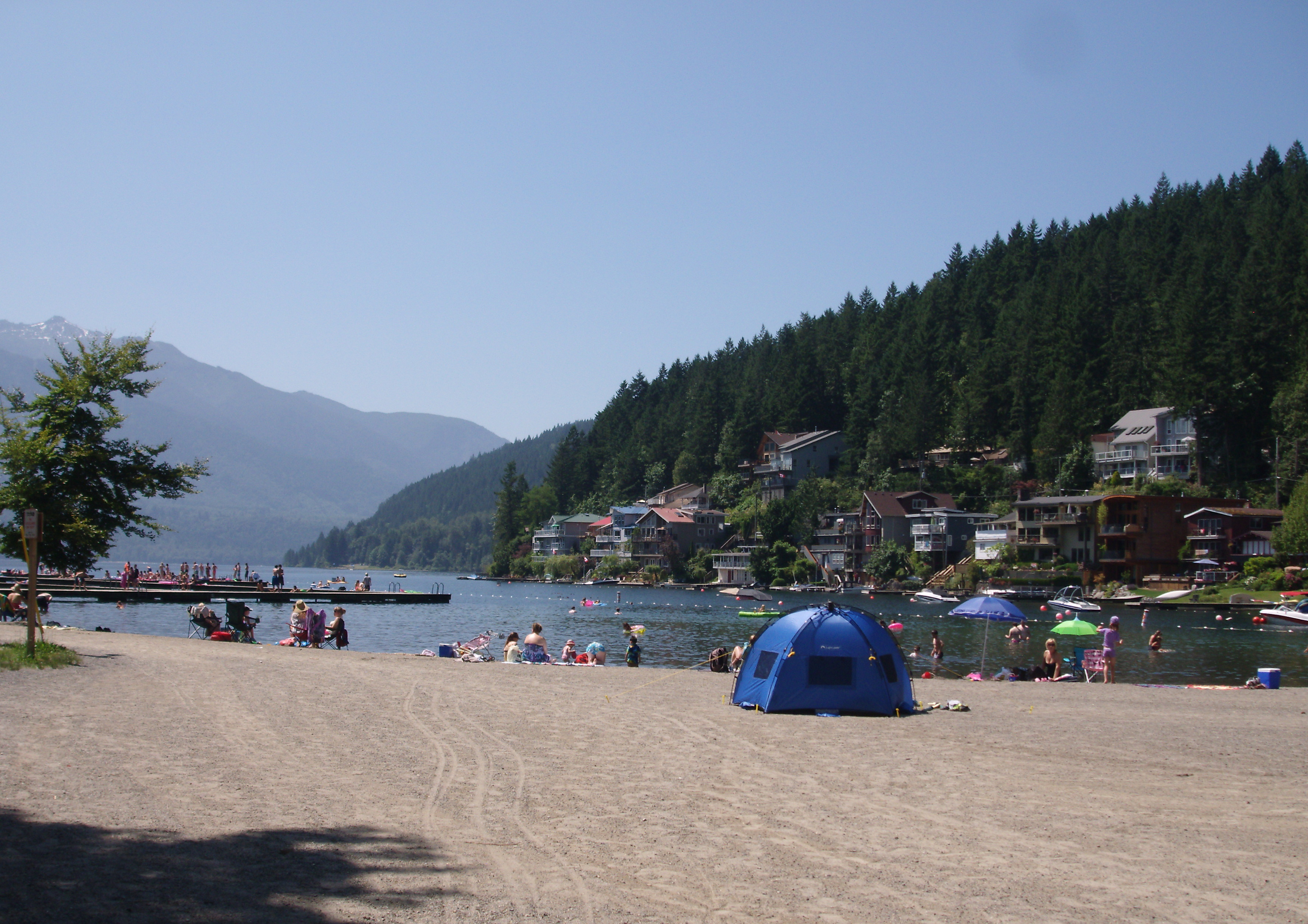
Lakeside homes on Cultus Lake

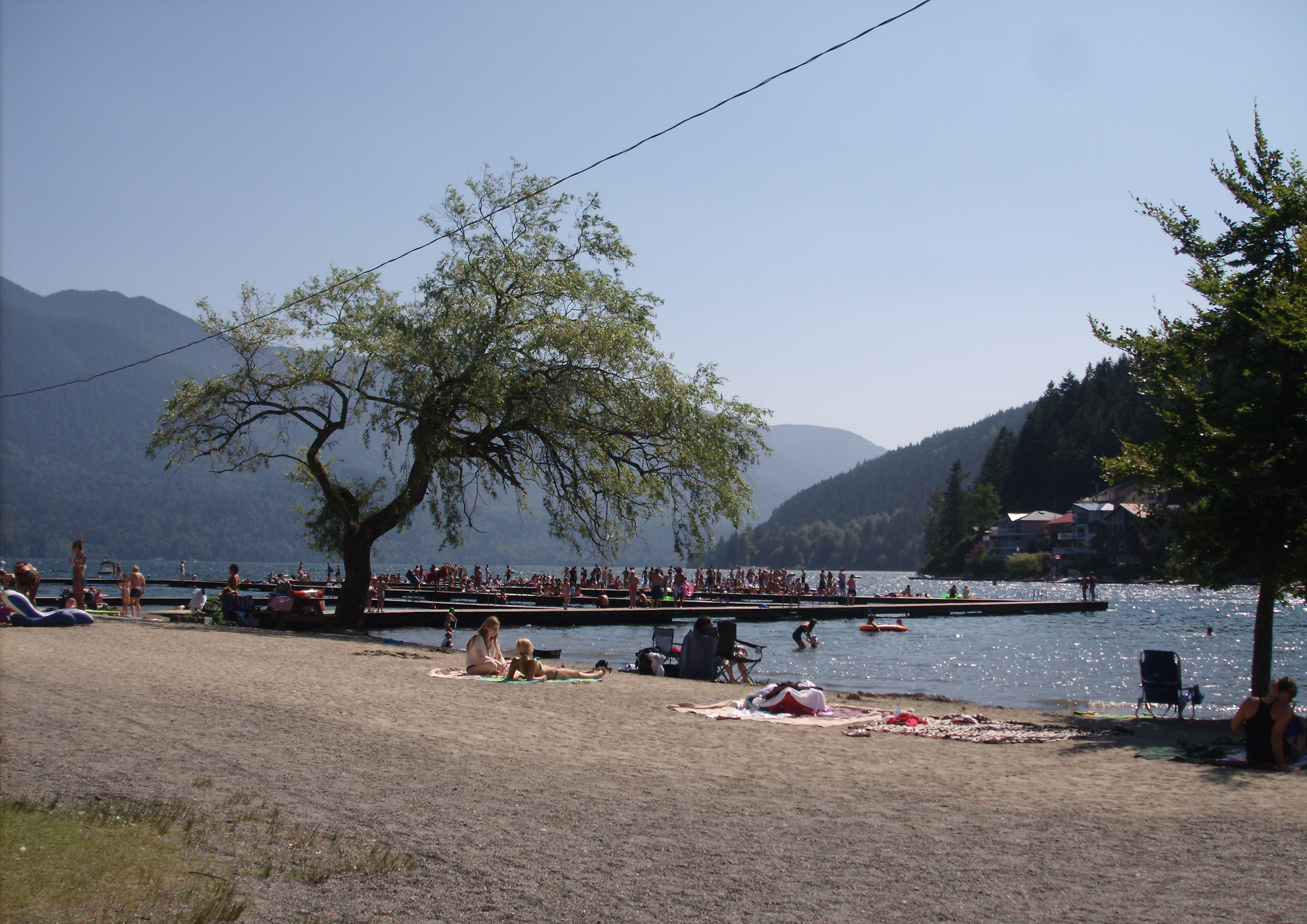
Dock on Cultus Lake

Recreation facilities include Cultus Lake Waterpark and the Cultus Lake Adventure Park, which opened in July 2014 as the expansion of Giggle Ridge Adventure Golf.

British Columbia Parks has several camping sites in the area in addition to a few privately owned campgrounds.

== Government ==
In the early 1900s, the Cultus Lake area was a popular destination, which led to the formation of a joint committee between the City of Chilliwack and the Corporation of the Township of Chilliwhack (sic) in 1924. This then led to the formation of the Cultus Lake Park Board in 1932, which is still in effect today. The Cultus Lake Park Board includes five commissioners, of whom 3 are elected from Cultus Lake, and 2 from the City of Chilliwack. As of 2022, the board chairman is Kirk Dzaman.

== Education ==
Cultus Lake Community School has approximately 150 students from Kindergarten to Grade 6. The school was first opened in 1947 as a three-room schoolhouse. It was destroyed by a fire in February 1959; the current building opened in October of the same year. The school is administered by the Chilliwack School District.
