= Washington State Route 546 =

State highway in Whatcom County, Washington, US

State Route 546

- A map of northern Whatcom County with SR 546 highlighted in red

Route information
- Auxiliary route of I-5
- Maintained by WSDOT
- Length: 8.02 mi (12.91 km)
- Existed: 1964–present

Major junctions
- West end: SR 539 near Lynden
- East end: SR 9 near Sumas

Location
- Country: United States
- State: Washington
- Counties: Whatcom

Highway system
- State highways in Washington; Interstate; US; State; Scenic; Pre-1964; 1964 renumbering; Former
← SR 544	→ SR 547

State Route 546 (SR 546) is a state highway in Whatcom County, Washington, United States. It runs east–west for 8 miles (13 km) near the Canadian border, connecting SR 539 near Lynden to SR 9 near Nooksack and Sumas. The highway is a major freight corridor and serves as an alternate route between Bellingham and the Sumas border crossing.

The highway runs along Badger Road, which was built in the 1890s and paved by the county government in 1922 per the request of citizen petitions. It was incorporated into the state highway system from 1937 to 1951 as part of Secondary State Highway 1A (SSH 1A), which connected to Blaine and Sedro-Woolley. The Lynden section was replaced with a southerly route and re-designated as a branch of SSH 1B in 1957. During the 1964 state highway renumbering, SR 546 replaced the SSH 1B branch, while the rest of the highway became SR 539. Between 2013 and 2016, the state government built a set of three roundabouts on SR 546 in northern Lynden to replace intersections that had been the site of major collisions.

== Route description ==
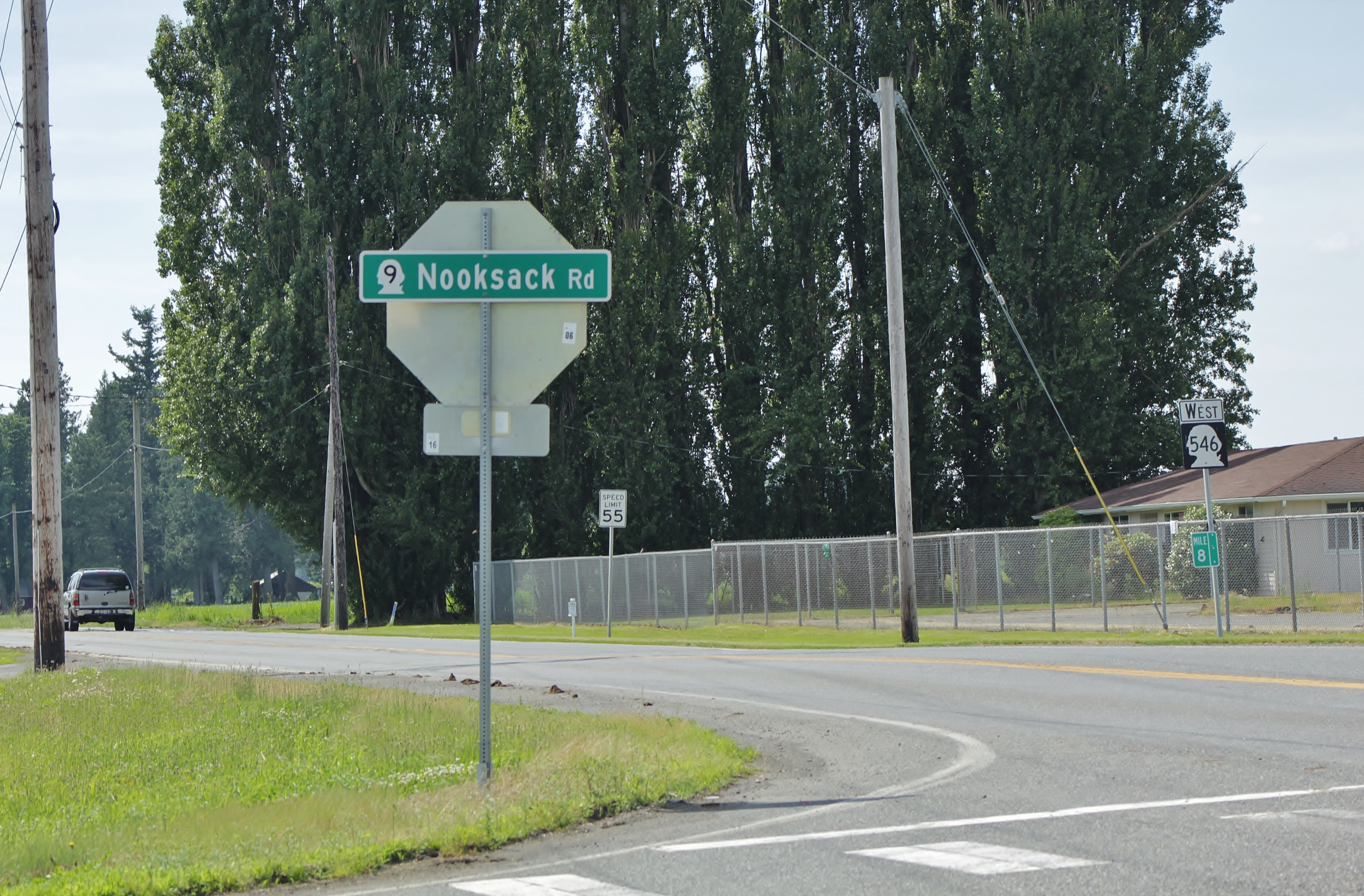
Looking westbound on SR 546 from its eastern terminus with SR 9

SR 546 begins at an intersection with SR 539 and Badger Road northwest of Lynden, located about 2.7 miles (4.3 km) south of the Canadian border. The highway travels east on Badger Road across the northern outskirts of Lynden and its residential neighborhoods, traversing a pair of roundabouts at Depot Road and Bender Road. After passing more residential areas, a small industrial park, and a third roundabout at Northwood Road, SR 546 leaves Lynden city limits and descends into the lower Nooksack Valley, a flat and rural area with views of Mount Baker. The highway passes several farms and forested plots before it crosses over a branch railroad belonging to the BNSF Railway and reaches a junction with SR 9. SR 546 terminates at the junction, located adjacent to the Nooksack Valley High School campus and approximately four miles (6.4 km) southwest of Sumas, and SR 9 continues east onto Badger Road on its way towards Sumas.

SR 546 runs through Lynden and the outlying rural areas as a two-lane highway with a posted speed limit of 50 miles per hour (80 km/h). The highway is designated as a major freight corridor and serves as an alternative route to the 24-hour Sumas border crossing from Interstate 5, which intersects SR 539 in Bellingham. SR 546 is designated as a Highway of Statewide Significance and is listed as part of the National Highway System, a network of roads identified as important to the national economy, defense, and mobility. The Washington State Department of Transportation (WSDOT) estimates that approximately 5,500 to 9,700 vehicles use the highway on a daily basis, based on annual average daily traffic data. The busiest section is located between SR 539 and Depot Road in Lynden, carrying 9,000 to 9,700 vehicles per day in 2016.

== History ==
Badger Road was once part of the Blaine–Sumas Highway, a major county road that was built in the 1890s to connect towns in northern Whatcom County, including Lynden and Van Buren. After a successful petition campaign by local residents, the county government completed paving of the highway in 1922, costing an estimated $110,000 (equivalent to $1.62 million in 2024 dollars). The road was added to the state highway system in 1937 as a section of Secondary State Highway 1A (SSH 1A). The state highway began in Blaine and traveled east to Lynden and Lawrence before turning south and running through Skagit and Snohomish counties along the foothills of the Cascade Mountains.

The terminus of SSH 1A was moved to an intersection with SSH 1B on the south side of the Nooksack River in 1951, leaving Badger Road out of the state highway system for several years. Badger Road was re-added to the highway system in 1957 as a branch of SSH 1B, which ran north–south between Bellingham and the Canadian border. During the 1964 state highway renumbering, the trunk of SSH 1B became SR 539, SSH 1A became SR 9, and the Lynden branch of SSH 1B became SR 546. The renumbering was codified by the state legislature in 1970.

In the 2000s, WSDOT began long-term planning for the SR 546 corridor, including determining replacements or retrofits for several intersections in northern Lynden that were the site of several major collisions in the early 2010s. Two roundabouts, located one-half mile (0.8 km) apart at Depot Road and Bender Road, were constructed in 2013 using $5.6 million in federal border funding. Construction of a third roundabout, located at Northwood Road, was completed in July 2016 and required road traffic to be restricted to alternating, one-way patterns. The western terminus of SR 546 is planned to be converted into a multi-lane roundabout with SR 539 in the mid-to-late 2020s as part of the state government's plans for the Guide Meridian corridor.

== Major intersections ==
The entire highway is in Whatcom County.

Location	mi	km	Destinations	Notes
Lynden	0.00	0.00	SR 539 (Guide Meridian Road) – Bellingham, Canadian Customs	Western terminus
	8.02	12.91	SR 9 – Sumas, Everson	Eastern terminus
1.000 mi = 1.609 km; 1.000 km = 0.621 mi
