= Washington State Route 544 =

State highway in Whatcom County, Washington, US

State Route 544

- A map of northern Whatcom County with SR 544 highlighted in red

Route information
- Auxiliary route of I-5
- Maintained by WSDOT
- Length: 8.94 mi (14.39 km)
- Existed: 1964–present

Major junctions
- West end: SR 539 near Lynden
- East end: SR 9 in Nooksack

Location
- Country: United States
- State: Washington
- Counties: Whatcom

Highway system
- State highways in Washington; Interstate; US; State; Scenic; Pre-1964; 1964 renumbering; Former
← SR 543	→ SR 546

State Route 544 is a state highway in northern Whatcom County, Washington, United States. It runs east–west for 9 miles (14 km) near the Canadian border, connecting SR 539 near Lynden to Everson and a junction with SR 9 in Nooksack.

The Lynden–Everson highway was built in the 1880s as a wagon road, with onward connections to Nooksack via a ferry over the Nooksack River that was later replaced with a bridge. It was paved by the Whatcom County government in the 1930s and incorporated into the state highway system in 1951 as a branch of Secondary State Highway 1A. During the 1964 state highway renumbering, the branch became SR 544. The Nooksack River bridge between Everson and Nooksack was replaced in 1994 after a major flood damaged the old structure.

== Route description ==
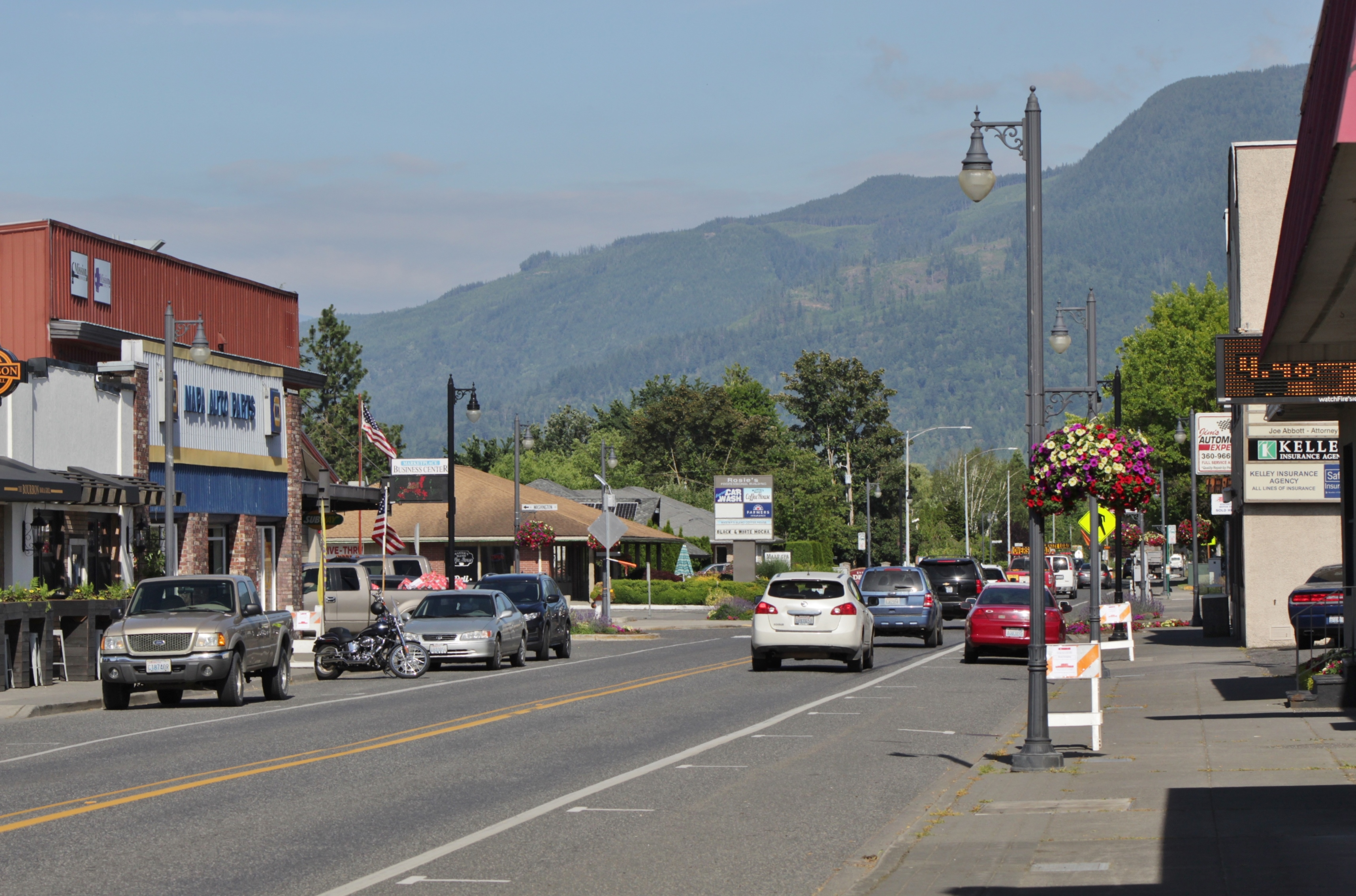
Main Street (SR 544) in Everson

SR 544 begins at a roundabout with SR 539 (the Guide Meridian) on the south side of Wiser Lake near Lynden. The highway travels east on Pole Road through farmland and passes a housing subdivision near the Raspberry Ridge Golf Course. SR 544 continues due east along Fourmile Creek and turns north at a junction with Everson Goshen Road near several gravel pits and the Nooksack Indian Reservation. After passing several industrial businesses, the highway turns northeast to enter Everson and turns north onto Mead Avenue near the city's elementary school. SR 544 then turns east once again at Kale Street and continues northeast onto Everson Road as it crosses the Nooksack River alongside a section of the Bay to Baker Trail. The highway travels east through downtown Everson on Main Street, passing several businesses, the city hall, and a branch of the Whatcom County Library System. SR 544 continues across a small patch of farmland to neighboring Nooksack, where it becomes Columbia Street and runs for several blocks on the southern outskirts of the town. SR 544 terminates at a junction with SR 9, which uses a block Columbia Street to cross over the BNSF Railway's Sumas Subdivision before continuing north towards Sumas and south towards Sedro-Woolley.

SR 544 is maintained by the Washington State Department of Transportation (WSDOT), which conducts an annual survey on state highways to measure traffic volume in terms of annual average daily traffic. Average traffic volumes on the highway in 2016 ranged from a minimum of 6,700 vehicles at the SR 539 roundabout to a maximum of 9,800 vehicles on the Nooksack River Bridge. The entire length of SR 544 is also served by Whatcom Transportation Authority bus route 71X, which connects Bellingham to Everson, Nooksack, and Sumas.

== History ==
The route from Bellingham to Everson was originally part of the Whatcom Trail, used by the indigenous Nooksack people and later prospectors during the Fraser Canyon Gold Rush in the 1850s and 1860s. The Whatcom County government ordered the construction of a permanent county road in January 1857 and construction began nine months later. By the following May, the road had been completed and was later named Telegraph Road. The Bellingham and Northern Railway was later built in the 1880s along the route from Bellingham to Everson and Sumas and included a crossing of the Nooksack River west of Everson. The Everson bridge was later joined by a road bridge that was constructed a decade later to replace a ferry on a major wagon road. The east–west road connecting Everson and Nooksack to the Guide Meridian was paved in the early 1930s by the county government.

The Everson road was designated as a branch of Secondary State Highway 1A (SSH 1A) by the state legislature in 1951. SR 544 was created during the 1964 renumbering to replace the Everson branch, while the rest of SSH 1A became SR 9. After suffering damage during a major flood in November 1990, the original truss bridge over the Nooksack River was replaced with a longer span, which opened in 1994. The entire highway was repaved by WSDOT in summer 2005, requiring the three-month closure of sections near Everson. The project cost $2.6 million to complete and was delayed by the discovery of gasoline-contaminated soil under Everson's Main Street.

== Major intersections ==
The entire route is in Whatcom County.

Location	mi	km	Destinations	Notes
	0.00	0.00	SR 539 (Guide Meridian Road) – Bellingham, Border Crossing	Roundabout
Nooksack	8.94	14.39	SR 9 – Sumas, Sedro-Woolley	
1.000 mi = 1.609 km; 1.000 km = 0.621 mi
