= Washington State Route 539 =

North–south state highway in Washington

State Route 539
- Guide Meridian
- SR 539 highlighted in red

Route information
- Auxiliary route of I-5
- Maintained by WSDOT
- Length: 15.18 mi (24.43 km)
- Existed: 1969–present

Major junctions
- South end: I-5 in Bellingham
- SR 546 near Lynden
- North end: Highway 13 at the Canadian border near Lynden

Location
- Country: United States
- State: Washington
- Counties: Whatcom

Highway system
- State highways in Washington; Interstate; US; State; Scenic; Pre-1964; 1964 renumbering; Former
← SR 538	→ SR 542

State Route 539 (SR 539, named the Guide Meridian) is a north–south state highway in the U.S. state of Washington. The highway travels through northwestern Whatcom County and connects Interstate 5 (I-5) in Bellingham with Lynden and the Canadian border near Langley, British Columbia.

The Guide Meridian, named for the guide meridian that it follows while traveling due north–south, was originally a plank road constructed in the late 1880s. It was replaced with a gravel road in the 1910s and a paved highway later that decade by the Whatcom County government. The Guide Meridian was absorbed into the state highway system and designated as Secondary State Highway 1B (SSH 1B) in 1937, which was later supplemented with the creation of U.S. Route 99 Alternate in 1952. Both designations were replaced with SR 539 in 1969 following the completion of I-5 in Bellingham.

The majority of SR 539 between Bellingham and Lynden was expanded to a four-lane highway with turn lanes over two phases in the late 2000s. The project included construction of several roundabouts and a new bridge over the Nooksack River near Lynden on an accelerated schedule to accommodate traffic ahead of the 2010 Winter Olympics in Vancouver.

== Route description ==
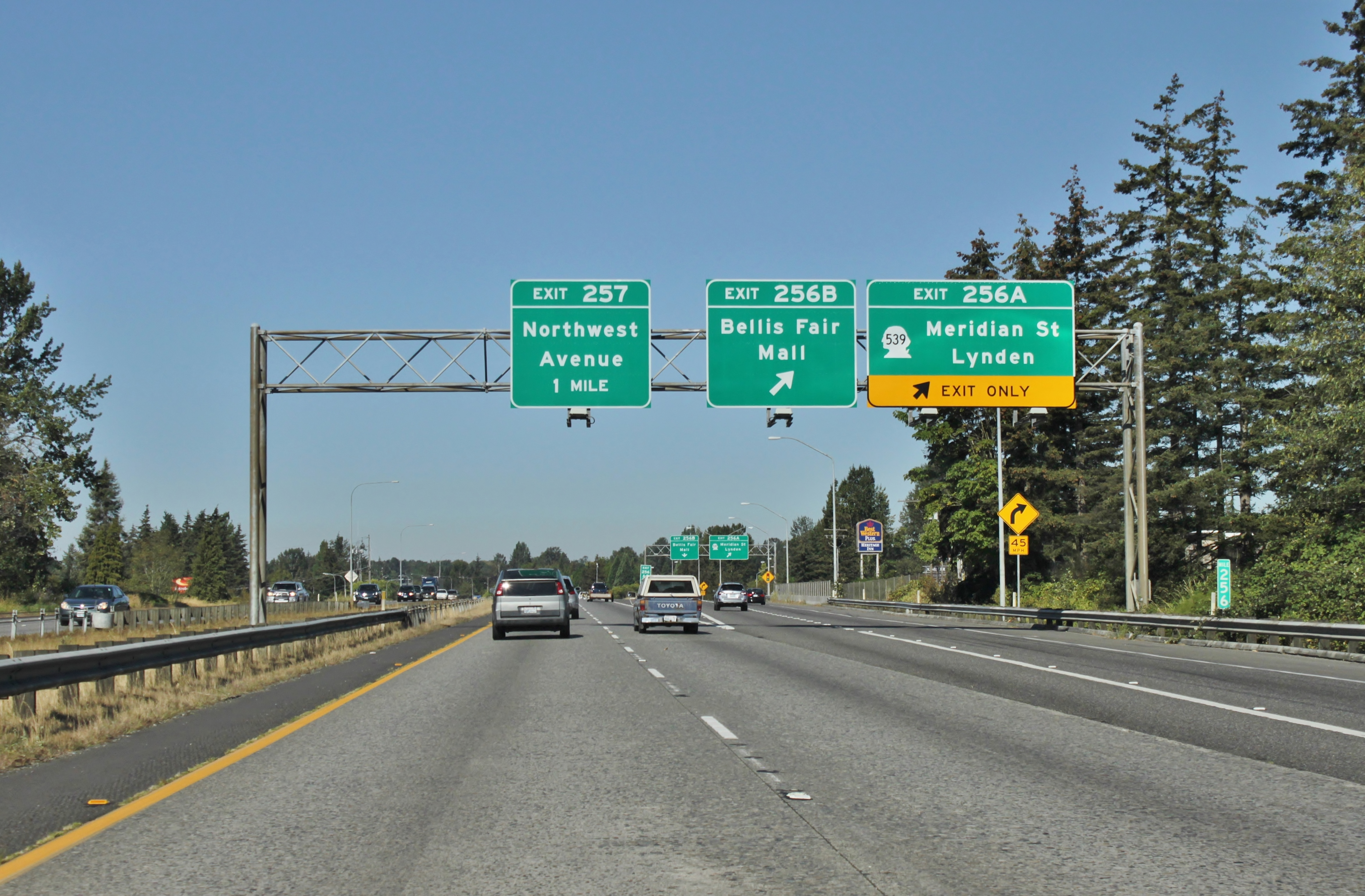
The southern terminus of SR 539, at an interchange with I-5 in Bellingham

SR 539 begins as a continuation of Meridian Street north of downtown Bellingham at an interchange with I-5 near the Bellis Fair Mall. The highway travels along the east side of the mall and through a retail and commercial district, passing near the Whatcom Community College campus and the Cordata business park. After leaving Bellingham city limits near the residential areas of the Cordata neighborhood, SR 539 becomes the Guide Meridian Road, so named because it follows the "guide meridian" plotted for surveying that runs 12 miles (19 km) east of the Willamette Meridian.

The four-lane highway continues north through the rural Laurel area and passes the campus of Meridian High School. After crossing Fourmile Creek and passing through a roundabout with Ten Mile Road, SR 539 gains a grass median with a cable barrier as it heads north towards Lynden. In the southern outskirts of the city, the highway reaches a roundabout with SR 544, which travels northeast to the towns of Everson and Nooksack. SR 539 continues north and crosses over Wiser Lake on a causeway and the Nooksack River on a pair of steel truss bridges before reaching Lynden.

The Guide Meridian travels through the western outskirts of Lynden and passes through an industrial area and near the Northwest Washington Fair and Events Center. The highway leaves Lynden and narrows to two lanes before reaching an intersection with SR 546. After traversing another stretch of farmland, SR 539 reaches the Lynden–Aldergrove Border Crossing on the Canadian border, where it terminates. The highway widens to accommodate two separate lanes for trucks and NEXUS pass-holders and is split into two roads with a duty-free store in the middle. The border crossing is open from 8 a.m. to midnight and is the fourth-busiest border crossing in the state, with 509,467 vehicles entering the United States in 2017. Beyond the border, the road becomes British Columbia Highway 13, which continues north to Aldergrove and an interchange with the Trans-Canada Highway east of Langley.

The entire route of SR 539 from Bellingham to the Canadian border is perfectly straight and runs due north–south. It serves as an alternate route between Bellingham and British Columbia, bypassing the busier Blaine border crossings. The entire highway is listed as part of the National Highway System, a national network of roads identified as important to the national economy, defense, and mobility; it is also designated as a Highway of Statewide Significance by the state legislature. SR 539 is maintained by the Washington State Department of Transportation (WSDOT), which conducts an annual survey on state highways to measure traffic volume in terms of annual average daily traffic. Average traffic volumes on the highway in 2016 ranged from a minimum of 1,400 vehicles at the Canadian border to a maximum of 37,000 vehicles near Bellis Fair Mall. The Guide Meridian corridor is also served by several Whatcom Transportation Authority bus routes connecting Bellingham to Lynden, Everson, Nooksack, and Sumas.

== History ==
=== Early roads ===
The Guide Meridian was preceded by a plank road that was built by the Whatcom County government in stages between 1884 and 1885 and fully graded in 1890. By November 1891, it stretched 12 miles (19 km) and cost an estimated $6,000 per mile to construct. It was destroyed several times by forest fires, including a major fire in 1897 that required using 80,000 board feet of lumber to replace the burned sections.

The Guide Meridian was later reconstructed as a gravel road from Bellingham to the Canadian border in the early 1910s and maintained by a local citizen named John C. Anderson, who received praise from local newspapers for the quality of the road. The section of the Guide Meridian within Bellingham city limits, named Meridian Street, was paved by the city government in 1914. The following year, the county government began a $68,800 improvement program, which included a new bridge over the Nooksack River near Lynden and 5 miles (8.0 km) of pavement between Bellingham and Laurel. The paved Guide Meridian was opened on September 14, 1915, ahead of the Northwest Washington Fair, and the new Nooksack River bridge was completed the following month. The new bridge measured 383 feet 3 inches (116.81 m) in length, the longest of any steel bridge in the Pacific Northwest at the time.

The planked approaches to the Nooksack River bridge were deemed too narrow for automobile traffic and widened by 8 feet (2.4 m) in 1919. Further paving projects on sections of the Guide Meridian were contracted by the county government between 1920 and 1932, completing a paved highway from Bellingham to the Canadian border. The British Columbia government announced plans in 1931 to link the improved Guide Meridian to the Fraser Highway via a new paved highway.

=== State and national highway ===
U.S. Route 99 Alternate
- Location: Bellingham–Canadian border
- Existed: 1952–1969

The Guide Meridian was added to the state highway system in 1937 as Secondary State Highway 1B (SSH 1B), connecting the Canadian border with Primary State Highway 1 (PSH 1), also signed as U.S. Route 99 (US 99) in Bellingham. Several bills in the 1930s proposed elevating the Guide Meridian to a primary state highway, but they were not advanced by the state legislature. In 1951, the Nooksack River bridge near Lynden was disassembled and moved 30 miles (48 km) upstream to Mosquito Lake Road as part of a widening project on the Guide Meridian.

In 1952, the American Association of State Highway Officials approved the creation of US 99 Alternate, which would run concurrent to SSH 1B from Bellingham to the Canadian border. The designation came shortly before the completion of the Aldergrove highway (signed as British Columbia Highway 13).

After the completion of the Bellingham Freeway (part of I-5) in December 1960, SSH 1B was truncated to a new interchange at the north end of Meridian Street. During the 1964 state highway renumbering, SSH 1B was replaced by US 99 Alternate and PSH 1 was provisionally renumbered to US 99 before being replaced outright by I-5. US 99 and its alternate routes were decommissioned in 1969, leaving SR 539 to replace SSH 1B when the new state highway system was codified by the state legislature in 1970.

=== Modern widening ===
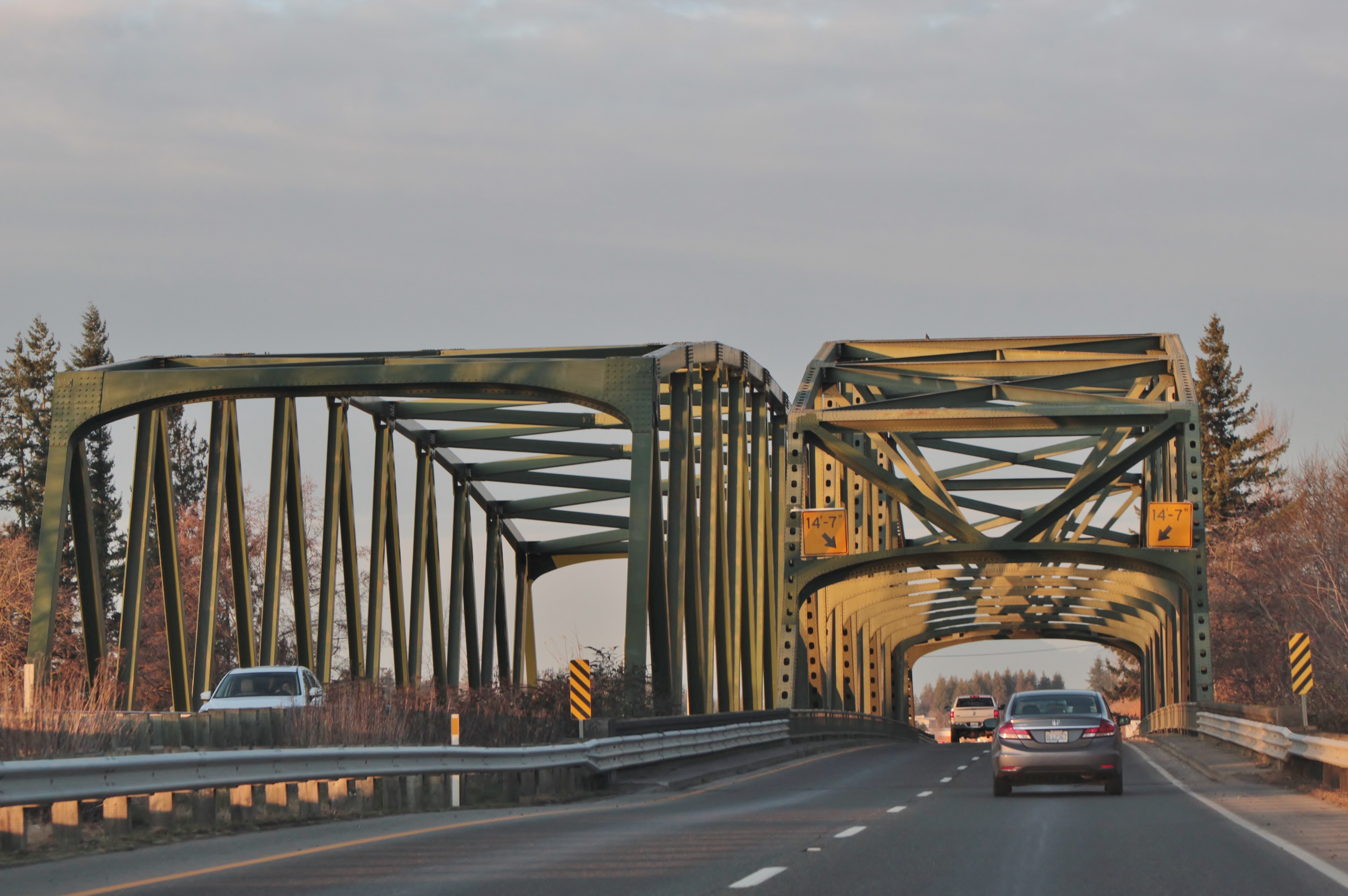
SR 539 crosses the Nooksack River on a pair of truss bridges; the southbound (left) span was constructed in 2009.

The state government began planning a major expansion of SR 539 to a four-lane highway in the late 1980s to accommodate local population growth and increased cross-border freight traffic. The corridor had been studied for widening in 1970 due to a high rate of fatalities compared to other rural highways in the state, but the projected traffic volumes did not justify expansion at the time. In 1979, the state government funded a $1.4 million project to widen the southernmost section of SR 539 to four lanes with a turn lane between I-5 and Kellogg Road.

The highway was later identified as among the state's most dangerous, with 714 collisions and nine deaths from 1988 to 1993 and 314 collisions and three deaths from 1999 to 2003. The first major phase of the project, covering 4.62 miles (7.44 km) between Horton Road in Bellingham to Ten Mile Road near Laurel, was approved for design work in 1999.

Construction of the first phase was originally planned to begin in 2003, but funding issues and negotiations with property owners for expanded right-of-way slowed progress. The project began construction in June 2007 after it was allocated additional funding from the state legislature's transportation package. The widened, four-lane roadway with center turn lanes was completed in November 2008, including new traffic signals at three intersections, several detention ponds, and two bridge replacements, at a total cost of $66.3 million.

The second phase, covering 6.54 miles (10.53 km) of SR 539 between Ten Mile Road and Badger Road (SR 546) in Lynden at a cost of $89.2 million, was included in the 2003 Nickel Funding Package passed by the state legislature. It was originally scheduled to be completed in 2013, but a supplemental legislative package approved in 2004 advanced $60.4 million in funding for the project so it would be completed in time for the 2010 Winter Olympics to be held in nearby Vancouver. While several alternative options were considered for the SR 539 corridor, including carpool lanes and improving parallel roads, WSDOT chose to largely re-use the four-lane roadway configuration with turn lanes already planned for the first phase. The section would, however, include five roundabouts at existing intersections to improve safety and prevent long backups at signals near Lynden.

The project was later scaled back to remove the roundabout at Badger Road and the widened roadway beyond southern Lynden due to a projected increase in land and construction costs. Construction of the second phase began in March 2008 under a $54 million contract awarded by WSDOT that included a new bridge over the Nooksack River and widening of four other bridges. The new Nooksack River span, a 300-foot (91 m) steel truss bridge carrying two lanes of southbound traffic, began construction in April 2009. To avoid placing piers in the river, each half of the bridge was built from the shore and joined together in September. It was the first truss bridge to be built in Washington state since the completion of a span over the Snake River on U.S. Route 12 east of Pasco in 1986. The bridge opened to traffic on February 9, 2010, days before the opening ceremonies of the 2010 Winter Olympics.

The first roundabout on SR 539, located at Ten Mile Road, began construction in March 2009 and opened on May 16, 2009, after several delays due to rainy weather. A second roundabout was opened at Pole Road (SR 544) on August 17, ahead of the Northwest Washington Fair, and was followed by a third at Wiser Lake Road in October. The final roundabout was opened on December 7 at River Road on the north side of the Nooksack River bridge. Construction on the second phase was completed in July 2010 with the installation of cable median barriers to prevent head-on and crossover collisions. Since the installation of roundabouts and cable median barriers, collisions on SR 539 have increased but injuries have declined from 96 between 2000 and 2010 to 23 between 2010 and 2018. Plans to widen the remainder of the highway to the Canadian border were adopted by the county government in 2013, but remain unfunded.

== Major intersections ==
The entire highway is in Whatcom County.

Location	mi	km	Destinations	Notes
Bellingham	0.00	0.00	I-5 – Seattle, Vancouver BC	Interchange
	7.51	12.09	SR 544 east (Pole Road) – Everson, Nooksack	Roundabout
	12.54	20.18	SR 546 east (Badger Road) – Sumas	
Canada–United States border	15.18	24.43	Highway 13 at Lynden–Aldergrove Border Crossing	
1.000 mi = 1.609 km; 1.000 km = 0.621 mi: Route transition
