= Nooksack Valley School District =

School district in Whatcom County, Washington

The Nooksack Valley School District in Whatcom County, Washington, U.S. is a school district named after the Nooksack River. It has five schools and some 1,870 students as of 2006. The district includes one high school, one middle school, and three elementary schools.

The district boundary includes Everson, Nooksack, and Sumas.

== High school ==
Nooksack Valley High School is located just north of Nooksack at the junction of State Route 9 and State Route 546. Nooksack Valley High School (NVHS) enrolls students in ninth through twelfth grades. Upon successful completion of the twelfth grade, students graduate and may participate in a graduation ceremony. Students must complete required courses and pass the tenth grade Washington Assessment of Student Learning (WASL) tests to graduate. Core classes focus on English literature and composition, math, science, and social sciences. Classes are also offered in art, health, music, physical education, technology, world languages, and vocational education. College preparatory and Advanced Placement courses are available. Academically qualified students may take college courses at Whatcom Community College or Bellingham Technical College through the Running Start program. Extracurricular offerings include clubs, social activities, competitions, and sports. NVHS competes in numerous sports through the Washington Interscholastic Activities Association (WIAA). NVHS is a WIAA Division A (single A) school.

== Middle school ==
Nooksack Valley Middle School is located on State Route 544 (W. Columbia Street) in Nooksack. The school opened as a middle school in 1998 after conversion from an elementary school. As a middle school, it enrolls students in sixth through eighth grades. Classes focus on English literature and composition, math, science, and social sciences. Additional courses include music, fine arts, health, and physical education. Extracurricular offerings include field trips, social events, academic competitions, and sports.

== Elementary schools ==
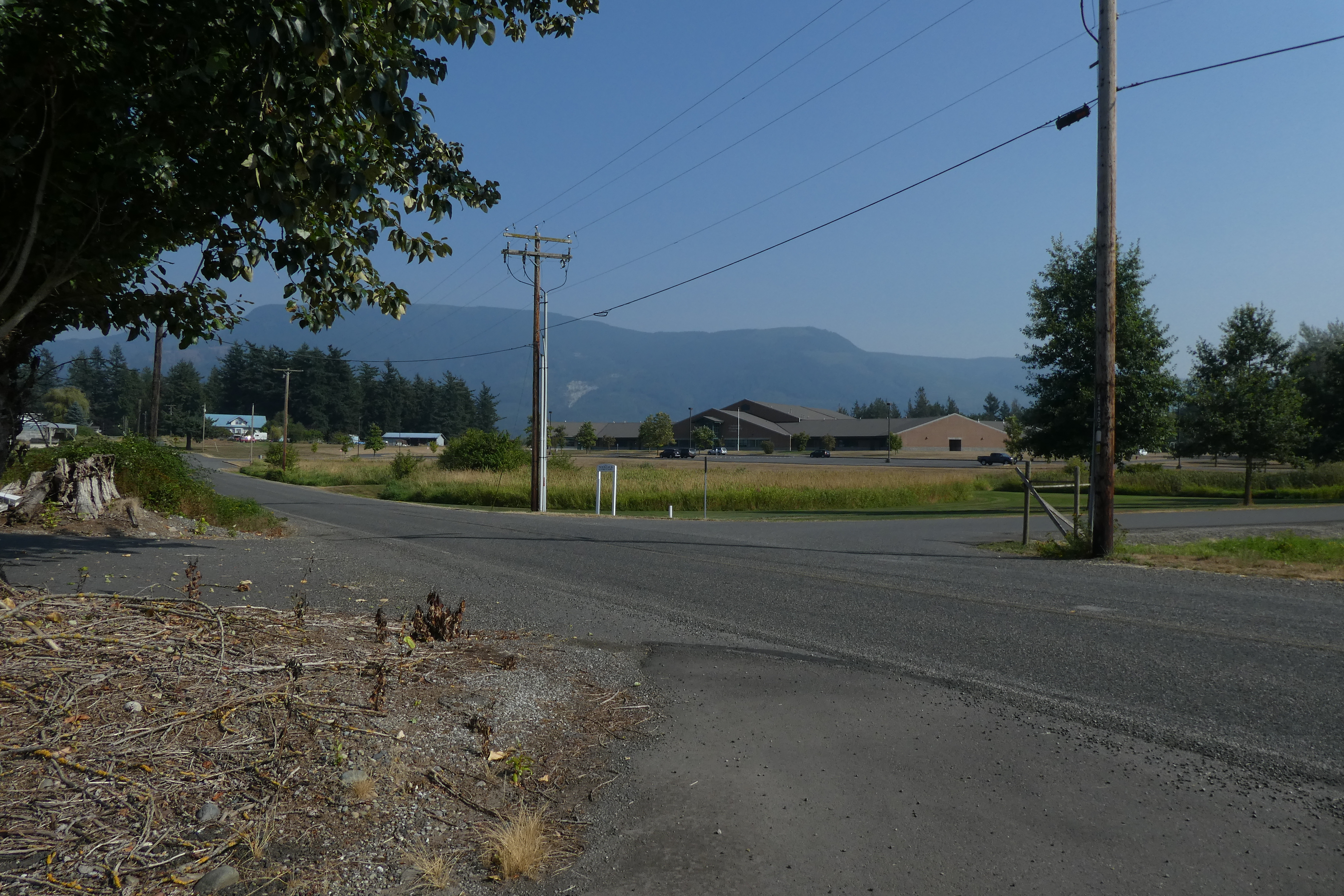
Nooksack Elementary School in 2017

Everson Elementary School is located on State Route 544 (Everson-Goshen Road) in Everson. Everson Elementary opened in 1993. The school enrolls students in kindergarten through fifth grade. It also offers a preschool as part of the Head Start program. Breakfast and lunch are served daily.

Nooksack Elementary School is located on Breckenridge Road in Nooksack. Breckenridge Creek borders this school campus. Nooksack Elementary opened in 1998. The school enrolls students in kindergarten through fifth Grade. A preschool is available for eligible children; it is part of the Head Start program. Breakfast and lunch are served daily.

Sumas Elementary School is located on Lawson Street in Sumas. The school opened in 1975 and currently enrolls students in kindergarten through fifth grade. The school has early childhood programs for birth to age three and preschool. The birth to three program serves children with disabilities and children eligible for Early Head Start. The preschool provides Head Start services to eligible children. Breakfast and lunch are served daily.
