= Big Lake (Washington) =

- Interactive map of Big Lake
- Coordinates: 48.3815°N 122.2299°W
- Part of: Skagit River system
- Primary inflows: Lake Creek
- Primary outflows: Nookachamps Creek
- Catchment area: 19.8 sq mi (51 km^{2})
- Surface area: 540 acres (2.2 km^{2})
- Average depth: 14 ft (4.3 m)
- Max. depth: 23 feet (7.0 m)
- Settlements: Big Lake, Montborne

Big Lake is located in southwestern Skagit County, Washington. It is drained to the north by Nookachamps Creek, part of the Skagit River system, while Lake Creek to the south serves as its main tributary. Although various Potamogeton (pondweed) species are present, invasive aquatic plants and cyanobacteria blooms have posed risks to the lake's water quality and wildlife. Euro-American settlers came to the region during the 1880s, with the communities of Montborne and Big Lake serving as logging towns until the 1920s. The watershed is now mainly forested, with rural residential areas around the lake's shoreline.

== Hydrology ==
Ducks swimming on Big Lake

Big Lake measures 540 acres (2.2 km^{2}) in area, draining a heavily forested 19.8-square-mile (51 km^{2}) watershed in unincorporated portions of southwestern Skagit County, Washington, southeast of the city of Mount Vernon. Big Lake is relatively shallow, with a mean depth of 14 feet (4.3 m), and a maximum depth of 23 feet (7.0 m). It averages about 0.25 to 0.50 miles (0.4 to 0.8 km) in width, with an approximate shoreline of 6.4 miles (10.3 km).

Lake Creek is the main tributary stream, which emerges from Lake McMurray and flows north for about 10.9 miles (17.5 km) into the southern end of Big Lake. Several other small, unnamed tributary streams drain into Big Lake, two of which measure over a mile in length. The largest of these flows through an area of wetlands before draining into the west-central portion of the lake. Nookachamps Creek serves as the outlet, flowing north into the smaller Barney Lake before meeting the lower Skagit River, which ultimately drains into the Puget Sound.

The watershed averages about 48 inches (120 cm) of precipitation per year, with slightly higher precipitation in the southern portions. Precipitation is highest in November and December, and lowest in August, with about 65% of annual rainfall between October and March. Average daily low temperatures reach around 32 °F (0 °C) during January, the coldest period of the year.

The elevation of the Big Lake watershed ranges from 86 feet (26 m) above sea level at the lake's outlet to Nookachamps Creek, to 1,700 feet (520 m) above sea level along the rim of Devils Mountain at the basin's western edge. The geology of the surrounding region is dominated by glacial till, with a formation of glacial outwash deposits around the northern end of the lake. Wetlands are present at the southern end of the lake, as well as in scattered portions in the southern half of the watershed.

== Biology ==
Various Potamogeton (pondweed) species are present in the lake. Dolly Varden trout and bull trout may spawn in the Big Lake watershed, although Chinook salmon are only found in the lower portions of the Nookachamps system.

By the 1990s, the invasive aquatic plants Myriophyllum spicatum (Eurasian watermilfoil) and especially Elodea densa (Brazilian waterweed) spread through Big Lake. Concerned locals formed the Big Lake Management District to counter the invasive plants, and partnered with the Skagit County government to seek grants from the Washington State Department of Ecology's Aquatic Weed Program. The Department of Ecology treated the lake with the pesticide Sonar, killing or damaging the majority of the Brazilian waterweed and Eurasian watermilfoil in the lake. Surveys in 2025 found no Eurasian watermilfoil or Brazilian waterweed present in the lake. However, the invasive Nymphaea odorata (white waterlily), a state-designated noxious weed, was found in small patches. By 2025, cyanobacteria blooms have begun to occur in the lake during the summer and fall, posing a potential risk to wildlife.

== Human history ==
A train at Montborne, Washington, with Big Lake visible in the background, c. 1890

The Puget Sound region, including the Skagit River basin, was traditionally inhabited by the Coast Salish peoples. Euro-American settlement around Big Lake began in the late 1800s. In 1884, the physician Hyacinthe P. Montborne settled on the eastern end of the lake, platting the settlement of Montborne there in 1889. A post office and Seattle, Lake Shore and Eastern Railway station were established at the site in 1889, and the town existed as a logging community until the 1920s, before transitioning into a residential community. Further north, the Day Lumber Company founded the community of Big Lake, Washington, as a company town, operating in the area from the early 1900s until 1926.

The Department of Ecology acquired water rights around Big Lake in 2013 in order to create a water bank, intended as a mitigation measure for residents and consumers during periods of low flow in the Skagit River. In 2016, 69 acres (28 ha) of wetland at the southern end of the lake were acquired by the Skagit Land Trust to maintain as a wildlife conservation area.

=== Modern land use ===
By the 2000s, land use in the Big Lake watershed continued to be dominated by forestland. Much of the lake's shoreline is designated as rural residential areas. As of 2006, about 113 acres (46 ha) of impervious terrain was present in the watershed, about 1% of the total area. The Washington State Route 9 highway runs along the eastern shore of Big Lake before crossing Nookachamps Creek and the Skagit River.
