= Meridian Street =

Meridian Street is the name of a street in several cities and towns, including:

- Meridian Street (Indianapolis), Indiana
- Washington State Route 539, Meridian Street in Bellingham, Washington
