= Nooksack Valley High School =

Rural high school in Nooksack, Washington

Coordinates: 48°57′51″N 122°18′27″W

- 3326 East Badger Road; Everson, WA 98247; USA

Information
- Type: Public
- Motto: Home of the Pioneers
- School district: Nooksack Valley S.D.
- School number: (360) 988-2641
- Principal: Collin Buckley
- Grades: 9-12
- Enrollment: 520 (2024-2025)
- Colors: White and purple
- Mascot: Pioneer

Nooksack Valley High School is a four-year public secondary school located in rural Whatcom County, just north of Nooksack. It is located just north of Nooksack, Washington, on E. Badger Road at the junction of State Route 9 and State Route 546. The school mascot is a Pioneer and the school colors are purple and white.

The district boundary (and therefore, the high school's attendance zone) includes Everson, Nooksack, and Sumas.

== Athletics ==
Nooksack Valley fields seventeen different sports teams.

- Fall Sports: Cross Country, Football, Girls Soccer, Volleyball
- Winter Sports: Basketball, Dance & Drill, Wrestling
- Spring Sports: Baseball, Boys Soccer, Golf, Softball, Track & Field

=== State Championships ===
The Pioneers have won ten state championships.

- Volleyball: 1984 (1A), 1985 (1A), 1986 (1A)
- Boys Basketball: 1974 (1A), 2003 (2A)
- Girls Basketball: 2023 (1A), 2024 (1A)
- Boys Cross Country: 2009 (1A)
- Girls Golf: 2005 (2A)
- Softball: 2022 (1A)

== Notable alumni ==
- Casey Bauman - NFL quarterback for the Los Angeles Chargers
- Joe Cipriano - college basketball head coach, University of Idaho and Nebraska; led Washington to 1953 Final Four as a player; class of 1949
- Tom Ackerman - center, New Orleans Saints (1996-2001), Tennessee Titans (2002-2003)
- T. J. Ackerman - tackle, Toronto Argonauts
