= T.J. Ackerman =

American gridiron football player (born 1975)

Profile
- Position: Offensive tackle

Personal information
- Born: August 20, 1975 (age 51); Bellingham, Washington, U.S.
- Listed height: 6 ft 6 in (1.98 m)
- Listed weight: 315 lb (143 kg)

Career information
- High school: Nooksack Valley HS
- College: Eastern Washington

Career history
- 1999: Toronto Argonauts

Travis James Ackerman (born August 20, 1975) is an American former professional football offensive tackle. Ackerman played in five games for the Toronto Argonauts of the Canadian Football League over the 1999 season, and is the younger brother of former National Football League offensive lineman Tom Ackerman.

== Early life ==
Ackerman was a three-year varsity starter on both the offensive and defensive line before graduating from Nooksack Valley High School in 1994. After his senior season he was named Whatcom County League Offensive Player of the Year, and was also named AP All-State 1st Team on both sides of the ball. He also was a four-year letter winner in basketball as a center.

== Personal life ==
Ackerman is currently a real estate agent as well as the offensive coordinator for the Nooksack Valley Pioneers football team, and has been an assistant coach since 2000.
