= Washington State Route 9 =

North-south state highway in Washington, US

State Route 9
- SR 9 highlighted in red

Route information
- Maintained by WSDOT
- Length: 98.17 mi (157.99 km)
- Existed: 1964–present

Major junctions
- South end: SR 522 near Woodinville
- SR 524 near Maltby; US 2 near Snohomish; SR 530 in Arlington; SR 20 in Sedro-Woolley; SR 542 in Deming
- North end: Highway 11 at the Canadian border in Sumas

Location
- Country: United States
- State: Washington
- Counties: Snohomish, Skagit, Whatcom

Highway system
- State highways in Washington; Interstate; US; State; Scenic; Pre-1964; 1964 renumbering; Former
← SR 8	→ SR 10

State Route 9 (SR 9) is a 98.17-mile (157.99 km) long state highway traversing three counties, Snohomish, Skagit, and Whatcom, in the U.S. state of Washington. The highway extends north from an interchange with SR 522 north of Woodinville north through Snohomish, Lake Stevens, Arlington, Sedro-Woolley, and Nooksack to become British Columbia Highway 11 (BC 11) at the Canada–US border in Sumas. Three other roadways are briefly concurrent with the route: SR 530 in Arlington, SR 20 in Sedro-Woolley, and SR 542 near Deming. A spur route in Sumas serves trucks traveling into British Columbia.

Before SR 9 was created, several other roads used parts of the route of the current highway. The current SR 542 concurrency was first established in 1925, when a branch of State Road 1 from Bellingham to Mount Baker was added to the state highway system. These roads were combined and several other roads were added to create Secondary State Highway 1A (SSH 1A), which originally ran from Woodinville to Blaine in 1937. A branch of SSH 1A connected the mainline to the Canada–US border in Sumas, but was later included into SSH 1A when the Blaine to Sumas segment was deleted in 1953. A highway renumbering in 1964 introduced the sign routes that would be co-signed with the existing system until 1970, one of which would replace SSH 1A, SR 9. SSH 1A / SR 9 extended south to Woodinville until 1965, when it was shortened to SR 202, later SR 522, which wasn't complete yet. SR 9 was not complete between Lake Stevens and Arlington until after 1966.

Between 2004 and 2009, nine complete construction projects, arranged by the Washington State Department of Transportation (WSDOT), have improved the roadway. The projects ranged from expanding the current weigh station at the Soper Hill Road intersection in 2005 to realigning the highway between Nooksack and Sumas in 2006 to eliminate 90-degree turns. WSDOT is also widening SR 9 in Snohomish County from 2 lanes to a four-lane divided highway. Between 2009 and 2013, WSDOT plans to complete six other projects in Snohomish County to improve the corridor from SR 522 to Bryant. Some projects include widenings, adding a roundabout at SR 531, realignments south of Snohomish and the addition of web cameras.

== Route description ==
SR 9 begins less than one mile (1.6 km) north of the King–Snohomish county line near Woodinville at a partial cloverleaf interchange with SR 522. The roadway continues south as Woodinville–Snohomish Road, while SR 522 connects the area to Seattle, Bothell, and Monroe. SR 9 travels north along the west side of the Brightwater sewage treatment plant and a community park in Maltby. The four-lane highway continues north and intersects SR 524 at Turners Corner before turning northeast towards Clearview and Cathcart. SR 9 travels along the eastern ridge that overlooks the Snohomish River valley and has several sections with median barriers to form a divided highway.

Shortly after passing Cathcart, SR 96 terminates at the road. SR 9 passes Harvey Airfield and crosses another BNSF rail line and the Snohomish River to enter Snohomish. North of the Snohomish River Bridge, the highway encounters a diamond interchange with 2nd Street and Riverview Road and turns northeast to intersect Bickford Avenue, which once was U.S. Route 2 (US 2). Curving north out of Snohomish, the route interchanges with US 2 in a modified diamond interchange, with a westbound US 2 offramp routed onto New Bunk Foss Road.

In suburban West Lake Stevens near the Lake Stevens shoreline, SR 204 ends at the highway. After the intersection, the roadway had an estimated daily average of 25,000 motorists in 2007, making this stretch of road the busiest on the whole highway. SR 9 also forms the western boundary of Lake Stevens and the eastern boundary of Marysville while passing a weigh station and the SR 92 junction. After Lake Cassidy, the road intersects SR 528 and continues into North Marysville, where the roadway passes over the Snohomish County Centennial Trail. After intersecting SR 531 at a roundabout, and several residential subdivisions near the Arlington High School, the highway enters downtown Arlington as Hazel Street. After a brief concurrency with SR 530, SR 9 crosses the Stillaguamish River and passes Bryant to enter a heavily forested area and leave Snohomish County.

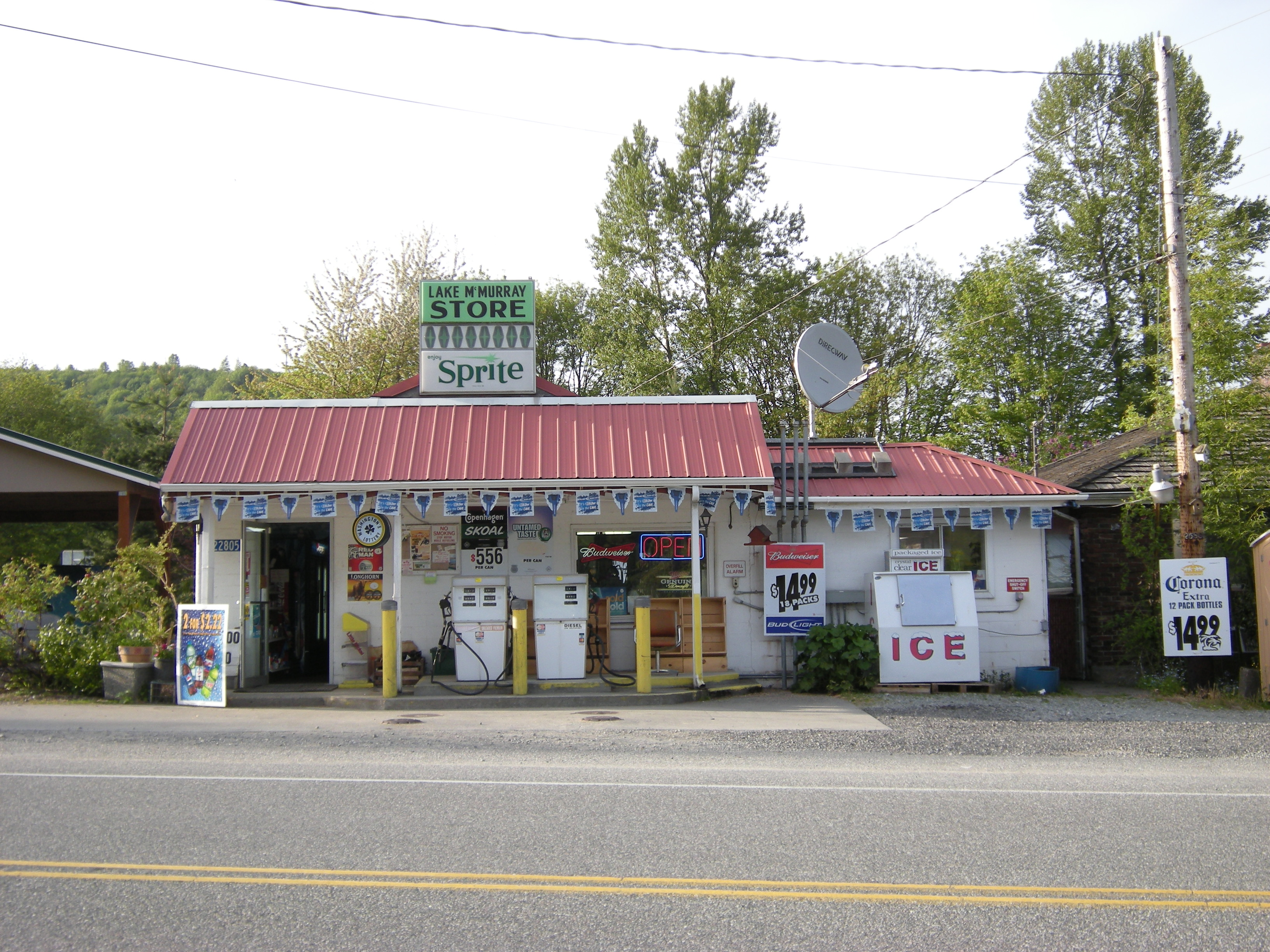
The Lake McMurray Store, established in 1889, located on SR 9 in Lake McMurray, a community located in southern Skagit County.

Entering Skagit County, the highway continues northwest through a large forest to Lake McMurray, where it intersects SR 534 and encounters the Lake McMurray Store, established in 1889. The road passes through Big Lake and its community of the same name before intersecting SR 538 at a roundabout east of Mount Vernon. Turning northeast to Clear Lake, the route crosses the Skagit River into Sedro-Woolley. In Sedro-Woolley, the street becomes concurrent with SR 20 and is named Moore Street. At the end of the concurrency, the road turns north as Township Street, paralleling another BNSF rail line, at Cascade Middle School. Continuing north out of the city and into rural areas, SR 9 crosses the Samish River and exits Skagit County.

The highway enters Whatcom County in a valley located east of Lake Whatcom. Passing Acme and crossing the Nooksack River, the roadway becomes concurrent with SR 542 at a roundabout in Deming. Traveling west with SR 542 along the Nooksack River, the road splits at another roundabout in Cedarville and continues north through a series of 90-degree turns in a plain located near the Sumas River. In Nooksack, the route becomes Nooksack Avenue and encounters SR 544, named Main Street, which travels west to Everson. North of Nooksack, SR 9 intersects SR 546 in a rural area and travels northeast along the Sumas River to Sumas. In Sumas, SR 547 ends at SR 9 and a spur route that serves trucks branches off and SR 9 terminates at the Canada–US border. The road continues north from the Canada–US border, through Abbotsford, BC to Highway 1 (BC 1), as BC 11.

=== Spur route ===
State Route 9 Spur
- Location: Sumas
- Length: 0.24 mi (390 m)

Within Sumas, SR 9 has a short 0.24 mi (0.39 km) spur route that is used by trucks travelling into Canada. SR 9 Spur starts at SR 9 (Cherry Street) and travels east as Garfield Street and north as Sumas Avenue to the Canada–US border, where it becomes Boundary Avenue and reconnects back to SR 9's continuation in Canada, Highway 11 (BC 11) in Abbotsford, BC. After the Cherry Street intersection, an estimated daily average of 1,800 motorists used the roadway in 2007.

== History ==
A 1895 maps shows about 4 miles of road on the current route of SR 9. This early road extended north from Woodinville and ran along Little Bear Creek. The Snohomish to Arlington segment was not built until after SR 9, but between Arlington and Sedro-Woolley, some roads existed by 1911 alongside a spur of the Northern Pacific Railway. The first section of the roadway to be included in the state highway system was the current SR 542 concurrency, which became a branch of State Road 1 extending from Bellingham to Mount Baker in 1925. Secondary State Highway 1A (SSH 1A) was established in 1937 and ran from Primary State Highway 2 (PSH 2) in Woodinville north to Sumas and west to PSH 1 in Blaine. A branch of SSH 1A connected the main highway to the Canada–US border. Much of the highway was not complete at the time, leading to calls from the Associated Clubs of the North End to accelerate construction to provide an alternate connection to Canada.

Between Lynden and Nooksack, SSH 1A was realigned in 1951 and in 1953, SSH 1A between Blaine and Sumas was deleted. The corridor was also incorporated into the East Pacific Highway, a designation created in 1951 as an alternative route to US 99 between Tenino and the Canadian border at Sumas. Plans to build a full limited-access highway on the corridor as originally proposed were later dropped by the state government. A five-mile (8.0 km) section between Snohomish and Lake Stevens was moved to a new, straightened roadway that opened on September 12, 1952. The Lake Stevens–Arlington section of SSH 1A was opened in late 1959, bypassing Jordan Road and the Granite Falls area. SSH 1E became concurrent with SSH 1A in 1957 when it was extended east through Arlington to Darrington. A third concurrency was added in 1961 when PSH 16 was extended west, concurrent in Sedro-Woolley, to Fredonia.

During the 1964 highway renumbering, a new system of highways, sign routes, was introduced and was co-signed with the existing primary and secondary state highways. SSH 1A became SR 9, but SSH 1A was still signed until 1970. In 1965, SSH 1A / SR 9 was shortened from Woodinville to SR 202 in Grace, which was not complete yet. A plan to truncate SSH 1A to Maltby and build a new highway from Snohomish was proposed in the 1950s but later abandoned. In 1970, SR 202 became SR 522.

Since 2004, the Washington State Department of Transportation (WSDOT) has completed nine construction projects on SR 9. The Lake Stevens weigh station, located on the west side of the highway at the Sopher Hill Road intersection was expanded to serve two trucks at once in late 2005. The U.S. Route 2 (US 2) interchange was modified to use New Bunk Foss Road as an onramp and traffic signals were added in January 2006. The roadway was repaved between Snohomish and Lake Stevens and also guardrails and turn lanes were added in 2006.< On November 22, 2006, WSDOT opened a new alignment of SR 9 between Nooksack to Sumas that bypassed three 90-degree turns. A roundabout was added to the SR 538 intersection east of Mount Vernon in summer 2007. Between SR 522 and SR 524, the highway was widened from a 2-lane road to a four-lane divided highway in 2008. A curve on the roadway north of Arlington was straightened in late 2008 and turn lanes were added to two intersections near Bryant.

== Future developments ==
Between 1980 and 2000, the population of Snohomish County grew by 80 percent, resulting in increased congestion on the two-lane SR 9. Accidents have increased from an average of 325 collisions per year in the 1990s to 450 collisions per year between 2000 and 2007. Since late 2005, WSDOT has been improving the corridor with six projects located between SR 522 and the Skagit County line that are scheduled to be completed by 2013. South of Snohomish, WSDOT is improving the highway in multiple ways including new intersections and alignments, new web cameras and new turn lanes. Between SR 524 and Clearview, the 2-lane road is being widened to a four-lane divided highway starting in 2011. The SR 531 intersection south of Arlington was scheduled to be rebuilt as a roundabout in 2011. The roundabout option was chosen over a traffic signal in early October 2009. A route development plan is currently being designed for the highway between SR 522 and Schloman Road north of Arlington. During a project to widen SR 9 in Lake Stevens, a left-turn lane to Lake Stevens Road was removed in 2009 and residents located on the road have protested. The intersection of SR 9 and SR 204 in Lake Stevens was replaced with a series of four roundabouts that opened in July 2023.

WSDOT plans to widen SR 9 near downtown Snohomish to four lanes by building a second bridge over the Snohomish River to carry southbound traffic. The $142 million project is projected to be completed in 2025.

== Major intersections ==
County	Location	mi	km	Destinations	Notes
Snohomish		0.00	0.00	SR 522 – Seattle, Monroe	Southern terminus; interchange
Snohomish		1.57	2.53	SR 524 (Maltby Road)	
Snohomish		6.97	11.22	SR 96 west (Lowell Larimer Road) – Mill Creek	
Snohomish	Snohomish	9.58	15.42	Second Street	Interchange
Snohomish	Snohomish	10.87	17.49	Bickford Avenue / Avenue D	Former US 2
Snohomish		12.23	19.68	US 2 (Stevens Pass Highway) – Everett, Monroe, Wenatchee	Interchange
Snohomish	Lake Stevens	15.76	25.36	SR 204 west – Everett	
Snohomish	Lake Stevens	17.49	28.15	SR 92 east – Granite Falls	
Snohomish	Marysville	19.26	31.00	SR 528 west (64th Street Northeast) – Marysville	
Snohomish	Arlington	26.05	41.92	SR 531 west (172nd Street Northeast) – Smokey Point	Roundabout
Snohomish	Arlington	29.46	47.41	SR 530 west to I-5 / Division Street	Southern end of SR 530 concurrency
Snohomish	Arlington	29.57	47.59	SR 530 east (Burke Avenue) – Darrington	Northern end of SR 530 concurrency
Skagit	Lake McMurray	40.03	64.42	SR 534 west to I-5	
Skagit		49.78	80.11	SR 538 west (College Way) to I-5 – Mount Vernon	Roundabout
Skagit	Sedro-Woolley	55.89	89.95	SR 20 west (North Cascades Highway) – Burlington	Southern end of SR 20 concurrency
Skagit	Sedro-Woolley	57.17	92.01	SR 20 east (North Cascades Highway) – Concrete	Northern end of SR 20 concurrency
Whatcom	Deming	79.41	127.80	SR 542 east (Mount Baker Highway) – Glacier, Mt. Baker	Roundabout; southern end of SR 542 concurrency
Whatcom		84.01	135.20	SR 542 west – Bellingham	Roundabout; northern end of SR 542 concurrency
Whatcom	Nooksack	90.36	145.42	SR 544 west – Everson	
Whatcom		93.61	150.65	SR 546 west (East Badger Road) – Lynden	
Whatcom	Sumas	97.50	156.91	SR 547 south – Mt. Baker	
Whatcom	Sumas	98.00	157.72	SR 9 Spur north (Garfield Street) – Truck Crossing	
Whatcom	Sumas	98.17	157.99	Highway 11 north – Abbotsford, Mission, Maple Ridge	Northern terminus at Canada–United States border
1.000 mi = 1.609 km; 1.000 km = 0.621 mi: Concurrency terminus; Route transition

=== Spur intersections ===
The entire spur is in Sumas, Whatcom County.

mi	km	Destinations	Notes
0.00	0.00	SR 9 (Cherry Street) – Nooksack, Sedro-Woolley, Arlington	Southern terminus
0.24	0.39	Boundary Street	Northern terminus at Canada–United States border
1.000 mi = 1.609 km; 1.000 km = 0.621 mi
