= Washington State Route 534 =

State highway in Skagit County, Washington, US

State Route 534

- SR 534 highlighted in red

Route information
- Auxiliary route of I-5
- Maintained by WSDOT
- Length: 5.08 mi (8.18 km)
- Existed: 1964–present

Major junctions
- West end: I-5 in Conway
- East end: SR 9 in Lake McMurray

Location
- Country: United States
- State: Washington
- Counties: Skagit

Highway system
- State highways in Washington; Interstate; US; State; Scenic; Pre-1964; 1964 renumbering; Former
← SR 532	→ SR 536

State Route 534 (SR 534) is a short Washington state highway located in Skagit County. The 5.08-mile (8.18 km) long route runs east from Interstate 5 (I-5) in Conway to SR 9 in Lake McMurray. The highway was first designated as a state-maintained highway in 1937, when it became Secondary State Highway 1H (SSH 1H) as part of the creation of the Primary and secondary state highways; SSH 1H later became SR 534 during the 1964 highway renumbering.

== Route description ==
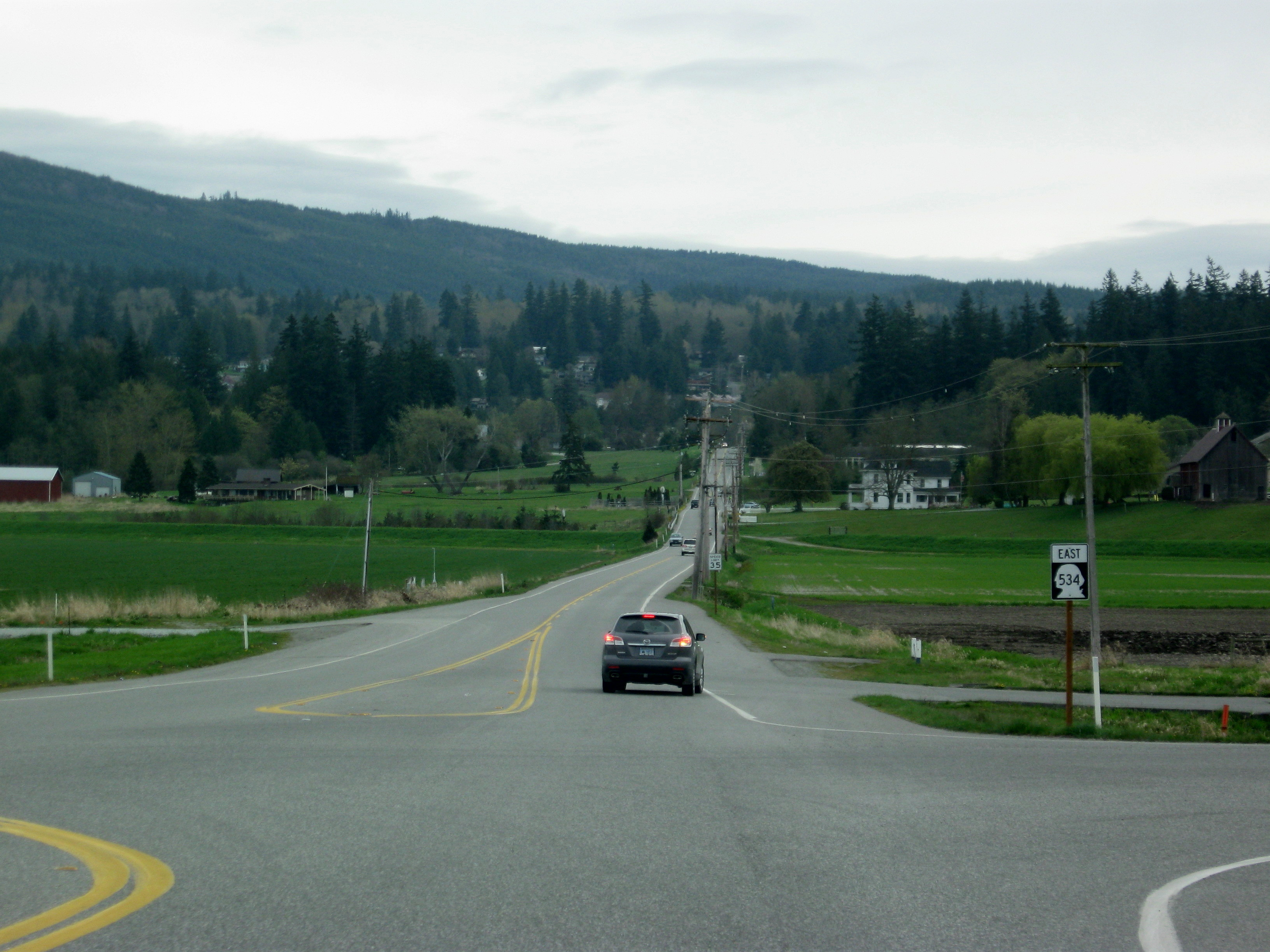
Looking eastbound on SR 534 from its western terminus, I-5 in Conway

SR 534 begins at an interchange with I-5 in Conway, located near the mouth of the Skagit River east of Fir Island. The highway is a continuation of the Pioneer Highway, which travels south from Conway to Stanwood. SR 534 travels east and passes an elementary school before it ascends from the Skagit Valley into hilly terrain. The highway travels southeast and reaches its eastern terminus at SR 9 in Lake McMurray.

The two-lane rural highway primarily serves as a short connector between I-5 and SR 9. SR 534 is maintained by the Washington State Department of Transportation (WSDOT), which conducts an annual survey of traffic volume that is expressed in terms of annual average daily traffic. Average traffic volumes on the highway in 2016 ranged from a minimum of 1,300 vehicles at SR 9 in Lake McMurray to a maximum of 8,300 vehicles at the I-5 interchange.

== History ==
The shield of Secondary State Highway 1H (SSH 1H) from 1937 to 1964.

The first highway that would later become SR 534 was Secondary State Highway 1H (SSH 1H), which was first designated in 1937. The road ran from Primary State Highway 1 (PSH 1) in Conway to SSH 1A in Lake McMurray. During the 1964 highway renumbering, SSH 1H became SR 534, PSH 1 became Interstate 5 (I-5) and SSH 1A became SR 9.

The highway's western terminus in Conway was originally an intersection where several fatal collisions occurred during the 1960s. Plans to replace the intersection with a grade-separated interchange were published by the state government in 1968 as part of improvements to I-5 to bring it to Interstate Highway standards. Construction began in July 1969 and was expected to be completed within two years, but was delayed due to difficulty working with the soil over the winter months. SR 534 was relocated to a new overpass at the completed interchange in 1971.

== Major intersections ==
The entire route is in Skagit County.

Location	mi	km	Destinations	Notes
	0.00	0.00	I-5 – Seattle, Vancouver, B.C.	Continues west as Pioneer Highway
	5.08	8.18	SR 9 – Sedro-Woolley, Arlington	
1.000 mi = 1.609 km; 1.000 km = 0.621 mi
