= Lake McMurray, Washington =

- CDP
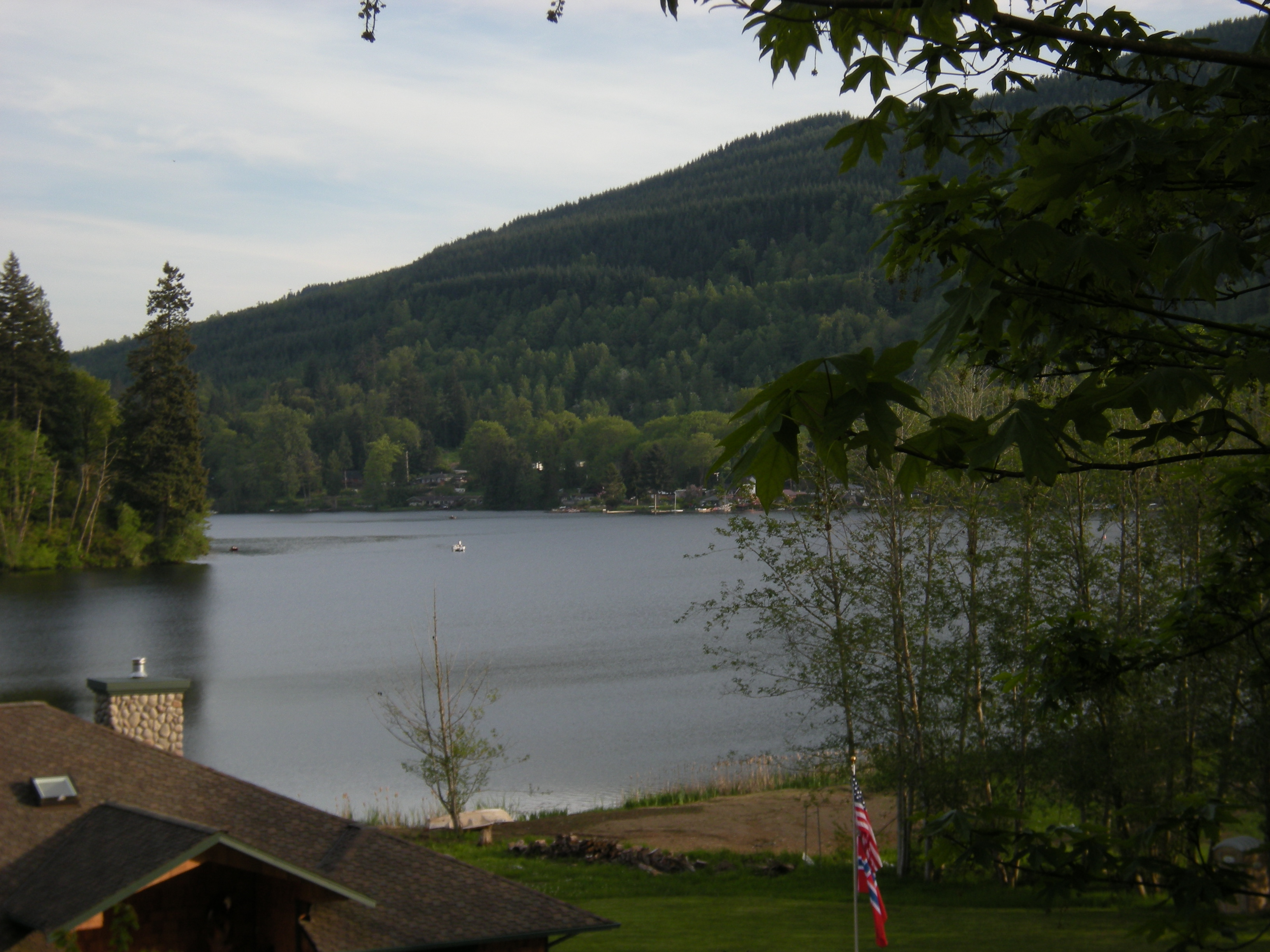

- Location of Lake McMurray, Washington
- Coordinates: 48°19′04″N 122°13′55″W
- Country: United States
- State: Washington
- County: Skagit

Area
  - Total: 1.0 sq mi (2.7 km^{2})
  - Land: 0.81 sq mi (2.1 km^{2})
  - Water: 0.19 sq mi (0.5 km^{2})
- Elevation: 236 ft (72 m)

Population (2020)
  - Total: 382
  - Density: 470/sq mi (180/km^{2})
- Time zone: UTC-8 (Pacific (PST))
  - Summer (DST): UTC-7 (PDT)
- ZIP Code: 98274
- Area code(s): 360, 564
- FIPS code: 53-37526
- GNIS feature ID: 2408543

Lake McMurray is a census-designated place (CDP) in Skagit County, Washington, United States. The population was 382 at the 2020 census. It is included in the Mount Vernon–Anacortes, Washington Metropolitan Statistical Area.

Based on per capita income, Lake McMurray ranks 43rd of 522 ranked areas in the state of Washington.

== History ==
McMurray was platted in 1890 when the railroad was extended to that point. A post office called McMurray was established in 1890, and remained in operation until 1945. The nearby lake of the same name perpetuates the name of an early settler. In the native Lushootseed language, the lake is called qəbúʔlaɬ.

== Education ==
Lake McMurray is part of the Conway School District.

== Geography ==
According to the United States Census Bureau, the CDP has a total area of 1.0 square miles (2.7 km^{2}), of which, 0.8 square miles (2.1 km^{2}) of it is land and 0.2 square miles (0.5 km^{2}) of it (19.42%) is water.

== Demographics ==
Historical population
Census	Pop.	Note	%±
2000	200		—
2010	192		−4.0%
2020	382		99.0%
U.S. Decennial Census; 1970 1980 1990; 2000 2010

Lake McMurray first appeared as a census designated place in the 2000 U.S. census.

=== Racial and ethnic composition ===
Lake McMurray CDP, Washington – Racial and ethnic composition Note: the US Census treats Hispanic/Latino as an ethnic category. This table excludes Latinos from the racial categories and assigns them to a separate category. Hispanics/Latinos may be of any race.
Race / Ethnicity (NH = Non-Hispanic)	Pop 2000	Pop 2010	Pop 2020	% 2000	% 2010	% 2020
White alone (NH)	179	165	329	89.50%	85.94%	86.13%
Black or African American alone (NH)	1	0	0	0.50%	0.00%	0.00%
Native American or Alaska Native alone (NH)	0	0	0	0.00%	0.00%	0.00%
Asian alone (NH)	7	6	9	3.50%	3.13%	2.36%
Native Hawaiian or Pacific Islander alone (NH)	4	0	1	2.00%	0.00%	0.26%
Other race alone (NH)	1	0	2	0.50%	0.00%	0.52%
Mixed race or Multiracial (NH)	7	0	24	3.50%	0.00%	6.28%
Hispanic or Latino (any race)	1	21	17	0.50%	10.94%	4.45%
Total	200	192	382	100.00%	100.00%	100.00%

=== 2000 census ===
As of the census of 2000, there were 200 people, 83 households, and 62 families residing in the CDP. The population density was 242.5 people per square mile (94.2/km^{2}). There were 104 housing units at an average density of 126.1/sq mi (49.0/km^{2}). The racial makeup of the CDP was 90.00% White, 0.50% African American, 3.50% Asian, 2.00% Pacific Islander, 0.50% from other races, and 3.50% from two or more races. Hispanic or Latino of any race were 0.50% of the population.

There were 83 households, out of which 31.3% had children under the age of 18 living with them, 65.1% were married couples living together, 4.8% had a female householder with no husband present, and 25.3% were non-families. 22.9% of all households were made up of individuals, and 12.0% had someone living alone who was 65 years of age or older. The average household size was 2.41 and the average family size was 2.79.

In the CDP, the age distribution of the population shows 20.5% under the age of 18, 5.5% from 18 to 24, 24.5% from 25 to 44, 33.5% from 45 to 64, and 16.0% who were 65 years of age or older. The median age was 44 years. For every 100 females, there were 124.7 males. For every 100 females age 18 and over, there were 114.9 males.

The median income for a household in the CDP was $65,536, and the median income for a family was $62,083. Males had a median income of $36,071 versus $39,375 for females. The per capita income for the CDP was $29,051. None of the population or families were below the poverty line.

== Major roads ==
- State Route 9 (SR9) - Highway 9
- SR 534

== Education ==
The community is served by the Conway School District.
