= Washington State Route 538 =

State highway in Skagit County, Washington, US

State Route 538
- College Way
- SR 538 highlighted in red

Route information
- Auxiliary route of I-5
- Maintained by WSDOT
- Length: 3.62 mi (5.83 km)
- Existed: 1964–present

Major junctions
- West end: I-5 in Mount Vernon
- East end: SR 9 near Mount Vernon

Location
- Country: United States
- State: Washington
- Counties: Skagit

Highway system
- State highways in Washington; Interstate; US; State; Scenic; Pre-1964; 1964 renumbering; Former
← SR 536	→ SR 539

State Route 538 (SR 538, alternatively named College Way) is a 3.62-mile (5.83 km)-long state highway located within the northern area of Mount Vernon city limits and the urban growth boundary, located in Skagit County, a subdivision of the U.S. state of Washington. The highway, which has existed as a county road since 1911, travels from Interstate 5 (I-5) in the west, passing former U.S. Route 99 (US 99), now Riverside Drive, and Skagit Valley College's main Mount Vernon campus before terminating at a roundabout with SR 9.

Before being designated Secondary State Highway 1G (SSH 1G) in 1937, the current roadway that is now SR 538 was a county road through farmland for 26 years. SSH 1G traveled between Primary State Highway 1 (PSH 1), also known as US 99, and SSH 1A until 1964, when the current designation of SR 538 was created. US 99 was bypassed by I-5 after 1966 and became Riverside Drive. The roundabout at SR 9 was constructed in 2007 while the Riverside Drive intersection was widened in 2009.

== Route description ==
State Route 538 (SR 538) begins at the Interstate 5 (I-5) interchange in northern Mount Vernon located south of the Skagit River. The roadway, which handled a daily average of 27,000 motorists at the interchange in 2008, is named College Way and travels east through a commercial zone, passing Riverside Drive, the former route of U.S. Route 99 (US 99), and crossing a set of rail tracks used by BNSF Railway. Transitioning from a commercial to residential area, the Mount Vernon campus of the Skagit Valley College, located on the north side of the highway, is passed and eventually SR 538 leaves Mount Vernon city limits. The road turns southeast and ends at a roundabout with SR 9 within Mount Vernon's urban growth boundary.

== History ==
Originating as a county road by 1911, SR 538 was designated Secondary State Highway 1G (SSH 1G) in 1937. SSH 1G ran from Primary State Highway 1 (PSH 1), co-signed as U.S. Route 99 (US 99), to SSH 1A. During the 1964 highway renumbering, SR 538 was created to replace SSH 1G, PSH 1 and US 99 were replaced with Interstate 5 (I-5) and SR 9 replaced SSH 1A. I-5 was not built until after 1966 and the western terminus of SR 538 was still US 99. Between early June and late July 2007, the Washington State Department of Transportation (WSDOT) constructed a roundabout at the SR 9 and Schopf Lane intersection, the first in Skagit County. The new roundabout reduced the length of SR 538 by 0.05-mile (0.08 km).

In early 2009, between I-5 and 18th Street, WSDOT repaved the highway and expanded the Riverside Drive intersection. A city-led project to widen the section of College Way that passes under I-5 at the western terminus of SR 538 began construction in December 2018 and was completed in 2020. The street was expanded to six lanes, including dedicated left turn lanes and two through lanes that are separated from the rest of traffic by the columns of the underpass.

== Plans ==
A planned repaving project is scheduled for 2028 to pave the section of SR 538 between the railroad tracks and SR 9.

== Major intersections ==
The entire highway is in Skagit County.

Location	mi	km	Destinations	Notes
Mount Vernon	0.00	0.00	I-5 – Seattle, Vancouver, BC	Western terminus, interchange; continues west as West College Way
Mount Vernon	0.27	0.43	Riverside Drive	Former US 99
	3.62	5.83	SR 9 – Sedro-Woolley, Arlington	Eastern terminus, roundabout
1.000 mi = 1.609 km; 1.000 km = 0.621 mi
