= Tom Ackerman (American football) =

American football player (born 1972)

No. 67, 69
- Position: Center

Personal information
- Born: September 6, 1972 (age 54); Bellingham, Washington, U.S.
- Listed height: 6 ft 3 in (1.91 m)
- Listed weight: 290 lb (132 kg)

Career information
- High school: Nooksack Valley (Everson, Washington)
- College: Eastern Washington
- NFL draft: 1996: 5th round, 145th overall pick

Career history
- New Orleans Saints (1996–2001); Oakland Raiders (2002)*; Tennessee Titans (2002–2003)
- * Offseason or practice squad member only

Career NFL statistics
- Games played: 105
- Games started: 21
- Stats at Pro Football Reference

Thomas Michael Ackerman (September 6, 1972) is an American former professional football player who was a center in the National Football League (NFL). He played college football for the Eastern Washington Eagles and was selected by the New Orleans Saints in the fifth round (145th overall) of the 1996 NFL draft. He played for the Saints for the next 6 seasons. After the Saints, he signed with the Tennessee Titans and played for them for the next two seasons.
