= Jim Sterk =

American college sports administrator

Current position
- Title: Athletic director
- Team: Western Washington
- Conference: GNAC

Biographical details
- Born: June 10, 1956 (age 70); Bellingham, Washington, U.S.
- Education: Western Washington University

Administrative career (AD unless noted)
- 1987–1990: Maine (assistant director of finance)
- 1990–1991: Seattle Pacific (associate AD)
- 1991–1995: Tulane (senior associate AD)
- 1995–2000: Portland State
- 2000–2010: Washington State
- 2010–2016: San Diego State
- 2016–2021: Missouri
- 2023–present: Western Washington

Jim Sterk (born June 10, 1956) is an American university sports administrator who is currently the athletic director for Western Washington University. He has previously served as athletic director for Portland State University, Washington State University, San Diego State University, and the University of Missouri.

== Early life and education ==
Jim Sterk was born on June 10, 1956, in Bellingham, Washington, and was raised in Nooksack, Washington. He received his bachelor's degree in 1980 from Western Washington University, and in 1986 received his master's degree in sports administration from Ohio University.

== Athletic director ==
=== Portland State ===
After working in various positions at Maine, Seattle Pacific, and Tulane, Sterk became the athletic director for Portland State. While at Portland State, he oversaw the transition from Division II to Division I.

=== Washington State ===
In 2000, Sterk left Portland State and accepted a job as athletic director for Washington State. During his tenure, Washington State excelled academically in the Pac-10, and saw an increase in donations and annual gifts.

=== San Diego State ===
Sterk left Washington State to become the athletic director at San Diego State. During his time San Diego State, the athletic program improved on various levels, including their basketball team having a streak of 72 sold-out games and their football team going 11–3 and beating Cincinnati in the Hawaii Bowl in his final year.

=== Missouri ===
On September 1, 2016, Sterk became the athletic director for Missouri. Former San Diego State player Marshall Faulk commended the hiring. Under Sterk's watch, Missouri has advanced academically with its athletic teams. On July 26, 2021, Sterk announced that he would step down as athletic director for Missouri and would leave once his replacement was found.

=== Western Washington ===
After returning to San Diego State as a planned giving special consultant in 2022, Sterk became athletic director at his alma mater, Western Washington University, in 2023.

== Personal life ==
Sterk is married to his wife, Debi, and they have three daughters together: Ashley, Amy and Abby.
