= Laurel, Washington =

Unincorporated community in Washington, United States

- Unincorporated community
- Interactive map of Laurel, Washington
- Coordinates: 48°51′18″N 122°29′09″W
- Country: United States
- State: Washington
- County: Whatcom
- Elevation: 85 ft (26 m)
- Time zone: UTC-8 (Pacific (PST))
  - Summer (DST): UTC-7 (PDT)
- Area code(s): 360, 564
- GNIS feature ID: 1511092

Laurel is an unincorporated community in Whatcom County, Washington, United States. It lies between the cities of Bellingham and Lynden on State Route 539.
