= Casey Bauman =

American football player (born 2000)

Profile
- Position: Quarterback

Personal information
- Born: May 18, 2000 (age 26); Bellingham, Washington, U.S.
- Listed height: 6 ft 6 in (1.98 m)
- Listed weight: 238 lb (108 kg)

Career information
- High school: Nooksack Valley (Whatcom County, Washington)
- College: Montana State (2018–2021); Augustana (SD) (2022–2023)
- NFL draft: 2024: undrafted

Career history
- Los Angeles Chargers (2024)*
- * Offseason or practice squad member only

Casey Burnell Bauman (born May 18, 2000) is an American former professional football quarterback. He played college football for the Montana State Bobcats and the Augustana Vikings.

== Early life ==
Bauman was born in 2000 in Bellingham, Washington, and grew up outside of Sumas, near the Canadian border neighbouring Abbotsford; he qualified for Canadian citizenship through his mother who was born there. He attended Nooksack Valley High School where he was a standout quarterback on the football team. He became a starter early in his sophomore year and ultimately set school records with 7,437 passing yards, 65 passing touchdowns and 26 rushing touchdowns. He was named first-team All-Northwest Conference in his last two years and totaled 2,914 passing yards with 27 touchdowns to three interceptions as a senior. He committed to play college football for the Montana State Bobcats.

== College career ==
Bauman redshirted as a true freshman at Montana State in 2018, completing his only pass in his only game. He won the starting quarterback job for the 2019 season. However, he was benched after only three games. He ended the season having completed 41-of-85 pass attempts for 450 yards and one touchdown. He battled injuries afterwards and only appeared in three games in the rest of his tenure at Montana State – each in 2021 when he completed all four of his pass attempts for 23 yards and one touchdown. He entered the NCAA transfer portal in 2022.

Bauman transferred to the Augustana Vikings in South Dakota and won the battle for the starting quarterback role, although he remained limited by injuries throughout the season. He appeared in a total of eight games and completed 111 of 195 pass attempts for 1,282 yards and 14 touchdowns, along with rushing for an additional 250 yards. He remained starter in 2023 and appeared in 13 games, passing for 2,878 passing yards and 29 touchdowns to nine interceptions, along 322 rushing yards and five touchdowns on 99 carries.

== Professional career ==
Pre-draft measurables
Height	Weight	Arm length	Hand span	Wingspan	40-yard dash	10-yard split	20-yard split	20-yard shuttle	Three-cone drill	Vertical jump	Broad jump
6 ft 6 3/8 in (1.99 m)	227 lb (103 kg)	33 7/8 in (0.86 m)	10 in (0.25 m)	6 ft 11 1/8 in (2.11 m)	4.94 s	1.74 s	2.82 s	4.29 s	7.25 s	35.5 in (0.90 m)	9 ft 10 in (3.00 m)
All values from Augustana's Pro Day

Bauman was eligible for both the 2024 NFL draft and 2024 CFL draft, being one of three quarterback invites to the CFL Combine. After going unselected in the NFL draft, he signed with the Los Angeles Chargers as an undrafted free agent. Bauman was expected to be a late round CFL draft selection, however, he went unselected in CFL draft. He was waived by the Chargers on August 12, 2024.
