= Bryant, Washington =

- CDP
- Location of Bryant, Washington.
- Coordinates: 48°14′54″N 122°10′28″W
- Country: United States
- State: Washington
- County: Snohomish

Area
  - Total: 6.175 sq mi (15.99 km^{2})
  - Land: 6.141 sq mi (15.91 km^{2})
  - Water: 0.034 sq mi (0.088 km^{2})

Population (2010)
  - Total: 2,128
  - Density: 346.5/sq mi (133.8/km^{2})
- Time zone: UTC-8 (Pacific (PST))
  - Summer (DST): UTC-7 (PDT)
- ZIP Code: 98223
- Area code(s): 360, 564
- GNIS feature ID: 1512041

Bryant is a census-designated place (CDP) in Snohomish County, Washington, United States. As of the 2020 census, Bryant had a population of 2,128.

A post office called Bryant was established in 1893, and remained in operation until 1954. The community most likely took its name from the Bryant Lumber and Shingle Company.

== Geography ==
Bryant is located at 48°14′54″N 122°10′28″W (48.248420, -122.174430).

According to the United States Census Bureau, the CDP has a total area of 6.175 square miles (15.99 km^{2}), of which, 6.141 square miles (15.91 km^{2}) of it is land and 0.034 square miles (0.09 km^{2}) of it (0.55%) is water.

== Demographics ==
Historical population
| Census | Pop. | Note | %± |
|---|---|---|---|
| 2010 | 1,870 | | — |
| 2020 | 2,128 | | 13.8% |
U.S. Decennial Census; 2000 2010

Bryant first appeared as a census designated place in the 2010 U.S. census.

=== Racial and ethnic composition ===
Bryant CDP, Washington – Racial and ethnic composition Note: the US Census treats Hispanic/Latino as an ethnic category. This table excludes Latinos from the racial categories and assigns them to a separate category. Hispanics/Latinos may be of any race.
| Race / Ethnicity (NH = Non-Hispanic) | Pop 2010 | Pop 2020 | % 2010 | % 2020 |
|---|---|---|---|---|
| White alone (NH) | 1,743 | 1,823 | 93.21% | 85.67% |
| Black or African American alone (NH) | 4 | 8 | 0.21% | 0.38% |
| Native American or Alaska Native alone (NH) | 32 | 27 | 1.71% | 1.27% |
| Asian alone (NH) | 16 | 40 | 0.86% | 1.88% |
| Native Hawaiian or Pacific Islander alone (NH) | 1 | 2 | 0.05% | 0.09% |
| Other race alone (NH) | 2 | 19 | 0.11% | 0.89% |
| Mixed race or Multiracial (NH) | 20 | 129 | 1.07% | 6.06% |
| Hispanic or Latino (any race) | 52 | 80 | 2.78% | 3.76% |
| Total | 1,870 | 2,128 | 100.00% | 100.00% |

== Education ==
The community is served by the Arlington School District.
