= Wiser Lake =

- Location within Washington (state)
- Location: Whatcom County, Washington
- Coordinates: 48°54′13″N 122°28′52″W
- Type: lake
- Basin countries: United States
- Surface elevation: 56 ft (17 m)

Wiser Lake is a lake in the U.S. state of Washington. It is split in two halves by State Route 539 (the Guide Meridian).

Wiser Lake bears the name of Jack Wiser, a pioneer who settled there.

== See also ==
- List of lakes in Washington
