= Conway, Washington =

- CDP
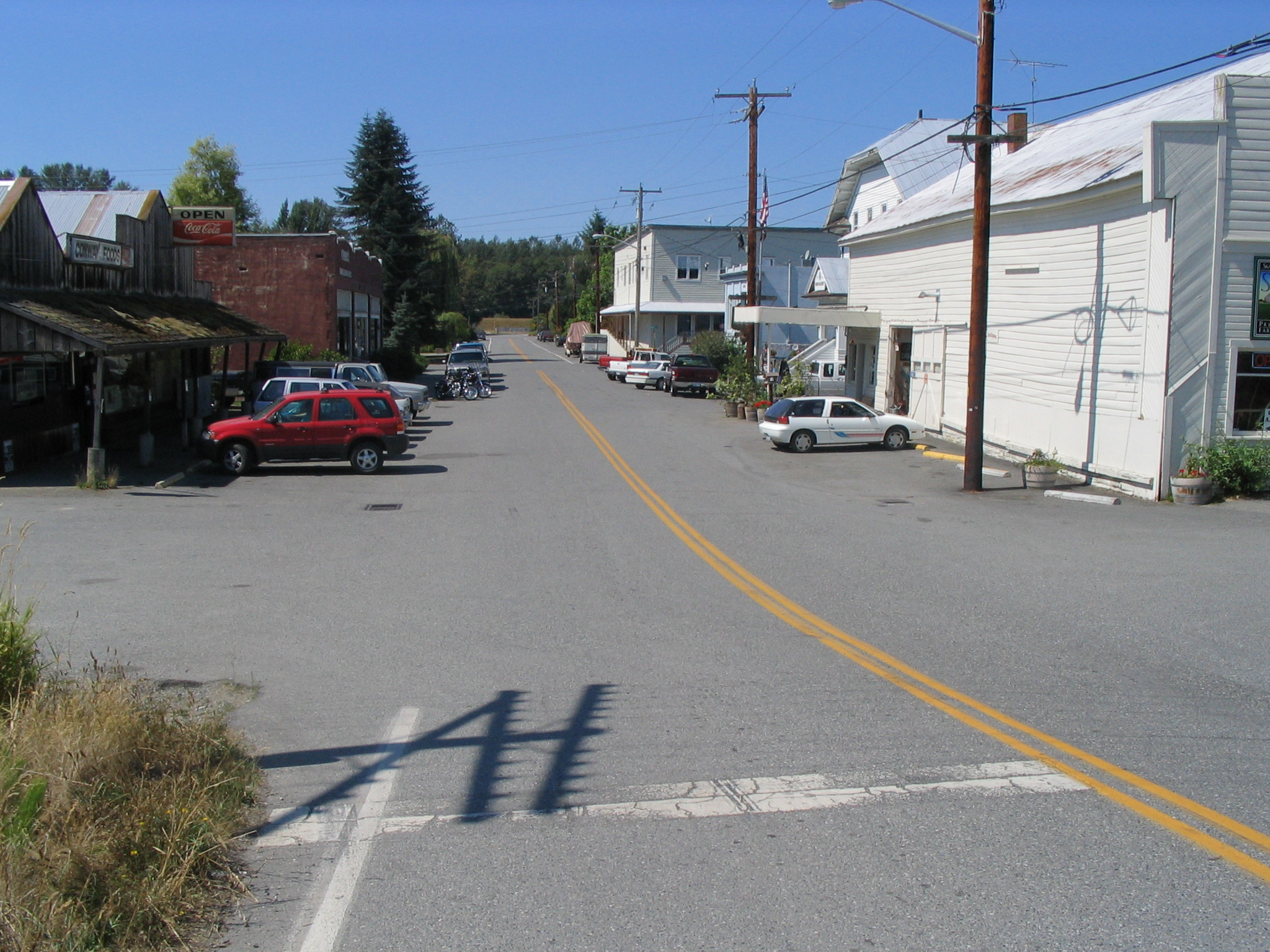
- Main Street

- Location of Conway, Washington
- Coordinates: 48°20′08″N 122°20′40″W
- Country: United States
- State: Washington
- County: Skagit

Area
  - Total: 0.27 sq mi (0.7 km^{2})
  - Land: 0.27 sq mi (0.7 km^{2})
  - Water: 0 sq mi (0.0 km^{2})
- Elevation: 7 ft (2.1 m)

Population (2020)
  - Total: 87
  - Density: 320/sq mi (120/km^{2})
- Time zone: UTC-8 (Pacific (PST))
  - Summer (DST): UTC-7 (PDT)
- ZIP Code: 98238
- Area code: 360, 564
- FIPS code: 53-14520
- GNIS feature ID: 2407654

Conway is a census-designated place (CDP) in Skagit County, Washington, United States. First settled in 1873 by Thomas P. Jones and Charles Villeneuves, its population was 87 at the 2020 census. It is included in the Mount Vernon–Anacortes, Washington Metropolitan Statistical Area.

== Geography ==
According to the United States Census Bureau, the census-designated place of Conway has a total area of 0.3 square miles (0.7 km^{2}), all of it land.

== Education ==
The community is served by the Conway School District. Children attend school at the Conway Elementary School from kindergarten through to the 8th grade.

The school district has no high school; parents are permitted to send their children to any of the surrounding high schools, including Stanwood, Mount Vernon, or LaConner. The majority of high school students residing in Conway attend Mount Vernon High School, as it is the only high school that provides a bus to the Conway area.

== Demographics ==
Historical population
Census	Pop.	Note	%±
2000	84		—
2010	91		8.3%
2020	87		−4.4%
U.S. Decennial Census; 1970 1980 1990; 2000 2010

Conway first appeared as a census designated place in the 2000 U.S. census.

=== Racial and ethnic composition ===
Conway CDP, Washington – Racial and ethnic composition Note: the US Census treats Hispanic/Latino as an ethnic category. This table excludes Latinos from the racial categories and assigns them to a separate category. Hispanics/Latinos may be of any race.
Race / Ethnicity (NH = Non-Hispanic)	Pop 2000	Pop 2010	Pop 2020	% 2000	% 2010	% 2020
White alone (NH)	75	72	64	89.29%	79.12%	73.56%
Black or African American alone (NH)	0	0	0	0.00%	0.00%	0.00%
Native American or Alaska Native alone (NH)	0	0	0	0.00%	0.00%	0.00%
Asian alone (NH)	0	1	1	0.00%	1.10%	1.15%
Native Hawaiian or Pacific Islander alone (NH)	0	0	0	0.00%	0.00%	0.00%
Other race alone (NH)	0	0	0	0.00%	0.00%	0.00%
Mixed race or Multiracial (NH)	2	1	4	2.38%	1.10%	4.60%
Hispanic or Latino (any race)	7	17	18	8.33%	18.68%	20.69%
Total	84	91	87	100.00%	100.00%	100.00%

=== 2000 census ===
As of the census of 2000, there were 84 people, 28 households, and 22 families residing in the census-designated place. The population density was 324.9 people per square mile (124.7/km^{2}). There were 29 housing units at an average density of 112.2/sq.mi (43.1/km^{2}). The racial makeup of the census-designated place was 95.24% White, and 4.76% from two or more races. Hispanic or Latino of any race were 8.33% of the population.

There were 28 households, out of which 50% had children under the age of 18 living with them, 64.3% were married couples living together, 10.7% had a female householder with no husband present, and 17.9% were non-families. 10.7% of all households were made up of individuals, and 3.6% were people living alone of 65 years or older. The average household size was 3.00 and the average family size was 3.22.

In the census-designated place the age distribution of the population shows 33.3% under the age of 18, 4.8% from 18 to 24, 33.3% from 25 to 44, 22.6% from 45 to 64, and 6.0% who were 65 years of age or older. The median age was 36 years. For every 100 females, there were 104.9 males. For every 100 females age 18 and over, there were 107.4 males.

The median income for a household in the census-designated place was $33,750, and the median income for a family was $28,750. The per capita income for the census-designated place of Conway was $12,206. None of the population or families were below the poverty line.
