= Big Lake, Washington =

- CDP
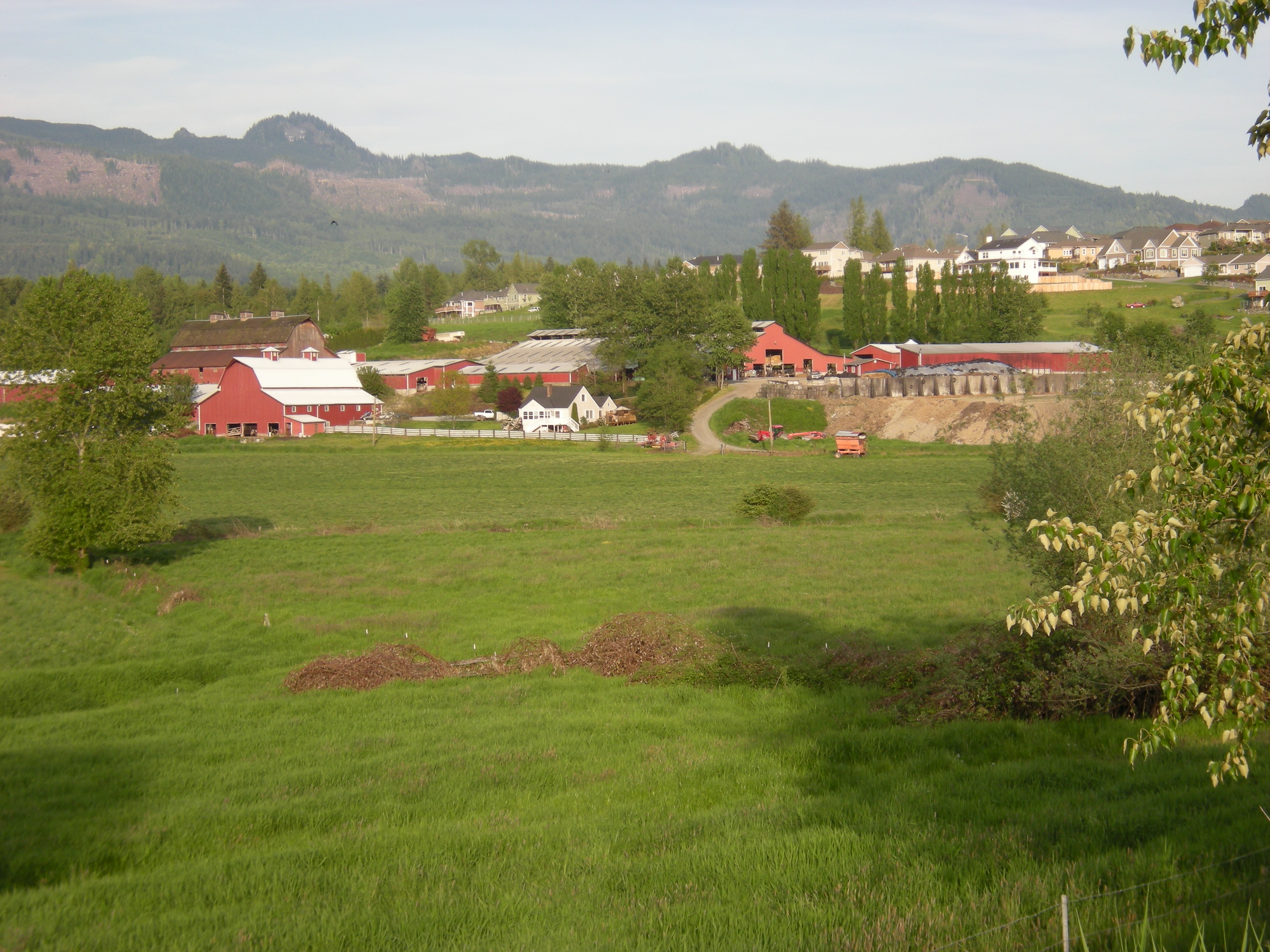

- Location of Big Lake, Washington
- Coordinates: 48°22′46″N 122°14′40″W
- Country: United States
- State: Washington
- County: Skagit

Area
  - Total: 4.7 sq mi (12.3 km^{2})
  - Land: 3.9 sq mi (10.2 km^{2})
  - Water: 0.77 sq mi (2.0 km^{2})
- Elevation: 95 ft (29 m)

Population (2020)
  - Total: 2,980
  - Density: 757/sq mi (292.2/km^{2})
- Time zone: UTC-8 (Pacific (PST))
  - Summer (DST): UTC-7 (PDT)
- FIPS code: 53-06050
- GNIS feature ID: 2407841

Big Lake is a census-designated place (CDP) in Skagit County, Washington, United States. As of the 2020 census, Big Lake had a population of 2,980. It is included in the Mount Vernon–Anacortes, Washington Metropolitan Statistical Area.

Big Lake is an exurban community in a fairly rural setting, although recent years have seen significant suburban development. The area, however, has remained primarily residential. A few notable exceptions include a playable 9-hole golf course on the lake's east side, a 1950s-themed bar & grill, a quaint community store, and a small elementary school. The latter two are located at the historic north end of the lake, once a bustling logging town. A fire destroyed much of the town proper in the early 1900s, and that which was lost was never rebuilt.

Based on per capita income, Big Lake ranks 134th of 522 areas in the state of Washington to be ranked.

== Geography ==
According to the United States Census Bureau, the CDP has a total area of 4.7 square miles (12.3 km^{2}), of which, 4.0 square miles (10.2 km^{2}) of it is land and 0.8 square miles (2.0 km^{2}) of it (16.46%) is water.

== Demographics ==
Historical population
Census	Pop.	Note	%±
2000	1,153		—
2010	1,835		59.2%
2020	2,980		62.4%
U.S. Decennial Census; 1970 1980 1990; 2000 2010

Big Lake first appeared as a census designated place in the 2000 U.S. census.

=== Racial and ethnic composition ===
Big Lake CDP, Washington – Racial and ethnic composition Note: the US Census treats Hispanic/Latino as an ethnic category. This table excludes Latinos from the racial categories and assigns them to a separate category. Hispanics/Latinos may be of any race.
Race / Ethnicity (NH = Non-Hispanic)	Pop 2000	Pop 2010	Pop 2020	% 2000	% 2010	% 2020
White alone (NH)	1,079	1,647	2,476	93.58%	89.75%	83.09%
Black or African American alone (NH)	4	7	17	0.35%	0.38%	0.57%
Native American or Alaska Native alone (NH)	12	10	26	1.04%	0.54%	0.87%
Asian alone (NH)	0	38	55	0.00%	2.07%	1.85%
Native Hawaiian or Pacific Islander alone (NH)	1	1	4	0.09%	0.05%	0.13%
Other race alone (NH)	0	1	11	0.00%	0.05%	0.37%
Mixed race or Multiracial (NH)	25	26	176	2.17%	1.42%	5.91%
Hispanic or Latino (any race)	32	105	215	2.78%	5.72%	7.21%
Total	1,153	1,835	2,980	100.00%	100.00%	100.00%

=== 2000 census ===
As of the census of 2000, there were 1,153 people, 462 households, and 328 families residing in the CDP. The population density was 291.8 people per square mile (112.7/km^{2}). There were 548 housing units at an average density of 138.7/sq mi (53.6/km^{2}). The racial makeup of the CDP was 94.97% White, 0.35% African American, 1.04% Native American, 0.09% Pacific Islander, 1.30% from other races, and 2.25% from two or more races. Hispanic or Latino of any race were 2.78% of the population.

There were 462 households, out of which 27.9% had children under the age of 18 living with them, 61.5% were married couples living together, 5.8% had a female householder with no husband present, and 29.0% were non-families. 19.7% of all households were made up of individuals, and 4.5% had someone living alone who was 65 years of age or older. The average household size was 2.50 and the average family size was 2.89.

In the CDP, the age distribution of the population shows 22.7% under the age of 18, 5.8% from 18 to 24, 28.4% from 25 to 44, 30.2% from 45 to 64, and 12.8% who were 65 years of age or older. The median age was 41 years. For every 100 females, there were 104.4 males. For every 100 females age 18 and over, there were 106.7 males.

The median income for a household in the CDP was $57,500, and the median income for a family was $59,167. Males had a median income of $43,571 versus $29,821 for females. The per capita income for the CDP was $22,560. About 5.1% of families and 7.8% of the population were below the poverty line, including 14.7% of those under age 18 and 5.7% of those age 65 or over.

== Education ==
Most of the CDP is in the Sedro-Woolley School District. A western piece is in the Mount Vernon School District.
