= Sumas, Washington =

- City
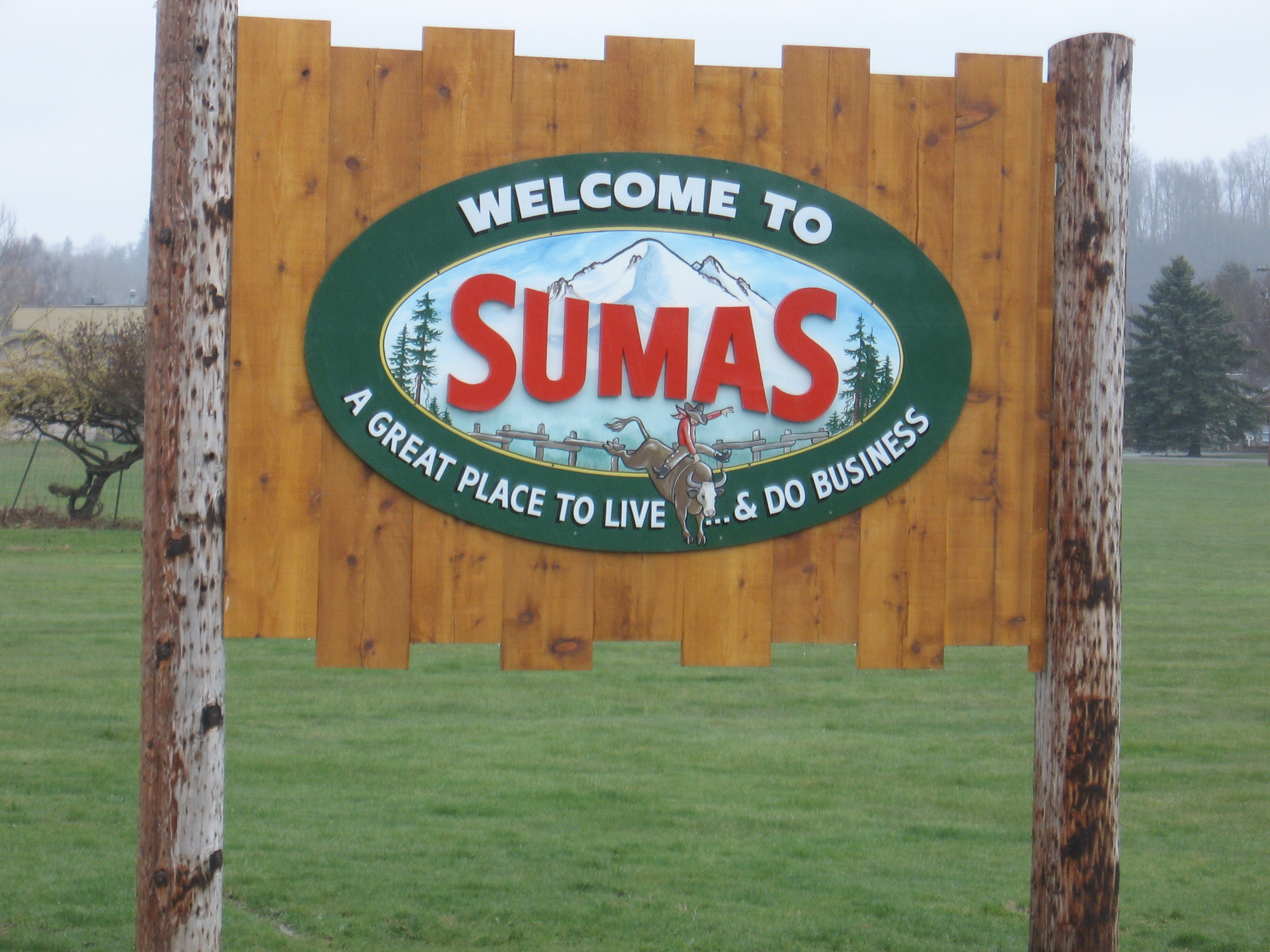
- The city's welcome sign, pictured in 2009

- Location of Sumas, Washington

- Location within Washington (state)
- Coordinates: 48°59′54″N 122°16′12″W
- Country: United States
- State: Washington
- County: Whatcom

Government
  - Type: Mayor–council
  - Mayor: Bruce Bosch

Area
  - Total: 1.47 sq mi (3.81 km^{2})
  - Land: 1.47 sq mi (3.80 km^{2})
  - Water: 0.0039 sq mi (0.01 km^{2})
- Elevation: 39 ft (12 m)

Population (2020)
  - Total: 1,583
  - Density: 1,079/sq mi (416.6/km^{2})
- Time zone: UTC−8 (Pacific (PST))
  - Summer (DST): UTC−7 (PDT)
- ZIP Code: 98295
- Area code: 360, 564
- FIPS code: 53-68330
- GNIS feature ID: 2412000
- Website: cityofsumas.com

Sumas (SOO-mas) is a city in Whatcom County, Washington, United States. It had a population of 1,583 as of the 2020 census. Sumas is located adjacent to the Canada–U.S. border and borders the city of Abbotsford, British Columbia. The Sumas–Huntingdon port of entry at the north end of State Route 9 operates 24 hours a day. Sumas shares Nooksack Valley School District with the cities of Nooksack and Everson. It is the northernmost settlement on Washington State Route 9.

== History ==
The area was home to the Nooksack Indians in the millennia prior to the arrival of the first permanent settler Robert Johnson in 1872. It was called "Sumas" meaning "land without trees" or "big flat opening." It is derived from a Cowichan tribe who also resided in the region.

Originally called "Sumas City," the town was officially incorporated on June 18, 1891. A post office with that name has been in operation since 1897.

The town was a railroad hub and briefly supported the Mount Baker Gold Rush, with some gold mining operations still ongoing in the area such as at Lone Jack mine. It was also known for a large rodeo in the early 20th Century, the "Sumas Roundup."

The area around Sumas drains into the Fraser River in Canada, in a broad floodplain. Floods from the Nooksack and Fraser rivers have been recorded ever since the area was settled. Although not the largest flood to have occurred prior to 1990, the November 10 flood received notoriety as it caused millions of dollars in damage.

On November 15, 2021, another regional flood event resulted in catastrophic flooding in Sumas. Approximately 85 percent of homes in the city were damaged and hundreds of residents were rescued after a partial evacuation.

Sumas was one of the cities hit by the 2025 Pacific Northwest floods. Residents were told to evacuate on Wednesday, December 10.

== Geography ==
According to the United States Census Bureau, the city has a total area of 1.48 square miles (3.83 km^{2}), all of it land.

Because of the limits of technology when the border with Canada was surveyed, the border west of the Cascade Range lies above the 49th parallel; the most extreme offset (three city blocks) is at Sumas, which is thus the northernmost incorporated place in the contiguous United States.

== Demographics ==
Historical population
Census	Pop.	Note	%±
1900	319		—
1910	902		182.8%
1920	854		−5.3%
1930	647		−24.2%
1940	650		0.5%
1950	658		1.2%
1960	629		−4.4%
1970	722		14.8%
1980	712		−1.4%
1990	744		4.5%
2000	960		29.0%
2010	1,307		36.1%
2020	1,583		21.1%
U.S. Decennial Census

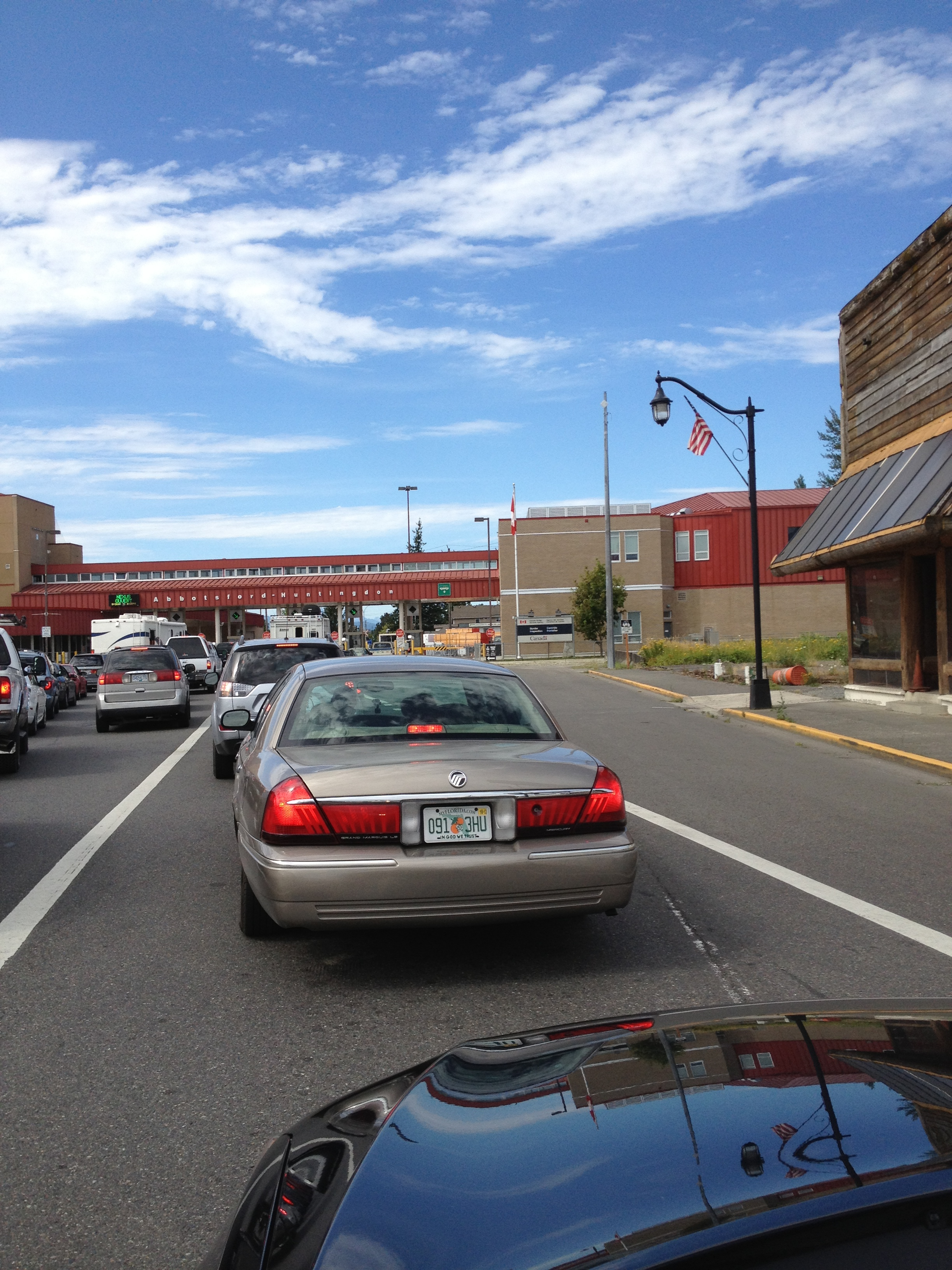
Sumas border crossing

=== 2020 census ===
As of the 2020 census, Sumas had a population of 1,583. The median age was 32.3 years. 29.6% of residents were under the age of 18 and 11.6% of residents were 65 years of age or older. For every 100 females there were 106.4 males, and for every 100 females age 18 and over there were 98.6 males age 18 and over.

0.0% of residents lived in urban areas, while 100.0% lived in rural areas.

There were 568 households in Sumas, of which 41.0% had children under the age of 18 living in them. Of all households, 49.6% were married-couple households, 20.1% were households with a male householder and no spouse or partner present, and 22.9% were households with a female householder and no spouse or partner present. About 26.4% of all households were made up of individuals and 9.7% had someone living alone who was 65 years of age or older.

There were 604 housing units, of which 6.0% were vacant. The homeowner vacancy rate was 1.3% and the rental vacancy rate was 5.5%.

Racial composition as of the 2020 census
Race	Number	Percent
White	1,255	79.3%
Black or African American	15	0.9%
American Indian and Alaska Native	14	0.9%
Asian	35	2.2%
Native Hawaiian and Other Pacific Islander	7	0.4%
Some other race	114	7.2%
Two or more races	143	9.0%
Hispanic or Latino (of any race)	228	14.4%

=== 2010 census ===
At the 2010 census, there were 1,307 people, 482 households and 329 families living in the city. The population density was 883.1 inhabitants per square mile (341.0/km^{2}). There were 531 housing units at an average density of 358.8 per square mile (138.5/km^{2}). The racial makeup of the city was 83.7% White, 1.5% African American, 2.4% Native American, 1.5% Asian, 6.6% from other races, and 4.2% from two or more races. Hispanic or Latino of any race were 15.8% of the population.

There were 482 households, of which 39.8% had children under the age of 18 living with them, 49.6% were married couples living together, 11.6% had a female householder with no husband present, 7.1% had a male householder with no wife present, and 31.7% were non-families. 26.3% of all households were made up of individuals, and 6.4% had someone living alone who was 65 years of age or older. The average household size was 2.71 and the average family size was 3.27.

The median age in the city was 30.6 years. 28.8% of residents were under the age of 18; 12.1% were between the ages of 18 and 24; 27.2% were from 25 to 44; 21.3% were from 45 to 64; and 10.6% were 65 years of age or older. The gender makeup of the city was 49.2% male and 50.8% female.

=== 2000 census ===
At the 2000 census, there were 960 people, 346 households and 236 families living in the city. The population density was 687.5 per square mile (264.8/km^{2}). There were 401 housing units at an average density of 287.2 per square mile (110.6/km^{2}). The racial makeup of the city was 86.15% White, 3.23% Native American, 4.17% Asian, 4.79% from other races, and 1.67% from two or more races. Hispanic or Latino of any race were 7.81% of the population.

There were 346 households, of which 39.9% had children under the age of 18 living with them, 51.2% were married couples living together, 11.3% had a female householder with no husband present, and 31.8% were non-families. 26.6% of all households were made up of individuals, and 9.2% had someone living alone who was 65 years of age or older. The average household size was 2.77 and the average family size was 3.42.

35.0% of the population were under the age of 18, 8.2% from 18 to 24, 29.0% from 25 to 44, 17.6% from 45 to 64, and 10.2% who were 65 years of age or older. The median age was 31 years. For every 100 females, there were 97.9 males. For every 100 females age 18 and over, there were 100.0 males.

The median household income was $29,297 and the median family income was $36,250. Males had a median income of $30,227 compared with $20,268 for females. The per capita income for the city was $13,497. About 13.9% of families and 18.0% of the population were below the poverty line, including 23.1% of those under age 18 and 14.9% of those age 65 or over.

== Notable residents ==
- Gale Bishop, professional basketball player
- Harry Delmar Fadden, sailor and U.S. Medal of Honor recipient
- Casey Bauman, NFL Quarterback.

== Municipal services ==
The City of Sumas provides electricity to residents and businesses purchased from the Bonneville Power Administration, as well as offering water, sewer, and analog cable service including a mix of major Seattle networks, Canadian broadcast TV, expanded cable channels, and Showtime.

== Education ==
The city is served by the Nooksack Valley School District. Nooksack Valley High School is the district's comprehensive high school.
