= Nooksack, Washington =

City in Washington, United States

Nooksack
- City
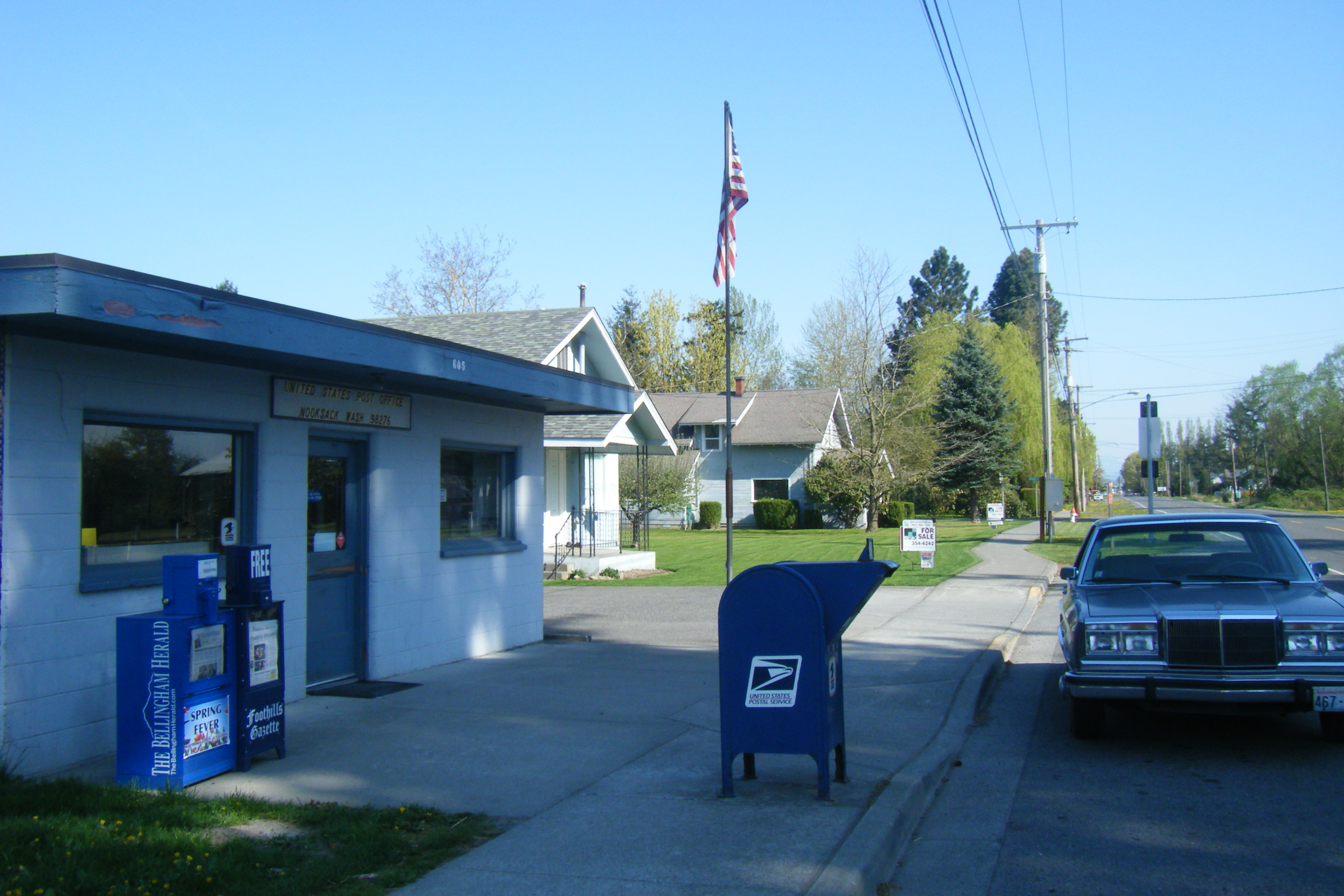
- The local post office

- Location of Nooksack, Washington
- Coordinates: 48°55′40″N 122°19′07″W
- Country: United States
- State: Washington
- County: Whatcom

Government
  - Type: Mayor–council
  - Mayor: Vacant

Area
  - Total: 0.87 sq mi (2.25 km^{2})
  - Land: 0.87 sq mi (2.25 km^{2})
  - Water: 0 sq mi (0.00 km^{2})
- Elevation: 89 ft (27 m)

Population (2020)
  - Total: 1,471
  - Density: 1,693/sq mi (653.6/km^{2})
- Time zone: UTC-8 (Pacific (PST))
  - Summer (DST): UTC-7 (PDT)
- ZIP Code: 98276
- Area code: 360, 564
- FIPS code: 53-49275
- GNIS feature ID: 2411263
- Website: cityofnooksack.com

Nooksack (/ˈnʊksæk/ NUUK-sak) is a city in Whatcom County, Washington, United States, 5 mi (8.0 km) south of the border with Canada. The population was 1,471 at the 2020 census. Despite the name, it is actually located right next to the upper stream of the Sumas River, and is 1.2 mi (1.9 km) northeast of the nearest bank of the Nooksack River.

Nooksack shares Nooksack Valley School District with the nearby Sumas and Everson. State Route 9 runs through Nooksack.

== History ==
Nooksack was officially incorporated on December 6, 1912, and experienced much growth in its early years. It had a rail station, connecting it to the national train network. However, serious fires in the town in the early 20th century caused most of the growth to halt.

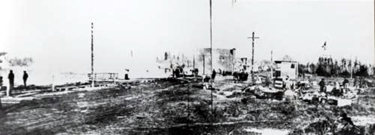
Nooksack after the fire

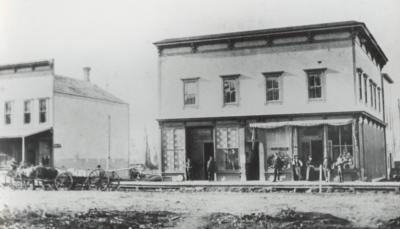
Businesses in downtown Nooksack

A merger between Nooksack and neighboring Everson into a single city was proposed by a citizens group in February 2009 with support from local officials. Names for the proposed new city included "Nooksack Valley". The proposal was dropped in May following a unanimous vote by the Nooksack City Council to not move forward based on public feedback.

Nooksack once lacked its own ZIP Code due to a decision by the U.S. Postal Service in 1992 to station the postmaster in Everson, forcing the two cities to share ZIP code 98247. As a result, the city was found to have lost sales tax revenue that was instead distributed to Everson based on the ZIP code. It now has a zip code of 98276.

== Geography ==
According to the United States Census Bureau, the city has a total area of 0.87 square miles (2.25 km^{2}), all of it land.

=== Climate ===
The climate in this area has mild differences between highs and lows, and there is adequate rainfall year-round. According to the Köppen Climate Classification system, Nooksack has a marine west coast climate, abbreviated "Cfb" on climate maps.

== Demographics ==
Historical population
Census	Pop.	Note	%±
1920	283		—
1930	293		3.5%
1940	302		3.1%
1950	323		7.0%
1960	318		−1.5%
1970	322		1.3%
1980	429		33.2%
1990	584		36.1%
2000	851		45.7%
2010	1,338		57.2%
2020	1,471		9.9%
U.S. Decennial Census

=== 2020 census ===
As of the 2020 census, Nooksack had a population of 1,471 and a median age of 33.6 years; 29.5% of residents were under the age of 18 and 13.9% of residents were 65 years of age or older.

For every 100 females there were 97.7 males, and for every 100 females age 18 and over there were 93.8 males age 18 and over.

0.0% of residents lived in urban areas, while 100.0% lived in rural areas.

There were 490 households in Nooksack, of which 42.2% had children under the age of 18 living in them. Of all households, 67.3% were married-couple households, 9.4% were households with a male householder and no spouse or partner present, and 16.9% were households with a female householder and no spouse or partner present. About 13.7% of all households were made up of individuals and 6.1% had someone living alone who was 65 years of age or older.

There were 510 housing units, of which 3.9% were vacant. The homeowner vacancy rate was 1.2% and the rental vacancy rate was 6.6%.

Racial composition as of the 2020 census
Race	Number	Percent
White	1,165	79.2%
Black or African American	4	0.3%
American Indian and Alaska Native	17	1.2%
Asian	16	1.1%
Native Hawaiian and Other Pacific Islander	3	0.2%
Some other race	107	7.3%
Two or more races	159	10.8%
Hispanic or Latino (of any race)	225	15.3%

=== 2010 census ===
As of the 2010 census, there were 1,338 people, 434 households, and 357 families residing in the city. The population density was 1,884.5 inhabitants per square mile (727.6/km^{2}). There were 457 housing units at an average density of 643.7 per square mile (248.5/km^{2}). The racial makeup of the city was 81.4% White, 0.1% African American, 2.3% Native American, 1.6% Asian, 0.1% Pacific Islander, 9.4% from other races, and 4.9% from two or more races. Hispanic or Latino of any race were 17.9% of the population.

There were 434 households, of which 49.5% had children under the age of 18 living with them, 66.4% were married couples living together, 11.3% had a female householder with no husband present, 4.6% had a male householder with no wife present, and 17.7% were non-families. 15.2% of all households were made up of individuals, and 5.5% had someone living alone who was 65 years of age or older. The average household size was 3.08 and the average family size was 3.37.

The median age in the city was 29.6 years. 31.8% of residents were under the age of 18; 9.2% were between the ages of 18 and 24; 30.8% were from 25 to 44; 20.7% were from 45 to 64; and 7.6% were 65 years of age or older. The gender makeup of the city was 49.4% male and 50.6% female.

=== 2000 census ===
At the 2000 census, there were 851 people, 276 households and 218 families residing in the city. The population density was 1,207.9 per square mile (469.4/km^{2}). There were 296 housing units at an average density of 420.2 per square mile (163.3/km^{2}). The racial makeup of the city was 91.54% White, 0.47% African American, 1.29% Native American, 1.65% Asian, 3.29% from other races, and 1.76% from two or more races. Hispanic or Latino of any race were 6.58% of the population.

There were 276 households, of which 46.7% had children under the age of 18 living with them, 65.2% were married couples living together, 8.0% had a female householder with no husband present, and 21.0% were non-families. 16.7% of all households were made up of individuals, and 3.6% had someone living alone who was 65 years of age or older. The average household size was 3.08 and the average family size was 3.54.

36.8% of the population were under the age of 18, 8.2% from 18 to 24, 29.4% from 25 to 44, 18.4% from 45 to 64, and 7.2% who were 65 years of age or older. The median age was 29 years. For every 100 females, there were 96.1 males. For every 100 females age 18 and over, there were 100.0 males.

The median household income was $44,000 and the median family income was $49,000. Males had a median income of $36,429 compared with $21,750 for females. The per capita income for the city was $16,019. About 2.3% of families and 3.2% of the population were below the poverty line, including 3.3% of those under age 18 and 9.4% of those age 65 or over.

== Education ==
Public education is provided by the Nooksack Valley School District. It operates one high school (Nooksack Valley High School), one middle school, and three elementary schools that serve Nooksack, Everson, and surrounding areas.

== Notable people ==
- Louie Gong, Native American artist and activist
- Darius and Tabitha Kinsey, notable early twentieth century photographers
- Jim Sterk, former college athletic director
