= Everson, Washington =

Everson, Washington Lummi: Kwánech
- City
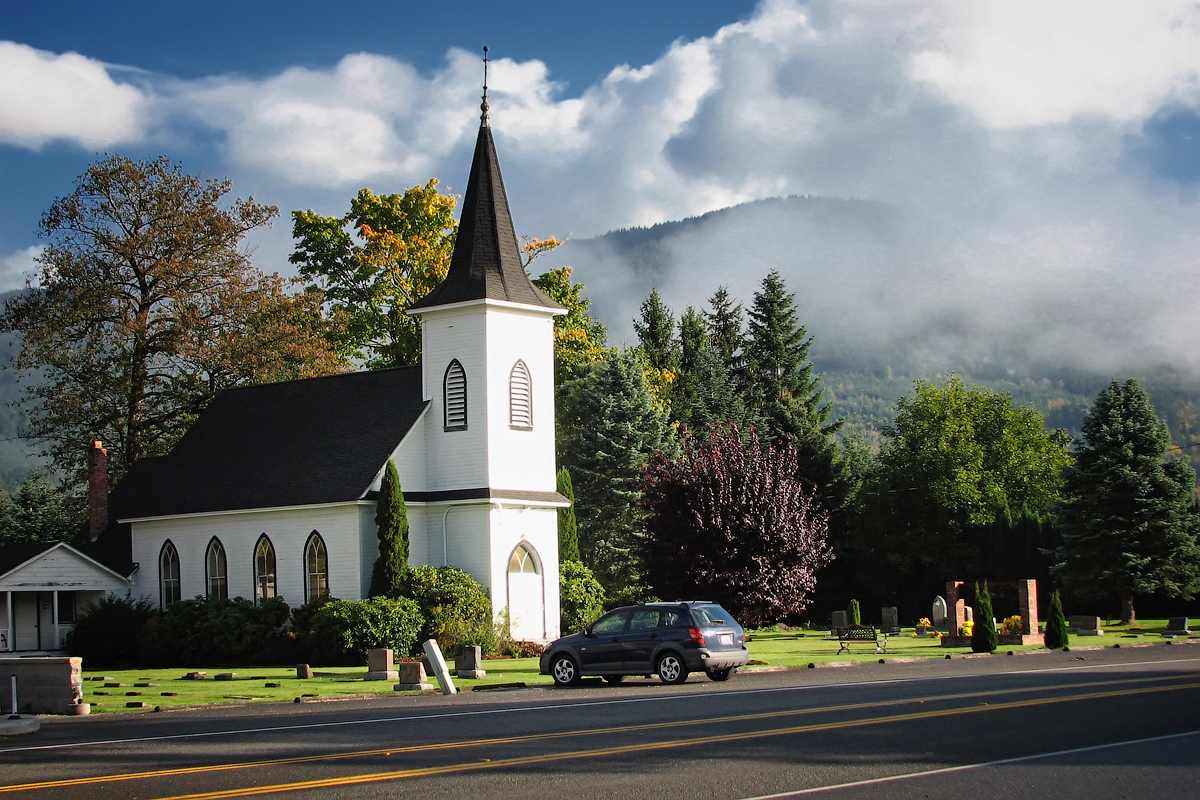
- Bethany Chapel in Everson

- Location of Everson, Washington
- Coordinates: 48°54′26″N 122°21′50″W
- Country: United States
- State: Washington
- County: Whatcom

Government
  - Type: Mayor–council
  - Mayor: John Perry

Area
  - Total: 1.37 sq mi (3.56 km^{2})
  - Land: 1.35 sq mi (3.49 km^{2})
  - Water: 0.031 sq mi (0.08 km^{2})
- Elevation: 85 ft (26 m)

Population (2020)
  - Total: 2,888
  - Density: 2,146/sq mi (828.4/km^{2})
- Demonym: Eversonian
- Time zone: UTC-8 (Pacific (PST))
  - Summer (DST): UTC-7 (PDT)
- ZIP Codes: 98247, 98276
- Area code: 360, 564
- FIPS code: 53-22745
- GNIS feature ID: 2410471
- Website: www.ci.everson.wa.us

Everson is a city in Whatcom County, Washington, United States. The population was 2,888 at the time of the 2020 census. It is the fifth largest city within the Bellingham Metropolitan Area.

Everson and the nearby city of Nooksack lie near the foothills of the Cascade mountains in Northwest Washington. Located on the banks of the Nooksack River, the businesses support the surrounding farms and logging industries. The valley is heavily influenced by Dutch settlers who established dairy farms on the fertile flood prone land. Fruit orchards and berry fields also play an important part of the town's economy.

The town's small business district provides all the basic services. There are restaurants, a pharmacy and grocery store, an auto-repair shop, and agricultural supply stores. The city park is located a half-block south off West Main Street, and Riverside Park is on the banks of the Nooksack River.

Throughout the year, the area hosts small festivals in town or in the surrounding area, including a summer festival and harvest festival.

== History ==
The site of Everson was originally home to a settlement of the Lummi nation. A major traditional village with its own large communal smokehouse, it was called Kwánech ("lots -- at the bottom," referring either to two fish traps at Popehómy or to a shallow area in the river at this site). Everson was later named to honor a local pioneer, Ever Everson, the first white settler north of the Nooksack River. Everson was officially incorporated on May 4, 1929.

In February 2009, a citizens group and local officials proposed consolidating Everson and Nooksack into a single city with a combined population of 3,819 (2010 census). The neighboring cities shared several municipal services at the time, and a combined government would provide cost savings and advantages in grant writing. The Bellingham Herald compared the merger to that of the four towns that formed Bellingham in 1903. Names for the proposed new city included "Nooksack Valley". The proposal was dropped in May following a unanimous vote by the Nooksack City Council to not move forward based on public feedback.

== Geography ==
According to the United States Census Bureau, the city has a total area of 1.26 square miles (3.26 km^{2}), of which, 1.24 square miles (3.21 km^{2}) is land and 0.02 square miles (0.05 km^{2}) is water.

== Demographics ==
Historical population
Census	Pop.	Note	%±
1930	295		—
1940	292		−1.0%
1950	345		18.2%
1960	431		24.9%
1970	633		46.9%
1980	898		41.9%
1990	1,490		65.9%
2000	2,035		36.6%
2010	2,481		21.9%
2020	2,888		16.4%
U.S. Decennial Census

=== 2020 census ===
As of the 2020 census, Everson had a population of 2,888. The median age was 32.4 years. 29.5% of residents were under the age of 18 and 12.4% of residents were 65 years of age or older. For every 100 females there were 98.4 males, and for every 100 females age 18 and over there were 95.0 males age 18 and over.

0.0% of residents lived in urban areas, while 100.0% lived in rural areas.

There were 975 households in Everson, of which 45.0% had children under the age of 18 living in them. Of all households, 59.2% were married-couple households, 12.8% were households with a male householder and no spouse or partner present, and 19.8% were households with a female householder and no spouse or partner present. About 17.0% of all households were made up of individuals and 8.2% had someone living alone who was 65 years of age or older.

There were 996 housing units, of which 2.1% were vacant. The homeowner vacancy rate was 0.0% and the rental vacancy rate was 1.8%.

Racial composition as of the 2020 census
Race	Number	Percent
White	1,930	66.8%
Black or African American	14	0.5%
American Indian and Alaska Native	59	2.0%
Asian	28	1.0%
Native Hawaiian and Other Pacific Islander	2	0.1%
Some other race	508	17.6%
Two or more races	347	12.0%
Hispanic or Latino (of any race)	871	30.2%

=== 2010 census ===
As of the 2010 census, there were 2,481 people, 819 households, and 619 families residing in the city. The population density was 2,000.8 inhabitants per square mile (772.5/km^{2}). There were 864 housing units at an average density of 696.8 per square mile (269.0/km^{2}). The racial makeup of the city was 75.3% White, 0.3% African American, 2.5% Native American, 0.7% Asian, 16.6% from other races, and 4.5% from two or more races. Hispanic or Latino of any race were 28.9% of the population.

There were 819 households, of which 45.8% had children under the age of 18 living with them, 56.7% were married couples living together, 12.0% had a female householder with no husband present, 7.0% had a male householder with no wife present, and 24.4% were non-families. 19.9% of all households were made up of individuals, and 8.1% had someone living alone who was 65 years of age or older. The average household size was 3.03 and the average family size was 3.46.

The median age in the city was 29.8 years. 32.2% of residents were under the age of 18; 10.6% were between the ages of 18 and 24; 28.9% were from 25 to 44; 20.1% were from 45 to 64; and 8.1% were 65 years of age or older. The gender makeup of the city was 48.8% male and 51.2% female.

=== 2000 census ===
As of the 2000 census, there were 2,035 people, 684 households, and 525 families residing in the city. The population density was 1,661.6 people per square mile (644.0/km^{2}). There were 727 housing units at an average density of 593.6 per square mile (230.1/km^{2}). The racial makeup of the city was 85.06% White, 0.54% African American, 2.16% Native American, 0.98% Asian, 8.01% from other races, and 3.24% from two or more races. Hispanic or Latino of any race were 18.33% of the population.

There were 684 households, out of which 46.5% had children under the age of 18 living with them, 59.9% were married couples living together, 12.0% had a female householder with no husband present, and 23.2% were non-families. 18.6% of all households were made up of individuals, and 7.0% had someone living alone who was 65 years of age or older. The average household size was 2.97 and the average family size was 3.40.

In the city, the age distribution of the population shows 34.6% under the age of 18, 8.8% from 18 to 24, 31.2% from 25 to 44, 16.6% from 45 to 64, and 8.7% who were 65 years of age or older. The median age was 30 years. For every 100 females, there were 93.3 males. For every 100 females age 18 and over, there were 90.0 males.

The median income for a household in the city was $35,313, and the median income for a family was $40,568. Males had a median income of $33,942 versus $20,547 for females. The per capita income for the city was $13,700. About 14.3% of families and 18.0% of the population were below the poverty line, including 21.4% of those under age 18 and 9.5% of those age 65 or over.

== Education ==
Public education is provided by the Nooksack Valley School District. It operates one high school (Nooksack Valley High School), one middle school, and three elementary schools that serve Nooksack, Everson, Sumas, and surrounding areas.

== Notable people ==
- Gordon Adam, member of 1936 Olympic gold medal-winning crew team
- George Bernard "Bernie" Worrell Jr. (1944–2016), American keyboardist and composer
