= Heaton (surname) =

Heaton is a habitational surname that originated in several locations in England. The name derives from Old English hēah ("high)" and tūn ("enclosure" or "settlement").

Notable people with the surname include:

- A. G. Heaton (1844–1930)
- Anne Heaton (disambiguation)
- Arthur B. Heaton (1875–1951), American architect
- Ben Heaton (born 1990), British rugby league footballer
- Bill Heaton (1918–1990), English footballer
- Bob Heaton (born 1956), American politician
- Charlie Heaton (born 1994), British actor and musician
- Chris Heaton-Harris (born 1967), British politician, Member of the European Parliament
- Chuck Heaton (1917–2008), American sports news journalist
- Dave Heaton (1941–2025), Iowa State Representative (1994–2018)
- Dave Heaton (Wisconsin politician) (born 1971), American businessman, lawyer, and politician from Wisconsin
- David Heaton (1823–1870), Congressional Representative from North Carolina
- Dennis Heaton, Canadian screenwriter
- Edward Heaton-Ellis (1868–1943), Vice-Admiral in the Royal Navy
- Eliza Putnam Heaton (1860–1919), American journalist, editor
- Ellen Heaton (1816–1894), British philanthropist and art collector
- Eric Heaton (1920–1996), English doctor of divinity
- Hannah Heaton (1721–1794), New England woman known for chronicling her experiences in the northern American royal colonies
- Harold R. Heaton (died 1940), American political cartoonist
- Henry Heaton (1846–1927), North-American amateur mathematician
- Jack Heaton (rugby union) (1912–1998), English rugby union footballer
- Jeff Heaton (born 1943), British rugby league footballer
- Joe L. Heaton (born 1951), United States federal judge
- John Heaton (disambiguation)
- Josh Heaton (born 1996), English footballer
- Kelly Heaton (born 1972), sculptor, perfumer, and owner of the Virginia Perfume Company
- Kenneth Willoughby Heaton (Aug 3, 1936-Mar 4, 2013), British/Indian surgeon who studied the effects of good on intestinal transit Times; développent of the Bristol Stool Form Scale
- Leonard D. Heaton (1902–1983), Surgeon General of the United States Army
- Marty Heaton (born 1959), former American football coach
- Mary Heaton (disambiguation), several people
- Matt Heaton (born 1993), Canadian rugby union player
- Maurice Heaton (1900–1990), Swiss-born American glass artist
- Michelle Heaton (born 1979), British pop star
- Mick Heaton (1947–1995), English footballer
- Mike Heaton (born 1966), British musician and member of the band Embrace
- Naomi Heaton, chief executive of UK real estate investment advisory London Central Portfolio Limited
- Neal Heaton (born 1960), Major League Baseball player
- Niykee Heaton (born 1994), American singer-songwriter
- Patricia Heaton (born 1958), American actress, Everybody Loves Raymond
- Paul Heaton (born 1962), British musician and songwriter
- Penny Heaton, American physician
- Peter Heaton-Jones (born 1963), British politician and journalist
- Richard Heaton, KCB British barrister and Permanent Secretary to the Ministry of Justice and Clerk of the Crown in Chancery
- Robert Heaton (1961–2004), English drummer (New Model Army)
- Robert Douglas Heaton (1873–1933), American politician
- Robert Heaton Rhodes (1815–1884), New Zealand politician
- Rodger Heaton, American attorney
- Ted Heaton (1872–1937), British diver notable for several unsuccessful attempts to swim the English Channel
- Thomas Heaton (disambiguation)
- Tim B. Heaton (born 1949), American educator and sociologist
- Timothy H. Heaton, Ph.D., American professor in archaeological geology
- Thomas Heaton (footballer, born 1897), English footballer
- Tom Heaton (born 1986), English footballer
- Tony Heaton (born 1954), British sculptor, disability rights activist and arts administrator
- Wilfred Heaton (1918–200), English composer of Brass Band music
- William Heaton (born 1979), former chief of staff for Rep. Bob Ney (R-Ohio) and a supporting figure in the Abramoff scandal
- William Edward Heaton (1875–1941), English recipient of the Victoria Cross

== See also ==
- HeatoN, pseudonym of Emil Christensen (born 1984), Swedish Counter-Strike player
- Heaton (disambiguation)
