= Heaton =

Heaton may refer to:

== People ==
- Heaton (surname)
- Sir Heaton Rhodes (1861–1956), New Zealand politician and lawyer
- HeatoN, pseudonym of Emil Christensen (born 1984), Swedish Counter-Strike player

== Places ==
=== Great Britain ===
- Heaton, Greater Manchester, district in the west of Bolton, England
- Heaton (Havering ward), London
- Heaton, Lancaster, in Heaton-with-Oxcliffe, near Lancaster, England
- Heaton, Newcastle upon Tyne, area in the east-end of Newcastle upon Tyne, Tyne and Wear, England
- Heaton, West Yorkshire, a village and a ward in Bradford, England
- The Four Heatons, four suburbs of Stockport, Greater Manchester, England
  - Heaton Chapel
  - Heaton Moor
  - Heaton Mersey
  - Heaton Norris
- Heaton, Staffordshire
- Heaton Castle (anciently Heton), in the parish of Cornhill-on-Tweed, Northumberland, seat of the Grey family
- Heaton Park, large park in Manchester, England

=== United States ===
- Heaton, Arizona
- Heaton, North Carolina
- Heaton, North Dakota

== See also ==
- Heatons, an Irish department store
