= Trevor Mundel =

South African scientist

- Education: University of the Witwatersrand, University of Chicago
- Scientific career
- Fields: Public Health
- Workplaces: Bill & Melinda Gates Foundation
- Thesis: A Model of Edge Detection in the Primary Visual Cortex
- Doctoral advisor: Jack Cowan

Trevor Mundel is a South African doctor and scientist and the president of the Bill & Melinda Gates Foundation Global Health Program. He is known for his role in the launch of the Coalition for Epidemic Preparedness Innovations and the global response to the COVID-19 pandemic.

== Education and Research ==
Mundel earned his bachelor's and medical degree from the University of the Witwatersrand where he studied anatomy under Phillip Tobias. He was a Rhodes Scholar and studied mathematics, logic, and philosophy at Oxford University. He earned his Ph.D. in mathematics in 1996 at the University of Chicago studying neural networks advised by Jack Cowan before doing his residency in neurology and clinical electrophysiology at the University of Chicago Medical Center.

Mundel started his industrial career at Parke-Davis in pharmaceutical R&D before moving to early phase development at Novartis. He rose to the Global Head of Development at Novartis Pharma. Mundel was selected as the president of the Global Health Program replacing Tachi Yamada in 2011. In 2018, the Bill & Melinda Gates Medical Research Institute was created as an offshoot of the Gates Foundation and headed by Penny Heaton.

== Personal life ==
Mundel was born and raised in South Africa during the apartheid. He has three children.
