= Golston =

Golston is a surname. Notable people with the surname include:

- Allan Golston (fl. 1993), American accountant and businessman
- Chauncey Golston (born 1998), American football player
- Kedric Golston (born 1983), American football player
