= Naomi Heaton =

British businesswoman

Naomi Heaton is chief executive of UK real estate investment advisory London Central Portfolio Limited. Dubbed "property queen" by the London Evening Standard, Naomi set up one of the first buying agents in the UK and was a pioneer of residential property funds targeting central London's rental sector, including the UK's first sharia-compliant residential fund.

== Early career ==
Naomi Heaton joined advertising agency Leo Burnett after graduating from Oxford University in 1977 with an MA(Hons) in Human Sciences. After moving to Saatchi & Saatchi in 1982 she became a board director in 1984. A further move to Young & Rubicam saw her appointed as main board director from 1985–1986.

== Founding London Central Portfolio and the LCP group of companies ==
Naomi bought her first property—a garden flat in Camden Town—at age 26 and began buying, renovating and selling property on for profit as a hobby while she pursued her advertising career. Feeling that there were no real challenges left for her in advertising, and recognising a gap in the market for assisting investors like herself in the London real estate market, she established London Central Portfolio (LCP) in 1989 to provide a full asset management service including property finding, refurbishment and lettings. She is director and chief executive, as well as holding directorships on further LCP group companies established in 2013–2014 and a number of listed property funds.

== Other activities ==
Naomi is considered a property investment expert and has appeared on international media including BBC Radio 4's Today Programme, BBC Radio 5 Live, Sky News and Reuters. In 2017 she was named as one of London's top 50 CEOs by Citywealth, as London's top buying agent by Spear's, and as one of Debrett's people of today. She regularly speaks at real estate and Islamic finance conferences.

As of 2018 Naomi lives in London with her husband Jonathan Waxman, professor of oncology at Imperial College and founder and lifetime president of Prostate Cancer UK. Her home, a Nash stucco terrace near Regent's Park, has been featured in the London Evening Standard, Homes & Antiques Magazine, and The London Magazine; her interiors expertise has also appeared in the London Evening Standard.

== See also ==
London Central Portfolio Limited
