= Agriculture, Nutrition and Health Academy =

British global organisation

- Formation: 2015; 11 years ago
- Founded at: London, United Kingdom
- Legal status: 501(c)(6) trade association
- Purpose: To build an interdisciplinary community to share innovative research in agriculture and food systems
- Coordinates: 41.879750°N 87.638719°W
- Website: www.anh-academy.org

The Agriculture, Nutrition and Health (ANH) Academy is a global community of researchers, practitioners, and policymakers working on agriculture and food systems for improved nutrition and health. With over 9,000 members in over 145 countries, the organisation claims to have best researchers and other experts in the world.

== History ==
The community was co-funded with United Kingdom Aid from the UK government and the Bill and Melinda Gates Foundation. It is led by the London School of Tropical Hygiene and Medicine (LSHTM) in partnership with Tufts University and other international organisations.

== Initiatives ==
The academy, prior to its founding, the community was meant to share innovative research in agriculture and food systems for improved nutrition and health, as well as stimulating the development and harmonisation of new researches. It also ensures the facilitation of the uptake of evidence in policies and programmes in agriculture and food systems for healthy, sustainable and equitable nutrition.

=== Academy Week ===
The Academy Week comprises a series of annual events with an intention of bringing together the community of researchers, practitioners and policymakers working at the intersection of agriculture, food systems, nutrition and health. The main objective is to boost knowledge exchange, innovation and learning around interdisciplinary research. The academy has two areas that are, learning laboratories and a research conference. The sixth successful Academy Week was held in Ethiopia in 2016, Nepal in 2017, and Ghana in 2018, as well as India in 2019. However, the last two Academy Weeks (2020 and 2021) were held online due to the COVID-19 pandemic. The 2020 and 2021 Academy Weeks were online that were organized in collaboration with Malawi and Pakistan institutions. In 2022, it was held in collaboration with the Southern Africa Food Lab and University of Stellenbosch in South Africa.

=== Group Works ===
The group works ensures accelerating of research by sharing experience and synthesizing disparate research methods, metrics and approaches.

=== Events ===
In June 2023, 400 scientists, policymakers, famers and practitioners from 35 countries met at the Bingu International Conference Centre in Malawi for the eighth Agriculture, Nutrition and Health Academy Week where experts share innovative ideas to inform policies designed to address world development challenges.
