= Bill & Melinda Gates Medical Research Institute =

US health organization

- The Bill & Melinda Gates Medical Research Institute
- Established: January 2018; 8 years ago
- Founders: Bill Gates; Melinda French Gates
- Founded at: Cambridge, Massachusetts
- Type: Nonprofit
- Purpose: Medical research
- Location: Cambridge, Massachusetts, United States
- Region served: Global
- Key people: Emilio A. Emini (CEO); Michael Dunne (CMO)
- Parent organization: Bill & Melinda Gates Foundation
- Budget: US$100 million (2018)
- Funding: Bill & Melinda Gates Foundation
- Endowment: $273 million (2018)
- Website: www.gatesmri.org

The Gates Medical Research Institute (Gates MRI; previously Bill & Melinda Gates Medical Research Institute) is a non-profit biotechnology organization founded with the aim of bringing technologies and strategies to bear on the main health problems of the poor in low-income countries. The Gates MRI was organized as a subsidiary of the Bill & Melinda Gates Foundation who funded it with a $273 million 4-year grant.

== Activities ==
Upon its founding, the organization said it would focus on the early stages of research for cures and treatments before working with larger companies for large-scale production once proof of effectiveness had been established. The Gates MRI has been described as a "nonprofit biotechnology company". According to Forbes, the organization focuses on developing treatments for diseases such as malaria, tuberculosis, and diseases which cause diarrhea. Combined, these three diseases alone cause five deaths every minute. Chief executive officer Emilio A. Emini said the organization focuses in particular on diseases that are most present in low and middle income countries, where investment in treatments by large pharmaceutical companies is "limited and insufficient."

== History ==
Gates MRI was founded in January 2018 in Cambridge, Massachusetts, as a nonprofit offshoot of the Bill & Melinda Gates Foundation.

=== Projects ===
Among its first steps toward product development, Gates MRI announced plans to try and replicate earlier clinical findings that showed revaccinating adolescents against tuberculosis with the Bacillus Calmette–Guérin (BCG) vaccine could give them added protection. This vaccine is typically given to children when they are infants, but Phase 2 data suggests that also vaccinating at-risk adolescents may confer added preventative effect. No commercial firm has yet been interested in testing this approach to extending tuberculosis immunization. As of May 2022, that research was still in clinical trials, expected to conclude in 2026.

In 2019, Gates MRI expanded the scope of its mission to include maternal, newborn, and child health (MN2CH), in part driven by the health needs in these groups. In 2019 alone, worldwide 2.4 million children died during their first month of life, while more than 800 women die every day from preventable causes related to pregnancy and childbirth.

Since then, the group has partnered with several others to explore treatments for various diseases. In 2020, Gates MRI partnered with Evotec, Johnson & Johnson, Otsuka Pharmaceutical, GSK plc, and TB Alliance to create the Project to Accelerate New Treatments for Tuberculosis (PAN-TB), a group working on developing new treatment regimens for tuberculosis. Gates MRI licensed the M72 TB vaccine from GSK in 2020 and began an observational epidemiology study on latent TB infection in preparation for Phase III trials.

In 2021, the Gates MRI partnered with the biotechnology firm Atreca to license a monoclonal antibody treatment for malaria. In August 2022, plans for Phase II trials for a new tuberculosis treatment developed by PAN-TB were announced. Gates MRI partnered with Merck Group in 2022 to further develop drugs to treat drug-resistant strains of TB.

=== Leadership ===
The organization was led from its founding until 2021 by Penny Heaton. She was succeeded by Emilio A. Emini. Emini retired in June, 2024 and was succeeded by Patrice Matchaba. Gates MRI is led by Matchaba and chief medical officer Michael Dunne.
