= Thomas Heaton =

Thomas Heaton may refer to:

- Thomas Heaton (footballer, born 1897), English footballer
- Thomas H. Heaton (born 1951), American seismologist
- Tom Heaton (born 1986), English football goalkeeper
