= Gates Foundation =

Private foundation founded by Bill and Melinda Gates

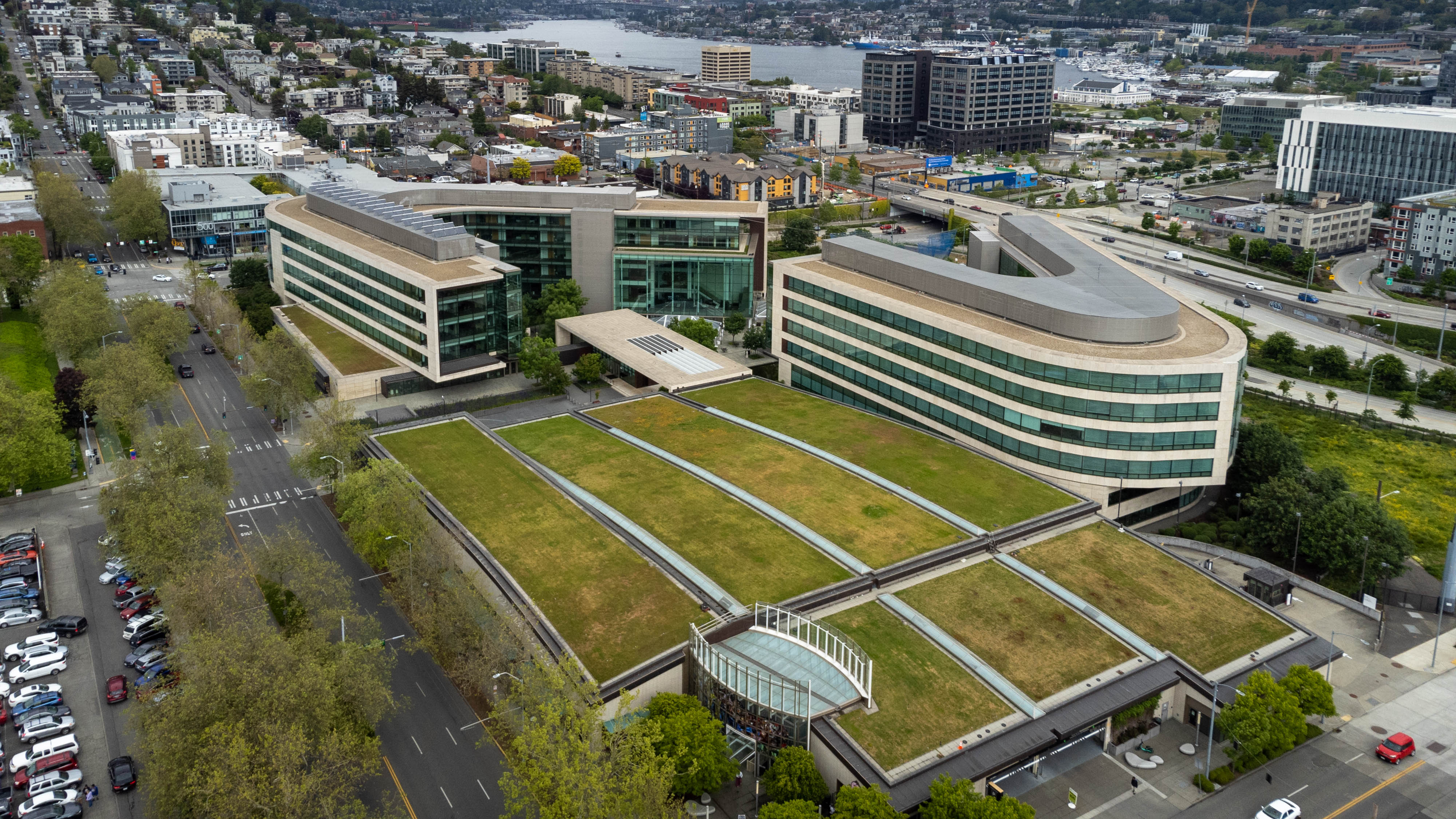
- The Gates Foundation headquarters in 2022
- Formation: 2000; 26 years ago
- Founders: Bill Gates; Melinda French Gates
- Type: Non-operating private foundation
- Legal status: 501(c)(3) organization
- Purpose: Healthcare, education, fighting poverty
- Headquarters: Seattle, Washington, U.S.
- Coordinates: 47°37′25″N 122°20′44″W
- Region served: Worldwide
- Method: Donations, grants
- Key people: Bill Gates (chair); Mark Suzman (CEO)
- Revenue: $3.4 billion (2025)
- Expenses: $8.1 billion (2025)
- Endowment: $89 billion (2025)
- Employees: 2,215 (2025)
- Website: gatesfoundation.org
- Formerly called: Bill & Melinda Gates Foundation (2000–2024); William H. Gates Foundation; Gates Learning Foundation

The Gates Foundation (Note: Formerly the William H. Gates Foundation, the Gates Learning Foundation and the Bill & Melinda Gates Foundation) is an American private foundation founded by Bill Gates and Melinda French Gates. Based in Seattle, Washington, it was launched in 2000 and is reported to be the fifth-wealthiest charitable foundation in the world, holding $91 billion in assets as of December 31, 2025. The primary stated goals of the foundation are to enhance healthcare and reduce extreme poverty across the world, and to expand educational opportunities and access to information technology in the United States. Key individuals of the foundation include Warren Buffett (who resigned as a Gates Foundation trustee in 2021 and officially ended his partnership with the foundation in 2026), chief executive officer Mark Suzman, and Michael Larson.

The scale of the foundation and the way it seeks to apply business techniques to giving makes it one of the leaders in venture philanthropy, though the foundation itself notes that the philanthropic role has limitations. In 2007, its founders were ranked as the second most generous philanthropists in the U.S., behind Warren Buffett. As of 2018, Bill Gates and Melinda French Gates had donated around $36 billion to the foundation. Since its founding, the foundation has endowed and supported a broad range of social, health, and education developments, including the establishment of the Gates Cambridge Scholarships at Cambridge University.

== History ==
In 1994, the foundation was formed as the William H. Gates Foundation. In May 2002, the foundation purchased stocks in pharmaceutical companies Johnson & Johnson, Merck, and Pfizer. On June 15, 2006, Gates announced his plans to transition out of a day-to-day role with Microsoft, effective July 31, 2008, to allow him to devote more time to working with the foundation. The first CEO of the foundation was Patty Stonesifer, who stepped down in 2008.

In 2005, Bill Gates and Melinda French Gates, along with the Irish rock musician Bono, were named by Time as Persons of the Year 2005 for their outstanding charitable work. In the case of the Gateses, the work referenced was that of the Gates Foundation. On May 12, 2008, it was announced that Jeff Raikes would replace Stonesifer as the CEO of the foundation.

The Gates Foundation announced in January 2005 that it would build its headquarters on 12 acres (4.9 ha) adjacent to the Seattle Center in Downtown Seattle. The foundation purchased the property for $50.4 million from the Seattle municipal government, which would help build a 1,000-stall public parking garage and assist with cleanup of the land, which had been used as a Metro Transit bus base. The two-building campus opened in June 2011 at a cost of $500 million and was designed by NBBJ. The design was awarded LEED Platinum status for its environmentally friendly features, including a living roof, a rainwater retention pool, and a rooftop solar array. The campus also features the large-scale fiber sculpture Impatient Optimist by artist Janet Echelman, installed in the public plaza outside the main building.

In 2010, the foundation's founders started the Commission on Education of Health Professionals for the 21st Century, entitled "Transforming education to strengthen health systems in an interdependent world."

A 2011 survey of grantees found that many believed the foundation did not make its goals and strategies clear and sometimes did not understand those of the grantees; that the foundation's decision-making and grant-making procedures were too opaque; and that its communications could be more consistent and responsive. The foundation's response was to improve the clarity of its explanations, make "orientation calls" to grantees upon awarding grants, tell grantees who their foundation contact is, give timely feedback when they receive a grantee report, and establish a way for grantees to provide anonymous or attributed feedback to the foundation. The foundation also launched a podcast series.

In October 2013, the Gates Foundation announced that it would join the International Aid Transparency Initiative.

In December 2013, Susan Desmond-Hellmann, president of product development for Genentech before its acquisition by Roche Pharmaceuticals, was announced as the next CEO of the Gates Foundation. She replaced Jeff Raikes in May 2014.

In February 2014, Hillary Clinton launched a partnership between the foundation and the Clinton Foundation to gather and study data on the progress of women and girls around the world since the 1995 United Nations Fourth World Conference on Women in Beijing. This is called "No Ceilings: The Full Participation Project".

In October 2019, the Gates Foundation partnered with the World Economic Forum to host the tabletop exercise called Event 201 in New York City.

In February 2020, Gates Foundation CEO Desmond-Hellmann was replaced "for health and family reasons" by Mark Suzman.

As early as 2012, there were reports that the Gates Foundation was acting as a fund aggregator for wealthy donors—the name recognition associated with the foundation caused more money to be placed than when under anonymous control. This was particularly useful during the COVID-19 pandemic because the foundation already knew which organizations were working in the field and able to receive funds.

When President Trump threatened to defund the WHO in summer 2020 over concerns that it was too "deferential" to the Chinese Communist Party, because the Gates Foundation constituted at that time the second-ranked contributor to the WHO, concerns were raised in the charity and academic sector that the Gates Foundation might conceivably bias the WHO in the pursuit of its ideology. In the most timely accounting period, the foundation provided 45% of the WHO's NGO funds, or in other words 12% of the total operating expenditure of the WHO.

It was revealed after the fact that the Gates Foundation had contributed US$1.553 billion to the GAVI over the five years (from 2016 to 2020). The foundation was the number two ranked contributor. At the Global Vaccine Summit in June 2020, the foundation pledged $1.6 billion (or just under 20% of the total) for the subsequent five years.

In June 2021, as Bill and Melinda Gates finalized their divorce, founding Gates Foundation trustee Warren Buffett would officially step as a trustee for the foundation.

In May 2022, the Gates Foundation announced the commitment of $125 million to aid in ending the acute phase of the COVID-19 pandemic and to aid in preparing for future pandemics. In total, since the start of the COVID-19 pandemic the Gates Foundation has committed more than $2 billion to COVID-19 response efforts. In 2015, it co-funded a community known as Agriculture, Nutrition and Health Academy in partnership with the United Kingdom Aid from the UK government.

In July 2021, the foundation agreed on a back-up plan in the event that its co-chairs could not work together due to their recent divorce. The deal gave Bill and Melinda a two-year trial, after which Melinda could resign from the organization and receive personal resources from her ex-husband for her own charity work. On May 13, 2024, Melinda Gates resigned as co-chair of the foundation, to be effective June 7, 2024. The foundation was renamed to the Gates Foundation in January 2025, with Bill Gates as the sole chairman.

The New York Times wrote in August 2025 that the Gates Foundation had "quietly ceased backing" a network of organizations associated with Arabella Advisors, a for-profit consulting company that serves as the hub of a politically liberal "dark money" network. The foundation specifically said that it would cease "making grants to nonprofit funds administered by the consulting firm Arabella Advisors". According to the report, the Gates Foundation had been a very significant donor to Arabella-allied the New Venture Fund and the Sixteen Thirty Fund. Over a sixteen-year period, the Gates Foundation had disbursed or pledged about $450 million to Arabella Advisors-associated organizations.

=== Warren Buffett donations ===
In June 2006, Warren Buffett pledged to give the foundation approximately 10 million Berkshire Hathaway Class B shares (then valued at $3,071 each, before a 50–1 stock split in 2010) spread over multiple years through annual contributions, with the first year's donation of 500,000 shares being worth approximately $1.5 billion. Buffett set conditions so that these contributions do not simply increase the foundation's endowment, but effectively work as a matching contribution, doubling the foundation's annual giving. Bloomberg News noted, "Buffett's gift came with three conditions for the Bill & Melinda Gates Foundation: Bill or Melinda Gates must be alive and active in its administration; it must continue to qualify as a charity; and each year it must give away an amount equal to the previous year's Berkshire gift, plus an additional amount equal to 5 percent of net assets. Buffett gave the foundation two years to abide by the third requirement." The Gates Foundation received 5% (500,000) of the shares in July 2006 and was to receive 5% of the remaining earmarked shares in July of each following year (475,000 in 2007, 451,250 in 2008).

In July 2018, Buffett announced another donation of his company's Class B stock, this time worth $2 billion, to the Gates Foundation.

Despite maintaining ties to the foundation until 2026, Buffet was acknowledged to have had a more distant relationship from the Gates Foundation in the time following the divorce of Bill and Melinda Gates in 2021.

In June 2024, Buffett clarified the Bill & Melinda Gates Foundation would not receive any more money after he died. While this did not prevent him from making any further donations while he is still alive, the recipients of his fortune upon his death will be decided unanimously by his three children.

In July 2025, Buffet would donate a majority of $6 billion in Berkshire Hathaway shares to the Gates Foundation.

By the start of 2026, however, Buffett would cease being a donor to the foundation, and officially ended his decades long partnership with the Gates Foundation in July 2026.

At the time he had severed ties, Buffet was estimated to have donated $48 billion to the Gates Foundation.

=== Lifespan ===
In October 2006, the Bill & Melinda Gates Foundation was split into two entities: the Bill & Melinda Gates Foundation Trust, which manages the endowment assets and the Bill & Melinda Gates Foundation, which "... conducts all operations and grantmaking work, and it is the entity from which all grants are made". Also announced was the decision to spend all of the foundation's resources within 50 years after Bill's and Melinda's deaths. This was later lowered to within 20 years of their deaths. This would close the Bill & Melinda Gates Foundation Trust and effectively end the Bill & Melinda Gates Foundation. In the 2006 announcement, it was reiterated that Warren Buffett "... has stipulated that the proceeds from the Berkshire Hathaway shares he still owns at death are to be used for philanthropic purposes within 10 years after his estate has been settled".

In May 2025, Bill Gates announced that the foundation will cease operations on December 31, 2045.

The plan to close the Foundation Trust is in contrast to most large charitable foundations that have no set closure date. This is intended to lower administrative costs over the years of the Foundation Trust's life and ensure that the Foundation Trust does not fall into a situation where the vast majority of its expenditures are on administrative costs, including salaries, with only token amounts contributed to charitable causes.

== Activities ==
=== Program areas and grant database ===
To maintain its status as a charitable foundation, the Bill & Melinda Gates Foundation must donate funds equal to at least five percent of its assets each year. As of April 2014, the foundation is organized into four program areas under chief executive officer Susan Desmond-Hellmann, who "sets strategic priorities, monitors results, and facilitates relationships with key partners":

- Global Development Division
- Global Health Division
- United States Division
- Global Policy & Advocacy Division
- Global Growth & Opportunity Division

The foundation maintains an online database of grants.

=== Open access policy ===
In November 2014, the Gates Foundation announced that they were adopting an open-access (OA) policy for publications and data, "to enable the unrestricted access and reuse of all peer-reviewed published research funded by the foundation, including any underlying data sets". Its terms have been called the most stringent among similar OA policies. As of January 1, 2015, their Open Access policy is effective for all new agreements. In March 2017, it was confirmed that the open access policy, Gates Open Research, would be based on the same initiative launched in 2016 by Wellcome Trust in their Wellcome Open Research policy launched in partnership with F1000 Research.

The Gates Foundation supported Our World in Data, one of the world's largest open-access publications. Bill Gates called the publication his "favorite website".

In 2024, the Gates Foundation announced a "preprint-centric" open access policy, and their intention to stop paying article-processing charges.

=== Funds for grants in developing countries ===
The following table lists the Gates Foundation's committed funding as recorded in their International Aid Transparency Initiative (IATI) publications. The foundation announced in October 2013 that it would join the IATI. The IATI publications only include a subset of Gates Foundation grants (mainly excluding grants to developed countries), and contain few grants before 2009 (which are entirely excluded from the table). The foundation states on the IATI Registry site that "reporting starts from 2009 and excludes grants related to our US programs and grants that if published could harm our employees, grantees, partners, or the beneficiaries of our work".

| | Committed funding ($ millions) | | | | | | | |
| DAC 5 Digit Sector | 2009 | 2010 | 2011 | 2012 | 2013 | 2014 | 2015 | Sum |
|---|---|---|---|---|---|---|---|---|
| Infectious disease control | 256.9 | 720.3 | 462.8 | 528.7 | 1248.3 | 1271.8 | 1097.5 | 5586.4 |
| Malaria control | 324.5 | 101.7 | 133.6 | 75.5 | 302.4 | 377.6 | 140.8 | 1456.1 |
| STD control including HIV/AIDS | 175.5 | 26.9 | 291.4 | 199.7 | 184.4 | 264.4 | 165.7 | 1308.0 |
| Tuberculosis control | 69.2 | 211.1 | 59.5 | 273.9 | 135.3 | 100.1 | 244.8 | 1094.0 |
| Reproductive health care | 173.8 | 66.8 | 77.4 | 165.2 | 84.9 | 207.6 | 130.0 | 905.8 |
| Agricultural research | 84.7 | 27.8 | 196.2 | 192.8 | 207.1 | 14.7 | 83.9 | 807.2 |
| Family planning | 104.5 | 21.2 | 21.4 | 49.3 | 165.0 | 145.8 | 181.7 | 688.9 |
| Health policy and administrative management | 119.3 | 14.3 | 145.7 | 75.5 | 61.1 | 113.4 | 130.3 | 659.5 |
| Agricultural development | 5.2 | 30.0 | 0.0 | 35.0 | 0.0 | 325.1 | 86.1 | 481.3 |
| Agricultural policy and administrative management | 72.9 | 30.0 | 77.5 | 77.1 | 86.2 | 19.7 | 96.9 | 460.3 |
| Promotion of development awareness | 47.2 | 45.0 | 35.5 | 41.7 | 124.4 | 61.7 | 80.7 | 436.2 |
| Basic health care | 22.3 | 23.9 | 43.7 | 73.2 | 1.7 | 45.6 | 206.3 | 416.7 |
| Basic nutrition | 19.2 | 15.7 | 40.9 | 51.5 | 63.7 | 55.9 | 148.2 | 395.2 |
| Basic sanitation | 10.1 | 34.9 | 82.9 | 74.9 | 59.1 | 48.7 | 64.9 | 375.5 |
| Financial policy and administrative management | 29.0 | 18.4 | 9.8 | 8.9 | 70.1 | 32.9 | 53.4 | 222.5 |
| Other | 487.5 | 273.8 | 2208.9 | 260.2 | 332.1 | 433.3 | 2195.7 | 6191.5 |
| Total | 2002 | 1662 | 3887 | 2183 | 3126 | 3518 | 5107 | 21485 |

The following table lists the top receiving organizations to which the Bill & Melinda Gates Foundation has committed funding, between 2009 and 2015. The table again only includes grants recorded in the Gates Foundation's IATI publications.

| Organization | Amount ($ millions) |
|---|---|
| GAVI | 3,152.8 |
| World Health Organization | 1,535.1 |
| The Global Fund to Fight AIDS, Tuberculosis and Malaria | 777.6 |
| PATH | 635.2 |
| United States Fund for UNICEF | 461.1 |
| The Rotary Foundation of Rotary International | 400.1 |
| International Bank for Reconstruction and Development | 340.0 |
| Global Alliance for TB Drug Development | 338.4 |
| Medicines for Malaria Venture | 334.1 |
| PATH Vaccine Solutions | 333.4 |
| UNICEF Headquarters | 277.6 |
| Johns Hopkins University | 265.4 |
| Aeras | 227.6 |
| Clinton Health Access Initiative Inc | 199.5 |
| International Development Association | 174.7 |
| CARE | 166.2 |
| World Health Organization Nigeria Country Office | 166.1 |
| Agence française de développement | 165.0 |
| Centro Internacional de Mejoramiento de Maíz y Trigo | 153.1 |
| Cornell University | 146.7 |
| Alliance for a Green Revolution in Africa | 146.4 |
| United Nations Foundation | 143.0 |
| University of Washington Foundation | 138.2 |
| Foundation for the National Institutes of Health | 136.2 |
| Emory University | 123.2 |
| University of California San Francisco | 123.1 |
| Population Services International | 122.5 |
| University of Oxford | 117.8 |
| International Food Policy Research Institute | 110.7 |
| International Institute of Tropical Agriculture | 104.8 |

According to the OECD, the Bill & Melinda Gates Foundation provided US$4.1 billion for development in 2019.

== Financials ==
The foundation explains on its website that its trustees divided the organization into two entities: the Bill & Melinda Gates Foundation and the Bill & Melinda Gates Foundation Trust. The foundation section, based in Seattle, US, "focuses on improving health and alleviating extreme poverty", and its trustees are currently Bill and Melinda Gates; Warren Buffett announced his resignation as a trustee on June 23, 2021. The trust section manages "the investment assets and transfer proceeds to the foundation as necessary to achieve the foundation's charitable goals"—it holds the assets of Bill and Melinda Gates, who are the sole trustees, and receives contributions from Buffett.

The foundation posts its audited financial statements and 990-PF forms on the "Financials" section of its website as they become available. At the end of 2023, the foundation registered a cash sum of $194,354,000, and net assets of $71,290,995,000 (of which 99.84% are unrestricted).

=== Trust investments ===
As of 30 June 2026, according to documents filed with the U.S. Securities and Exchange Commission, the trust owned the following investments (over 155 million shares) worth a total of over $34 billion:

| Company | Shares | Value | Portfolio | Total |
|---|---|---|---|---|
| Berkshire Hathaway (Class B) | 14,689,844 | $7,350,651,000 | 21.35% | 82.81% |
| Caterpillar Inc. | 6,353,614 | $6,765,964,000 | 19.65% | 82.81% |
| Canadian National Railway | 51,826,786 | $6,179,826,000 | 17.95% | 82.81% |
| Waste Management | 26,720,744 | $5,955,519,000 | 17.30% | 82.81% |
| John Deere | 3,557,378 | $2,256,552,000 | 6.56% | 82.81% |
| Ecolab | 5,218,044 | $1,453,799,000 | 4.22% | 12.09% |
| Walmart | 8,390,477 | $950,305,000 | 2.76% | 12.09% |
| FedEx | 2,384,362 | $746,615,000 | 2.17% | 12.09% |
| Coca-Cola FEMSA | 6,214,719 | $660,314,000 | 1.92% | 12.09% |
| Home Depot | 1,000,000 | $352,680,000 | 1.02% | 12.09% |
| Waste Connections | 2,039,175 | $339,910,000 | 0.99% | 5.10% |
| Madison Square Garden Sports | 592,406 | $238,052,000 | 0.69% | 5.10% |
| Fedex Freight Holding | 1,192,181 | $180,019,000 | 0.52% | 5.10% |
| Coupang | 9,248,045 | $160,639,000 | 0.47% | 5.10% |
| West Pharmaceutical Services | 444,500 | $159,576,000 | 0.46% | 5.10% |
| AB InBev | 1,703,000 | $140,327,000 | 0.41% | 5.10% |
| Paccar | 1,000,000 | $120,120,000 | 0.35% | 5.10% |
| Schrödinger | 6,981,664 | $113,452,000 | 0.33% | 5.10% |
| McDonald's | 334,900 | $90,527,000 | 0.26% | 5.10% |
| Danaher | 373,000 | $71,049,000 | 0.21% | 5.10% |
| Kraft Heinz | 2,472,600 | $58,403,000 | 0.17% | 5.10% |
| Hormel Foods | 2,085,290 | $51,757,000 | 0.15% | 5.10% |
| On Holding | 500,000 | $17,710,000 | 0.05% | 5.10% |
| Veralto | 124,333 | $11,026,000 | 0.03% | 5.10% |
| 24 companies | 155,447,062 | $34,424,792,000 | 100% | 100% |

Over almost 21 years, the Foundation held Microsoft shares as a part of its portfolio only during the following two periods – 2017 (Q2) to 2019 (Q1) and 2021 (Q3) to 2025 (Q4) – a total of 6.5 years.

==== Trust assets (2006-2026) ====
Data shown is for each year-end, apart from 2026 which shows current status at the end of the second fiscal quarter.

| Year | Assets | Change | |
|---|---|---|---|
| 2006 | $6.6 B | – | – |
| 2007 | $10.1 B | ▲$3.5 B (+53.0%) | ▲$12.4 B (+187.9%) |
| 2008 | $9.1 B | ▼$1.0 B (-9.9%) | ▲$12.4 B (+187.9%) |
| 2009 | $10.5 B | ▲$1.4 B (+15.4%) | ▲$12.4 B (+187.9%) |
| 2010 | $15.1 B | ▲$4.6 B (+43.8%) | ▲$12.4 B (+187.9%) |
| 2011 | $15.3 B | ▲$0.2 B (+1.3%) | ▲$12.4 B (+187.9%) |
| 2012 | $16.8 B | ▲$1.5 B (+9.8%) | ▲$12.4 B (+187.9%) |
| 2013 | $20.1 B | ▲$3.3 B (+19.6%) | ▲$12.4 B (+187.9%) |
| 2014 | $20.0 B | ▼$0.1 B (-0.5%) | ▲$12.4 B (+187.9%) |
| 2015 | $16.7 B | ▼$3.3 B (-16.5%) | ▲$12.4 B (+187.9%) |
| 2016 | $19.0 B | ▲$2.3 B (+13.8%) | ▲$12.4 B (+187.9%) |
| 2017 | $26.5 B | ▲$7.5 B (+39.5%) | ▲$15.4 B (+81.1%) |
| 2018 | $21.9 B | ▼$4.6 B (-17.4%) | ▲$15.4 B (+81.1%) |
| 2019 | $21.4 B | ▼$0.5 B (-2.3%) | ▲$15.4 B (+81.1%) |
| 2020 | $22.3 B | ▲$0.9 B (+4.2%) | ▲$15.4 B (+81.1%) |
| 2021 | $23.0 B | ▲$0.7 B (+3.1%) | ▲$15.4 B (+81.1%) |
| 2022 | $35.7 B | ▲$12.7 B (+55.2%) | ▲$15.4 B (+81.1%) |
| 2023 | $42.3 B | ▲$6.6 B (+18.5%) | ▲$15.4 B (+81.1%) |
| 2024 | $42.0 B | ▼$0.3 B (-0.7%) | ▲$15.4 B (+81.1%) |
| 2025 | $35.4 B | ▼$6.6 B (-15.7%) | ▲$15.4 B (+81.1%) |
| 2026 | $34.4 B | ▼$1.0 B (-2.8%) | ▲$15.4 B (+81.1%) |

== Global development division ==
Christopher Elias leads the foundation's efforts to combat extreme poverty through grants as president of the Global Development Program.

In March 2006, the foundation announced a $5 million grant for the International Justice Mission (IJM), a human rights organization based in Washington, D.C. to work in the area of sex trafficking. The official announcement explained that the grant would allow the IJM to "create a replicable model for combating sex trafficking and slavery" that would involve the opening of an office in a region with high rates of sex trafficking, following research. The office was opened for three years for the following purposes: "conducting undercover investigations, training law enforcement, rescuing victims, ensuring appropriate aftercare, and seeking perpetrator accountability".

The IJM used the grant money to found "Project Lantern" and established an office in Cebu City in the Philippines. In 2010, the results of the project were published, in which the IJM stated that Project Lantern had led to "an increase in law enforcement activity in sex trafficking cases, an increase in commitment to resolving sex trafficking cases among law enforcement officers trained through the project, and an increase in services—like shelter, counseling, and career training—provided to trafficking survivors". At the time that the results were released, the IJM was exploring opportunities to replicate the model in other regions.

=== Gates Cambridge Scholarships ===
In October 2000, William Gates established the Gates Cambridge Scholarships which allow students and scholars from the U.S. and around the world to study at Cambridge University, one of the top universities in the world. The Gates Cambridge Scholarship has often been compared to the Rhodes Scholarship, given its similarly international scope and substantial endowment. In 2000, the Gates Foundation endowed the scholarship trust with $210 million to help outstanding graduate students outside of the United Kingdom study at the University of Cambridge. The Gates Foundation has continued to contribute funds to expand the scholarship, making it one of the largest and best-endowed scholarships in the world. The Gates Cambridge Scholarship accepts less than 0.3% of applicants and remains extremely competitive. Each year, approximately 100 new graduate students from around the world receive funding to study at Cambridge.

=== Financial assistance ===
- Alliance for Financial Inclusion (AFI): A $35 million grant for the AFI supports a coalition of countries from the developing world to create savings accounts, insurance, and other financial services that are made available to people living on less than $2 per day.
- Financial Access Initiative: A $5 million grant allows Financial Access Initiative to conduct field research and answer important questions about microfinance and financial access in impoverished countries around the world.
- Pro Mujer: A five-year $3.1 million grant to Pro Mujer—a microfinance network in Latin America combining financial services with healthcare for the poorest women entrepreneurs—will be used to research new opportunities for the poorest segment of the Latin American microfinance market.
- Grameen Foundation: A $1.5 million grant allows Grameen Foundation to approve more microloans that support Grameen's goal of helping five million additional families, and successfully freeing 50 percent of those families from poverty within five years.
- Grant worth $1.3 million Lawrence Muganga for his book You Can't Make Fish Climb Trees.
- Support for Mojaloop Foundation with a 2020 grant of $4.7 million, and a 2023 grant of $8.5 million.

=== Agricultural development ===
The Gates Foundation's goal for agricultural development is "to support farmers and governments in sub-Saharan Africa and South Asia that are seeking a sustainable, inclusive agricultural transformation—one that creates economic opportunity, respects limits on natural resources, and gives everyone equal access to affordable, nutritious food". The foundation's agricultural investments include:

- International Rice Research Institute: Between November 2007 and October 2010, the Gates Foundation offered $19.9 million to the International Rice Research Institute. The goal of the aid was to support the increasing world demand for rice. The Gates Foundation claims: "To keep up with worldwide demand, the production of rice will have to increase by about 70 percent in the next two decades." The International Rice Research Institute has developed Golden Rice, a genetically modified rice variant developed to combat Vitamin A deficiency.
- Alliance for a Green Revolution in Africa (AGRA): The Gates Foundation has partnered with the Rockefeller Foundation to enhance agricultural science and small-farm productivity in Africa, building on the Green Revolution that the Rockefeller Foundation spurred in the 1940s and 1960s.
- Deutsche Gesellschaft für Technische Zusammenarbeit (GTZ): In 2009, the Gate's Foundation donated $25 million to GTZ to help develop Africa's cashew industry through improving yield and investing in local processing capabilities. GTZ would partner with the African Cashew Alliance, FairMatch Support, and Technoserve with the goal to increase the incomes of farmers in Benin, Burkina Faso, the Ivory Coast, Ghana, and Mozambique by 50% by 2012.

=== Water, sanitation and hygiene ===
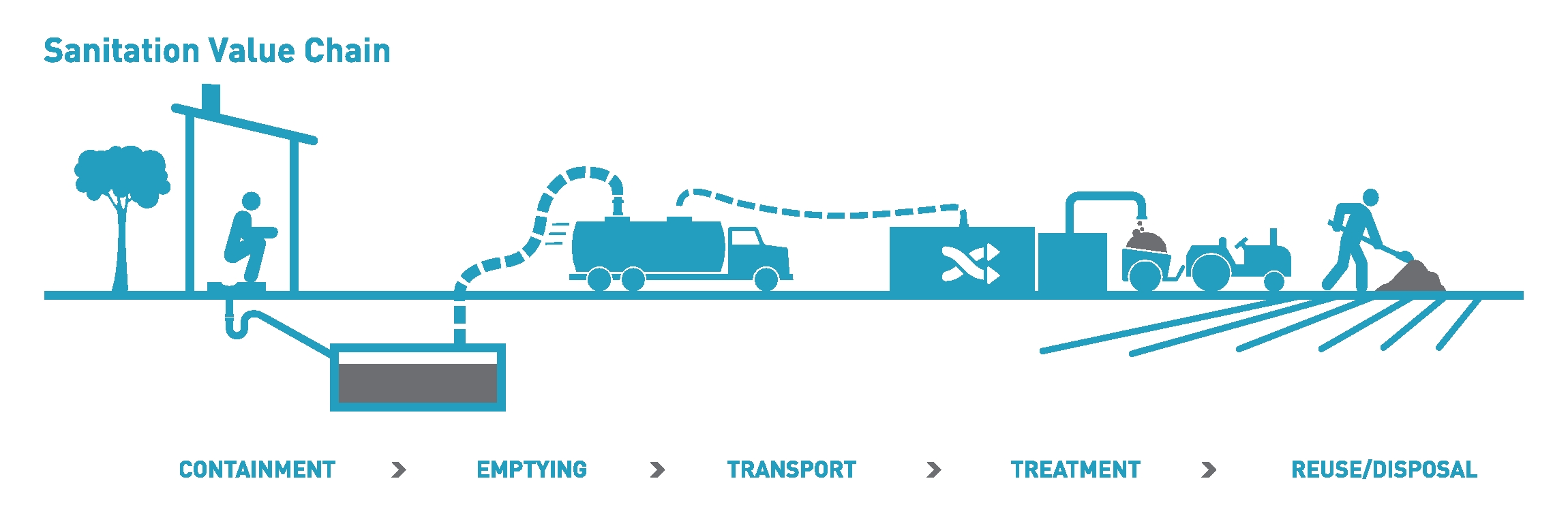
The "sanitation value chain" used by the Gates Foundation to illustrate their approach to sanitation, showing collection, transport, treatment and reuse

The Gates Foundation created this video to advocate for increased innovation for toilets and everything they are connected to.

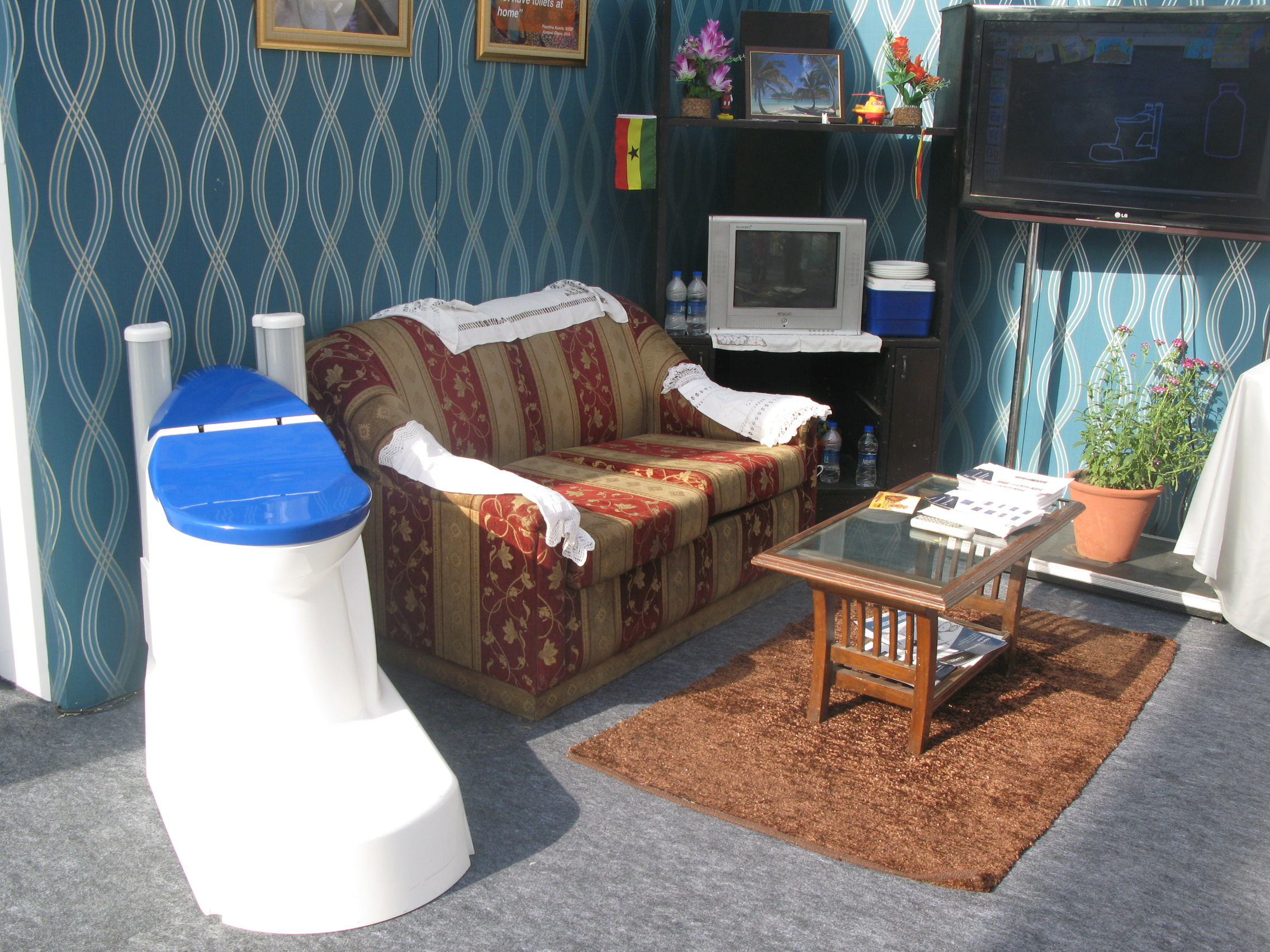
Example for technology innovation: The off-grid Nano Membrane Toilet of Cranfield University – prototype on display at Reinvent the Toilet Fair in Delhi, India

The Water, Sanitation and Hygiene (WASH) program of the Bill & Melinda Gates Foundation was launched in mid-2005 as a "Learning Initiative", and became a full-fledged program under the Global Development Division in early 2010. The foundation has since 2005 undertaken a wide range of efforts in the WASH sector involving research, experimentation, reflection, advocacy, and field implementation. In 2009, the foundation decided to refocus its WASH effort mainly on sustainable sanitation services for the poor, using non-piped sanitation services (i.e. without the use of sewers), and less on water supply. This was because the sanitation sector was generally receiving less attention from other donors and from governments, and because the foundation believed it had the potential to make a real difference through strategic investments.

In mid-2011, the foundation announced in its new "Water, Sanitation, Hygiene Strategy Overview" that its funding now focuses primarily on sanitation, particularly in sub-Saharan Africa and South Asia, because access to improved sanitation is lowest in those regions. Their grant-making focus has been since 2011 on sanitation science and technology ("transformative technologies"), delivery models at scale, urban sanitation markets, building demand for sanitation, measurement and evaluation as well as policy, advocacy and communications.

In mid-2011, the foundation stated that they had committed more than $265 million to the water, sanitation, and hygiene sector over the past five years, i.e. since about 2006. For the time period of about 2008 to mid-2015, all grants awarded to water, sanitation, and hygiene projects totaled a value of around $650 million, according to the publicly available grant database.

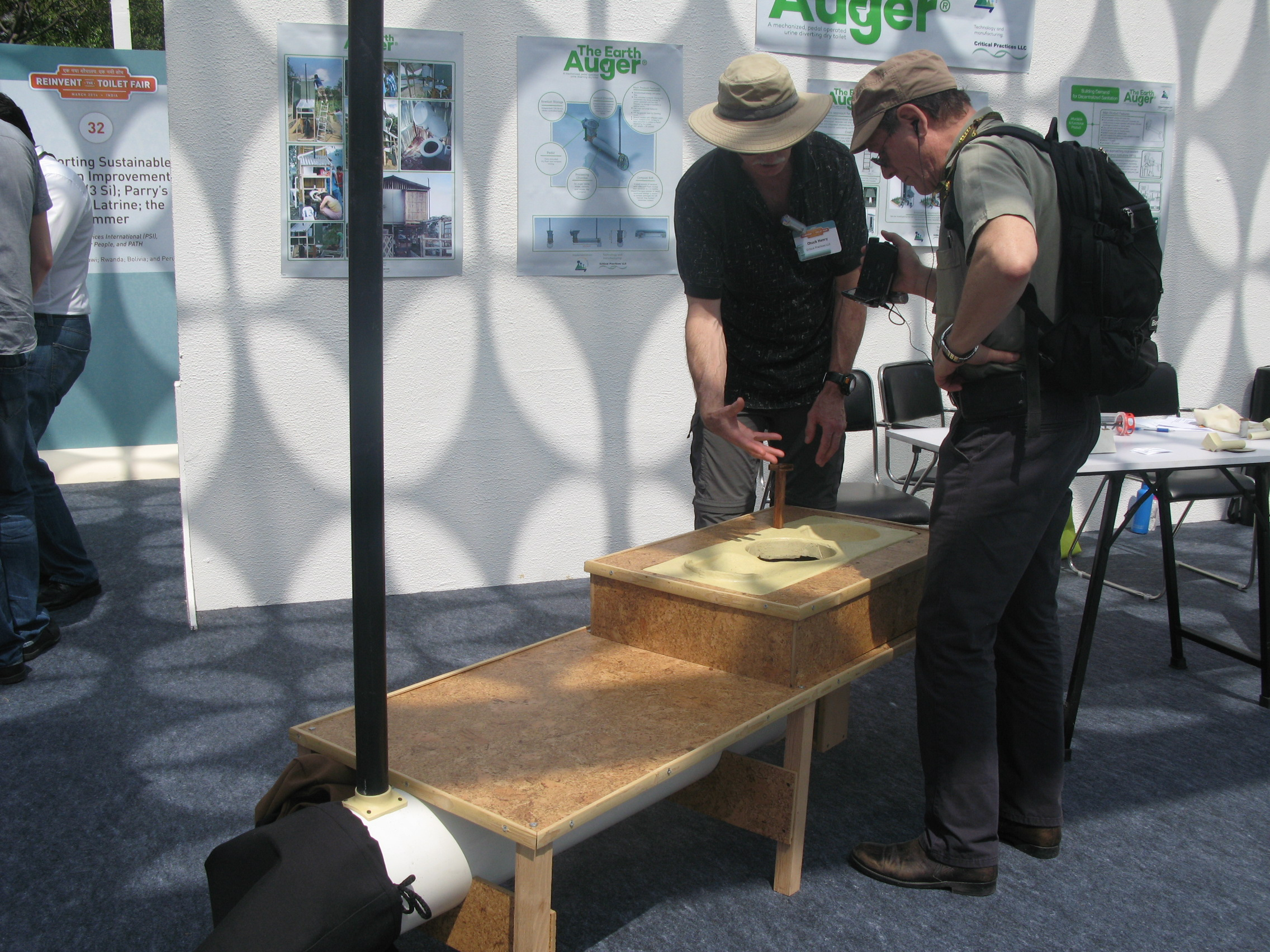
Example of low-tech toilet development being funded: A urine-diverting dry toilet called Earth Auger toilet from Ecuador/US

Improved sanitation in the developing world is a global need, but a neglected priority, as shown by the data collected by the Joint Monitoring Programme for Water Supply and Sanitation (JMP) of UNICEF and WHO. This program is tasked to monitor progress towards the Millennium Development Goal (MDG) relating to drinking water and sanitation. About one billion people have no sanitation facility whatsoever and continue to defecate in gutters, behind bushes or in open water bodies, with no dignity or privacy. This is called open defecation and it poses significant health risks. India is the country with the highest number of people practicing open defecation, with around 157 million people or approximately 11% of the total population in 2022, although the situation has improved significantly since then. The foundation has been funding many sanitation research and demonstration projects in India since about 2011.

==== Reinvent the Toilet Challenge ====
In 2011, the foundation launched a program called "Reinvent the Toilet Challenge" with the aim to promote the development of innovations in toilet design to benefit the 2.5 billion people that did not have access to safe and effective sanitation. This program has generated significant interest of the mainstream media. It was complemented by a program called "Grand Challenges Explorations" (2011 to 2013 with some follow-up grants reaching until 2015) which involved grants of $100,000 each in the first round. Both funding schemes explicitly excluded project ideas that relied on centralized sewerage systems or are not compatible with development country contexts.

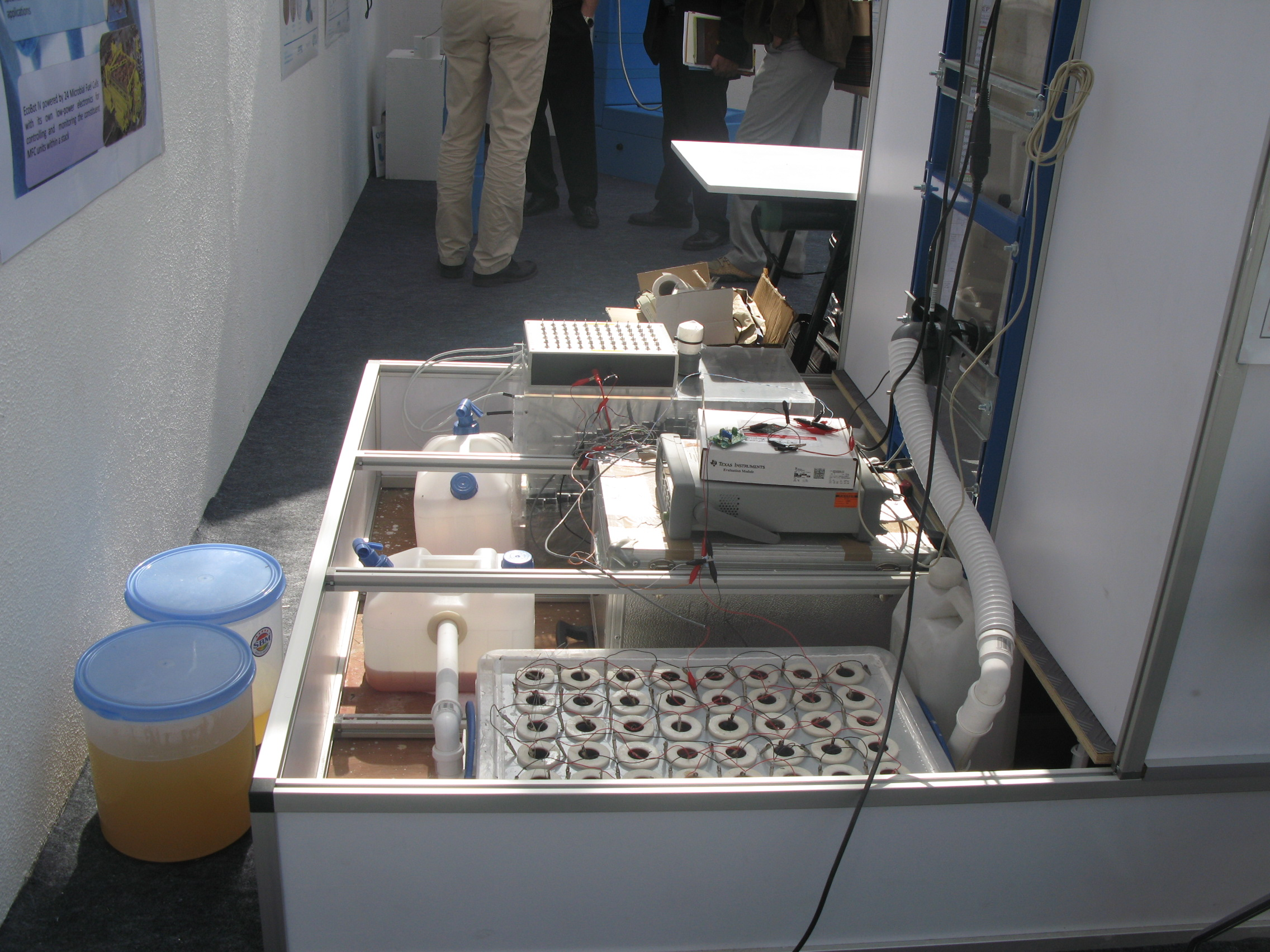
Microbial fuel cell stack that converts urine into electricity (research by the University of the West of England, UK)

Since the launch of the "Reinvent the Toilet Challenge", more than a dozen research teams, mainly at universities in the US, Europe, India, China, and South Africa, have received grants to develop innovative on-site and off-site waste treatment solutions for the urban poor. The grants were in the order of $400,000 for their first phase, followed by typically $1 million—three million for their second phase; many of them investigated resource recovery or processing technologies for excreta or fecal sludge.

The "Reinvent the Toilet Challenge" is focused on "reinventing the flush toilet". The aim was to create a toilet that not only removes pathogens from human excreta, but also recovers resources such as energy, clean water, and nutrients (a concept also known as reuse of excreta). It should operate "off-the-grid" without connections to water, sewer, or electrical networks. Finally, it should cost less than 5 cents per user per day.

High-tech toilets for tackling the growing public health problem of human waste are gaining increasing attention, but this focus on a "technology fix" has also been criticized by many in the sector. However, low-tech solutions may be more practical in poor countries, and research is also funded by the foundation for such toilets.

The Reinvent the Toilet Challenge is a long-term research and development effort to develop a hygienic, stand-alone toilet. This challenge is being complemented by another investment program to develop new technologies for improved pit latrine emptying (called by the foundation the "Omni-Ingestor") and fecal sludge processing (called "Omni-Processor"). The aim of the "Omni Processor" is to convert excreta (for example fecal sludge) into beneficial products such as energy and soil nutrients with the potential to develop local business and revenue.

==== Examples of transformative technologies research ====
- About 200 sanitation projects in many different countries and at various scales—some with a technology focus, some with a focus on market development or policy and advocacy, have received funding from the foundation since 2008.
- The University of KwaZulu-Natal in Durban, South Africa Gates Foundation was awarded $1.6 million in 2014 to act as a hub for sanitation researchers and product developers.
- One example of an Omni-Processor is a combustion-based system designed to turn fecal sludge into energy and drinking water. The development of this particular prototype by U.S.-based company Sedron Technologies (formerly Janicki Bioenergy) attracted media attention for the sanitation crisis and the work of the foundation after Bill Gates drank water produced from this process.
- Examples for the Reinvent the Toilet Challenge include: Scientists at the University of Colorado Boulder were given funding of $1.8 million to develop a prototype toilet that uses solar heat to treat the fecal matter and produce biochar. Funding has been provided to RTI International since 2012 to develop a toilet based on electrochemical disinfection and solid waste combustion.

=== Other global initiatives ===
Some examples include:

- 2004 Indian Ocean earthquake: The foundation made total grant donations of $3 million to various charities to help with the aid effort for victims of the earthquake. These charities include: CARE international, International Rescue Committee, Mercy Corps, Save the Children, and World Vision.
- 2005 Kashmir earthquake: The foundation made a donation of $500,000 for the earthquake.
- In 2014, the Gates Foundation released "flexible funds" in the order of $50 million to United Nations agencies and other organizations involved in the work against the deadly disease Ebola in West Africa.
- 2021 Emergency Funding. The foundation, with a group of philanthropists, has pledged £93.5m funding to cover UK foreign aid cuts.

The foundation is a donor to the National Geographic Society.

The foundation is working with Mastercard, GAVI and TrustStamp to create the Mastercard Well Pass. This program, being tested in 2020 in West Africa, will integrate vaccination records with cashless payment capability.

== Global health division ==
Since 2011, the president of the Global Health Program is Trevor Mundel:

- The Global Fund to Fight AIDS, Tuberculosis and Malaria: The foundation has donated more than $6.6 billion for global health programs, including over $1.3 billion donated as of 2012 on malaria alone, greatly increasing the dollars spent per year on malaria research. Before the Gates efforts on malaria, malaria drugmakers had largely given up on producing drugs to fight the disease, and the foundation is the world's largest donor to research on diseases of the poor. With the help of Gates-funded vaccination drives, deaths from measles in Africa have dropped by 90 percent since 2000.

The foundation has donated billions of dollars to help sufferers of AIDS, tuberculosis and malaria, protecting millions of children from death at the hands of preventable diseases.

The Global Health Program's other significant grants include:

- Polio eradication: In 2006, the foundation provided $86 million toward efforts attempting to eradicate poliomyelitis (polio).
- The GAVI vaccine alliance: The foundation gave the GAVI Alliance (formerly the "Global Alliance for Vaccines and Immunization") a donation of $750 million on January 25, 2005.
- Children's Vaccine Program: The Children's Vaccine Program, run by the Program for Appropriate Technology in Health (PATH), received a donation of $27 million to help vaccinate against Japanese encephalitis on December 9, 2003.
- HIV Research: The foundation donated a total of $287 million to various HIV/AIDS researchers. The money was split between 16 different research teams across the world, on the condition that the findings are shared amongst the teams.
- Aeras Global TB Vaccine Foundation: The foundation gave the Aeras Global TB Vaccine Foundation more than $280 million to develop and license an improved vaccine against tuberculosis (TB) for use in high-burden countries (HBCs).
- Cheaper high-tech tuberculosis (TB) test: In August 2012, the foundation, in partnership with PEPFAR (United States President's Emergency Plan for AIDS Relief), USAID (United States Agency for International Development) and UNITAID (an international drug purchasing facility hosted by WHO), announced they had finalized an agreement to reduce the cost of a commercial TB test (Cepheid's Xpert MTB/RIF run on the GeneXpert platform), from $16.86 to $9.98. This test can take the place of smear microscopy, a technique first developed in the 1880s by Robert Koch. Smear microscopy often does not show TB infection in persons who are also co-infected with HIV, whereas the GeneXpert system can show TB in the co-infected patient. In addition, the system can show whether the particular TB strain is resistant to the bactericidal antibiotic rifampicin, a widely accepted indicator of the presence of multidrug resistant tuberculosis.
- Visceral leishmaniasis (VL) research: The foundation awarded the Hebrew University of Jerusalem's Kuvin Center for the Study of Infectious and Tropical Diseases a $5 million grant in 2009 for research into visceral leishmaniasis (VL), an emerging parasitic disease in Ethiopia, Africa, where it is frequently associated with HIV/AIDS and is a leading cause of adult illness and death. The project, a collaborative effort with Addis Ababa University, will gather data for analysis—to identify the weak links in the transmission cycle—and devise methods for control of the disease. In 2005 the foundation provided a $30 million grant to The Institute for OneWorld Health to support the nonprofit pharmaceutical company's VL work in the rural communities of India, Bangladesh and Nepal. By September 2006, the company had received approval from the Indian body Drug-Controller General of India (DCGI) for the Paromomycin Intramuscular (IM) Injection, a drug that provides an effective cure for VL following a 21-day course. In 2010 Raj Shankar Ghosh, the Regional Director for the South Asia Institute for OneWorld Health, explained that the foundation funded "the majority of our work" in the development of the drug.
- Group B streptococcus: The foundation gave $17,252,854 in September 2016 to Pfizer to develop a vaccine against Group B streptococcus (GBS) for distribution in developing countries. In May 2022, the funding was renewed with an additional $100,000,000.
- Next-Generation Condom: The foundation gave $100,000 to 11 applicants in November 2013 to develop an improved condom; that is, one that "significantly preserves or enhances pleasure, in order to improve uptake and regular use", according to the Gates Foundation's Grand Challenges in Global Health website. Further grants of up to $1 million will be given to projects that are successful.
- Neglected tropical diseases (NTDs): Alongside WHO, the governments of the United States, United Kingdom and United Arab Emirates, and the World Bank, the foundation endorsed the London Declaration on Neglected Tropical Diseases, "to eradicate, eliminate and intensify control of 17 selected diseases by 2015 and 2020", at a meeting on January 30, 2012, held at the Royal College of Physicians in London, UK. Gates was the principal organizer responsible for bringing together the heads of 13 of the world's largest pharmaceutical companies and the foundation's monetary commitment to the Declaration was $363 million over five years. On April 3, 2014, the second anniversary of the Declaration, Gates attended a meeting in Paris at which participants reviewed the progress that had been made against 10 neglected tropical diseases (NTDs). The foundation committed a further $50 million, together with $50 million from the Children's Investment Fund Foundation and $120 million from the World Bank. The foundation has given in excess of $1 million to The END Fund, a public-private partnership to deliver medication for NTDs to areas in need.
- Monoclonal antibody therapies: In October 2018, the foundation awarded $8,279,723 to Inovio Pharmaceuticals to fund the development of "next-generation" delivery methods for monoclonal antibodies targeted for use in low- and middle-income countries.
- Coalition for Epidemic Preparedness Innovations (CEPI): A global group tasked with more quickly developing vaccines against infectious disease threats worldwide was launched on January 8, 2017, by a coalition of governments and nonprofit groups including the Bill & Melinda Gates Foundation. The Coalition for Epidemic Preparedness Innovations, funded with an initial investment of $460 million from Germany, Japan, Norway, the Wellcome Trust and the Gates foundation, aims to develop vaccines against known infectious disease threats that could be deployed quickly to contain outbreaks before they become global health emergencies, the group said in a statement at the World Economic Forum in Davos, Switzerland.
- The Big Catch-up: In response to the decline in childhood vaccination rates affecting over 100 countries due to the COVID-19 pandemic, global health partners including WHO, UNICEF, Gavi, and the Vaccine Alliance launched "The Big Catch-up" initiative. This collaborative effort aims to reverse vaccination declines, particularly in 20 countries with the highest numbers of missed vaccinations. Over 25 million children missed at least one vaccination in 2021, leading to preventable disease outbreaks. The initiative focuses on strengthening healthcare systems, building trust in vaccines, and addressing barriers to immunization, with an emphasis on reaching vulnerable populations.

=== COVID-19 ===
Beginning in 2020, the Bill & Melinda Gates Foundation has provided hundreds of millions of dollars of funding towards initiatives surrounding the COVID-19 public health crisis.

==== COVID-19 Therapeutics Accelerator ====
In 2020, together with the UK research charity Wellcome and Mastercard, the Gates Foundation established the COVID-19 Therapeutics Accelerator to hasten the development and evaluation of new and repurposed drugs and biologics to treat patients for COVID-19. After the World Health Organization's appeal for funding, the Gates Foundation pledged an extra US$150 million on top of the US$100 million already committed earlier.

By April 2020, the foundation had provided backing for six candidates for vaccines against COVID-19. In June, the foundation tapped the National University of Singapore to investigate which countries in Asia responded effectively to the pandemic. On June 26, the foundation and its partners with the COVID-19 Therapeutics Accelerator announced the launch of the International COVID-19 Data Alliance (ICODA) to be hosted at Health Data Research UK.

In December 2020, the foundation solicited applications for funding for researchers at McMaster University to develop epidemiological models for SARS-CoV-2, as well as COVID-19 vaccines, treatments and non-pharmaceutical interventions. The foundation re-upped its support of ICODA in May 2021 with a grant of $577,246.

In August 2021, the foundation awarded a $587,568 grant to Wits Health Consortium to test the effectiveness of the COVID-19 vaccines distributed in South Africa by Johnson & Johnson and Pfizer.

In November 2021, the foundation gave $2,118,334 to Providence Therapeutics to develop more cost-effective mRNA vaccines.

== United States division ==
Under President Allan Golston, the United States Program has made grants such as the following:

=== Donation to Planned Parenthood ===
Up to 2013, the Bill & Melinda Gates Foundation provided $71 million to Planned Parenthood and affiliated organizations. In 2014, Melinda Gates has stated that the foundation "has decided not to fund abortion", focusing instead on family planning and contraception in order to avoid conflation of abortion and family planning. In response to questions about this decision, Gates stated in a June 2014 blog post that "[she], like everyone else, struggle[s] with the issue" and that "the emotional and personal debate about abortion is threatening to get in the way of the lifesaving consensus regarding basic family planning". Since this time, their endeavors have shifted to a more global perspective, focusing on voluntary family planning and maternal and newborn health.

=== Libraries ===
In 1997, the charity introduced a U.S. Libraries initiative with a goal of "ensuring that if you can get to a public library, you can reach the internet". The foundation has given grants, installed computers and software, and provided training and technical support in partnership with public libraries nationwide to increase access and knowledge. Helping provide access and training for these resources, this foundation helps move public libraries into the digital age.

Most recently, the foundation gave a $12.2 million grant to the Southeastern Library Network (SOLINET) to assist libraries in Louisiana and Mississippi on the Gulf Coast, many of which were damaged or destroyed by Hurricanes Katrina and Rita.

=== Education ===
A key aspect of the Gates Foundation's U.S. efforts involves an overhaul of the country's education policies at both the K-12 and college levels, including support for teacher evaluations and charter schools and opposition to seniority-based layoffs and other aspects of the education system that are typically backed by teachers' unions. It spent $373 million on education in 2009. It has also donated to the two largest national teachers' unions. The foundation was the biggest early backer of the Common Core State Standards Initiative. In October 2017 it was announced that the Bill and Melinda Gates Foundation would spend more than $1.7 billion over five years to pay for new initiatives in public education.

One of the foundation's goals is to lower poverty by increasing the number of college graduates in the United States, and the organization has funded "Reimagining Aid Design and Delivery" grants to think tanks and advocacy organizations to produce white papers on ideas for changing the current system of federal financial aid for college students, to increase graduation rates. One of the ways the foundation has sought to increase the number of college graduates is to get them through college faster, but that idea has received some pushback from organizations of universities and colleges.

As part of its education-related initiatives, the foundation has funded journalists, think tanks, lobbying organizations, and governments. Millions of dollars of grants to news organizations have funded reporting on education and higher education, including more than $1.4 million to the Education Writers Association to fund training for journalists who cover education.

Some of the foundation's educational initiatives have included:

- Gates Cambridge Scholarships: In 2000, the Gates Foundation donated $210 million to help outstanding graduate students from the U.S. and around the world to study at the prestigious University of Cambridge. The Gates Cambridge Scholarship has often been compared to the Rhodes Scholarship given its international scope and substantial endowment. The scholarship remains extremely competitive with just 0.3% of applicants being selected. Each year, approximately 100 new graduate students from around the world receive funding to attend Cambridge University. Several buildings at the University of Cambridge also bear the name of William and Melinda Gates after sizable contributions to their construction.

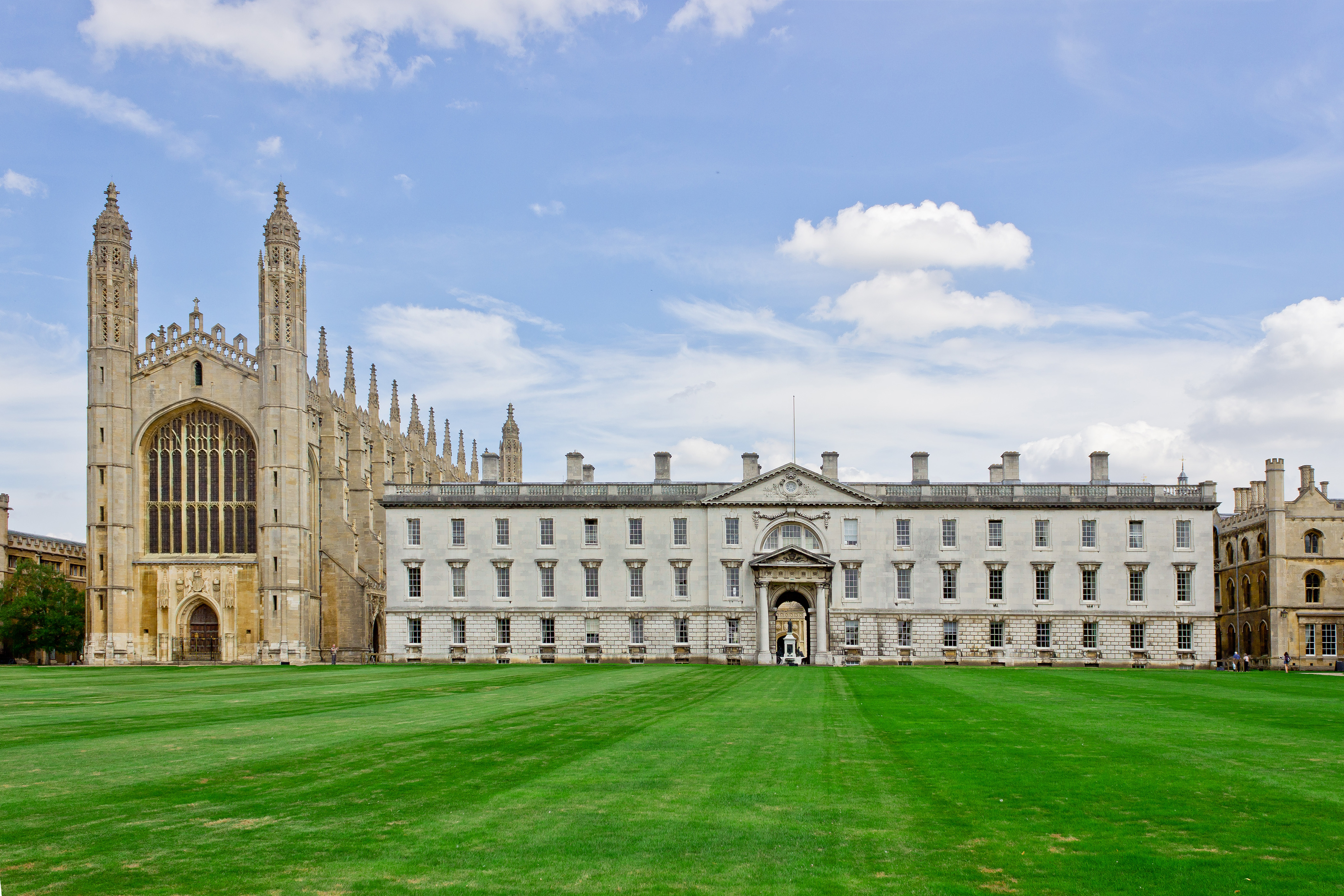
Cambridge University

- Cornell University: Received $25 million from the foundation for a new Information Science building, named "Bill and Melinda Gates Hall". The total cost of the building was estimated at $60 million. Construction began in March 2012 and officially opened in January 2014.
- Massachusetts Institute of Technology: Part of the Ray and Maria Stata Center is known as the "Gates Tower" in recognition of partial funding of the building.
- Carnegie Mellon University: The foundation gave $20 million to the Carnegie Mellon School of Computer Science for a new Computer Science building called the "Gates Center for Computer Science". It officially opened on September 22, 2009.
- Smaller schools: The Gates Foundation claims one in five students is unable to read and grasp the contents of what they read, and African American and Latino students are graduating high school with the skills of a middle school student. Gates Foundation has invested more than $250 million in grants to create new small schools, reduce student-to-teacher ratios, and to divide up large high schools through the schools-within-a-school model.
- D.C. Achievers Scholarships: The Gates Foundation announced March 22, 2007, a $122 million initiative to send hundreds of the District of Columbia's poorest students to college.
- Gates Millennium Scholars: Administered by the United Negro College Fund, the foundation donated $1.5 billion for scholarships to high achieving minority students.
- NewSchools Venture Fund: The foundation contributed $30 million to help NewSchools to manage more charter schools, which aim to prepare students in historically underserved areas for college and careers.
- Strong American Schools: On April 25, 2007, the Gates Foundation joined forces with the Eli and Edythe Broad Foundation pledging a joint $60 million to create Strong American Schools, a nonprofit project responsible for running ED in 08, an initiative and information campaign aimed at encouraging 2008 presidential contenders to include education in their campaign policies.
- Teaching Channel: The Gates Foundation announced in September 2011 a $3.5 million initiative to launch a multi-platform service delivering professional development videos for teachers over the Internet, public television, cable and other digital outlets. To date, over 500,000 teachers and educators have joined the community to share ideas, lesson plans and teaching methods.
- The Gates Scholarship Program: In October 2015, the foundation committed $417.2 million to the Hispanic Scholarship Fund to administer The Gates Scholarship, a program that would support high-achieving minority students from low-income backgrounds through the completion of their undergraduate degrees. The program was officially launched in 2017.
- The Texas High School Project: The project was set out to increase and improve high school graduation rates across Texas. The foundation committed $84.6 million to the project beginning in 2003. The project focuses its efforts on high-need schools and districts statewide, with an emphasis on urban areas and the Texas-Mexico border.
- University Scholars Program: Donated $20 million in 1998 to endow a scholarship program at Melinda Gates' alma mater, Duke University. The program provides full scholarships to about 10 members of each undergraduate class and one member in each class in each of the professional schools (schools of medicine, business, law, divinity, environment, nursing, and public policy), as well as to students in the Graduate School pursuing doctoral degrees in any discipline. Graduate and professional school scholars serve as mentors to the undergraduate scholars, who are chosen based on financial need and potential for interdisciplinary academic interests. Scholars are chosen each spring from new applicants to Duke University's undergraduate, graduate, and professional school programs. The program features seminars to bring these scholars together for interdisciplinary discussions and an annual spring symposium organized by the scholars.
- Washington State Achievers Scholarship: The Washington State Achievers program encourages schools to create cultures of high academic achievement while providing scholarship support to select college-bound students.
- William H. Gates Public Service Law Program: This program awards five full scholarships annually to the University of Washington School of Law. Scholars commit to working in relatively low-paying public service legal positions for at least the first five years following graduation.
- University of Texas at Austin: $30 million challenge grant to build the Bill & Melinda Gates Computer Science Complex.
- STAND UP: a national campaign that seeks to positively impact the current crisis within the United States public education system by calling upon community leaders, parents, students, and citizens to encourage change and STAND UP for better schools and the future of America's children. STAND UP was co-founded by the Eli Broad Foundation and was launched in April 2006 on The Oprah Winfrey Show in a two-part feature.
- Alliance for Early Success to support the promotion, education, coordination, and alignment of policies that support vulnerable children ages birth through age eight.
- Every Student Succeeds Act: donated about $44 million to help with the 2015 federal education law.
- The Gates Scholarship Program, which awards The Gates Scholarship (TGS), was launched in 2017.

=== Pacific Northwest ===
- Discovery Institute: Donated $1 million in 2000 to the Discovery Institute and pledged $9.35 million over 10 years in 2003, including $50,000 of Bruce Chapman's $141,000 annual salary. According to a Gates Foundation grant maker, this grant is "exclusive to the Cascadia project" on regional transportation, and it may not be used for the institute's other activities, including promotion of intelligent design.
- Computer History Museum: Donated $15 million to the museum in October 2005.

== Criticism and controversies ==
=== Education programs ===
Some critics fear that the foundation directs the conversation on education or pushing its point of view through news coverage. The foundation has said it lists all its grants publicly and does not enforce any rules for content among its grantees, who have editorial independence. Union activists in Chicago have accused Gates Foundation grantee Teach Plus, which was founded by new teachers and advocates against seniority-based layoffs, of "astroturfing".

The K-12 and higher education reform programs of the Gates Foundation have been criticized by some education professionals, parents, and researchers who argue they have driven the conversation on education reform to such an extent that they may marginalize researchers who do not support Gates' predetermined policy preferences. Several Gates-backed policies such as small schools, charter schools, and increasing class sizes have been expensive and disruptive, but some studies indicate they have not improved educational outcomes and may have caused harm.

Examples of some of the K-12 reforms advocated by the foundation include closing ineffective neighborhood schools in favor of privately run charter schools; extensively using standardized test scores to evaluate the progress of students, teachers, and schools; and merit pay for teachers based on student test scores. Critics also believe that the Gates Foundation exerts too much influence over public education policy without being accountable to voters or taxpayers.

=== About the global health division ===
A 2007 investigation by the Los Angeles Times claimed there are three major unintended consequences with the foundation's allocation of aid towards the fight against AIDS, tuberculosis, and malaria. First, sub-Saharan Africa already suffered from a shortage of primary doctors before the arrival of the Gates Foundation, but "by pouring most contributions into the fight against such high-profile killers as AIDS, Gates grantees have increased the demand for specially trained, higher-paid clinicians, diverting staff from basic care" in sub-Saharan Africa. This "brain drain" adds to the existing doctor shortage and pulls away additional trained staff from children and those suffering from other common killers. Second, "the focus on a few diseases has shortchanged basic needs such as nutrition and transportation". Third, "Gates-funded vaccination programs have instructed caregivers to ignore—even discourage patients from discussing—ailments that the vaccinations cannot prevent".

In response, the Gates Foundation has said that African governments need to spend more of their budgets on public health than on wars, that the foundation has donated at least $70 million to help improve nutrition and agriculture in Africa, in addition to its disease-related initiatives and that it is studying ways to improve the delivery of health care in Africa.

Both insiders and external critics have suggested that there is too much deference to Bill Gates's personal views within the Gates Foundation, insufficient internal debate, and pervasive "group think". Critics also complain that Gates Foundation grants are often awarded based on social connections and ideological allegiances rather than based on formal external review processes or technical competence.

Critics have suggested that Gates' approach to Global Health and Agriculture favors the interests of large pharmaceutical and agribusiness companies over the interests of the people of developing countries. After the Gates foundation urged the University of Oxford to find a large company partner to get its COVID-19 vaccine to market, the university backed off from its earlier pledge to donate the rights to any drugmaker.

Critics have outlined that the "Global Health Governance" approach as its conducted by the Gates Foundation can best be understood as "Global Health Imperialism" breaking with the "traditional notions of Westphalian sovereignty" by enforcing capitalist policies on all countries. Also the broader concept of "philanthrocapitalism" is criticised as not addressing the real issue of systemic inequality of capitalism. Instead of real social change, organisations such as the Gates Foundation represent the interests of "highly sophisticated capitalists who know what they want and how best to get it"—the "Global Health Imperialism" agenda is devoted "to expanding worldwide markets and facilitating commerce on behalf of Western capitalism".

Some experts have pointed that, while it is true that the foundation exercises inordinate power on the WHO, that is possible because the WHO is chronically underfunded and has prestige problems. Some rich countries have narrower views on global health and engage in vaccine nationalism. The foundation is criticized for not battling monopolies on intellectual property, crowding out different views on policy and favoring solutionism. Its focus on concrete illnesses leads away of system changes.

=== AGRA ===
The Bill & Melinda Gates Foundation is one of the founders and primary financiers of the Alliance for a Green Revolution in Africa (AGRA), an African-led organization focused on "transforming African agriculture" to improve food security in Africa and reduce poverty among small farmers. Some critics allege that by encouraging the use of mass-produced fertilizers and new seed varieties, AGRA's hidden goal is not to lift small farmers out of poverty, but to control them through dependence on profit-oriented international supply chains. The Guardian reported that the commercial seed laws that the foundation proposes in African nations benefits only a few corporations, including Bayer, Dupont, Monsanto, and Syngenta which control an estimated 60% of the world's seeds and 70% of the chemicals used to grow food. The laws also enforce UPOV 91 which restricts all farmers from saving or sharing seeds. Naturally grown varieties do not meet the "uniformity" criteria for all seeds being the exact same kind, and thus forces small farmers to apply for expensive certifications. Meanwhile, partners of AGRA and the Foundation are able to patent varieties that have existed for generations in Africa.

The Guardian has criticized AGRA and the Bill & Melinda Gates Foundation for their close ties to Western agribusinesses, which have been accused of harming African farmers. Rob Horsch, a former Monsanto executive who served as Vice President of International Development Partnerships, later joined the Gates Foundation as Deputy Director of Agricultural Research and Development, where he played a key role in shaping AGRA's policies. The Gates Foundation subsequently purchased 500,000 shares in Monsanto, further fueling rumours about the corporation's influence in African agriculture. Despite its promises, AGRA failed to achieve its objective of cutting food insecurity by half, and has instead been linked to an increase in undernourishment affecting an additional 30 million people.

Criticism of the Gates Foundation's support for AGRA has also focused in part on its promotion of high-yielding staple crops and increased use of agrochemicals. Critics have raised concerns about the effects of this approach on crop and dietary diversity, micronutrient availability, and public health, including potential health risks associated with increased agrochemical use. They have therefore questioned whether promoting AGRA is consistent with the Gates Foundation's stated emphasis on improving public health and nutrition.

=== Modi Goalkeepers Award ===
On September 24, 2019, the Bill and Melinda Gates Foundation gave its Goalkeepers Global Goals award to Indian prime minister Narendra Modi. The decision to award Modi was widely criticized by academics, Nobel Prize laureates, and human rights activists from all over the world. A petition signed by over 100,000 people also demanded that the Gates Foundation rescind the award. Critics insisted that Modi, a Hindu nationalist prime minister with allegations of human rights abuse, should not be celebrated by an organization whose mission states that 'every life has equal value and all people deserve healthy lives.' By giving Modi this prestigious award, they remarked, the Gates Foundation contributes in legitimizing the rule of Modi.

=== Poverty and education policy ===
Critics say the Bill & Melinda Gates Foundation has overlooked the links between poverty and poor academic achievement and has unfairly demonized teachers for poor achievement by underprivileged students. They contend that the Gates Foundation should be embracing anti-poverty and living wage policies rather than pursuing untested and empirically unsupported education reforms.

Critics say that Gates-backed reforms such as increasing the use of technology in education may financially benefit Microsoft and the Gates family.

=== Calls for divestment ===
The foundation trust invests undistributed assets, with the exclusive goal of maximizing the return on investment. As a result, its investments include companies that have been criticized for worsening poverty in the same developing countries where the foundation is attempting to relieve poverty. These include companies that pollute heavily and pharmaceutical companies that do not sell into the developing world. In response to press criticism, in 2007 the foundation announced a review of its investments to assess social responsibility. It subsequently canceled the review and stood by its policy of investing for maximum return, while using voting rights to influence company practices.

Critics have called on the Gates Foundation to divest from the GEO Group, the second-largest private prison corporation in the United States. A large part of the prison's work involves incarcerating and detaining migrants that have been detained by the Obama administration and the Trump administration. In spring 2014, the Gates Foundation acknowledged its $2.2 million investment in the prison corporation. It rebuffed critics' request that it sever investment ties with the prison corporation. It has refused to comment on whether it is continuing its investments, as of 2016.

=== Epstein controversy ===
In February 2026, the Bill & Melinda Gates Foundation publicly denied making any financial payments to Jeffrey Epstein or ever employing him after emails between Epstein and foundation staff were released by the U.S. Department of Justice.

The foundation acknowledged that a limited number of employees engaged with Epstein because he claimed he could help mobilize philanthropic resources for global health and development, but stated that no collaboration was pursued, no fund was created, and no money was exchanged. It also said it “regrets having any employees interact with Epstein in any way”.

The release of the documents also showed that Bill Gates met with Epstein multiple times after Epstein’s 2008 conviction, meetings Gates later described as a mistake and confined to discussions about philanthropy. The revelations renewed public scrutiny of Gates’ past interactions with Epstein, though no evidence of criminal wrongdoing by the foundation emerged.

In April 2026, the Gates Foundation announced an independent investigation into the organization's ties with Jeffrey Epstein.

In July 2026, Warren Buffett, who was a founding trustee of the Gates Foundation, announced that he would cease donating to the Gates Foundation. He had made no donations to the foundation in 2026 until then either. In addition, Buffett would also sever his decades-long partnership with the foundation, as well will as redirect money he intended for the foundation to inherit to four foundations run by his family.

== Awards ==
- In 2006, the foundation won the Prince of Asturias Award for International Cooperation.
- In 2007, then-President of India Pratibha Devisingh Patil presented the Indira Gandhi Prize for Peace, Disarmament and Development to the Bill & Melinda Gates Foundation.
- In recognition of the foundation's philanthropic activities in India, Bill and Melinda Gates jointly received India's third highest civilian honor Padma Bhushan in 2015.

== See also ==
- Bill & Melinda Gates Medical Research Institute
- Corporate social responsibility
- Global Alliance for Improved Nutrition
- List of wealthiest charitable foundations
- Philanthropy
- Social enterprise
- Social entrepreneurship
- Social responsibility
