= Allan Golston =

- Citizenship: United States
- Education: University of Colorado Denver
- Known for: Bill and Melinda Gates Foundation president, charter schools
- Board member of: Charter School Growth Fund, Bill and Melinda Gates Foundation

Allan Golston is the president of the United States Program at the Bill & Melinda Gates Foundation. He leads the Bill & Melinda Gates Foundation's five areas of strategy, policy and advocacy, and operations of a $600 million domestic program with $3.8 billion portfolio under management: K-12 Education, Post-Secondary Education, Technology Access, Special Initiatives, and Family Homelessness, Early Childhood Learning, and Community Grants in Washington State.

Golston is a Director at Harley-Davidson since 2017.

== Biography ==
Upon completion of his college degree (BS in accounting, University of Colorado Denver), Golston joined the firm KPMG Peat Marwick as a senior auditor. He later moved on to MIS, Inc., as Director of Business Analysis and Product Development, where he was responsible for designing and implementing accounting software systems for the insurance and banking industries.

In 1993, Golston returned to his alma mater, joining the University of Colorado Hospital as its director of finance and controller. In this position, Golston managed the whole of hospital finance, including accounting, risk management, compliance, debt, and some $400 million in hospital investments.

After four years at the university's hospital, Golston accepted a position with Seattle's Swedish Medical Center, acting as the hospital's Director of Finance. In addition to the daily financial operations surrounding performance, accounting and reporting, tax compliance, and risk management, Golston also managed hospital investments worth approximately $500 million.

Three years later, Golston was approached by the Bill & Melinda Gates Foundation and asked to join the organization as chief financial officer. Because of the foundation's unique executive structure, when Golston accepted the CFO role he also took on chief administrative officer duties. In this doubled capacity, Golston managed accounting, taxes, and financial planning and analysis, while simultaneously leading the foundation's work in human resources, information technology, and operations. For nine months in 2006, Golston was the interim executive director of the foundation's Global Health division.

In October 2006, Golston was offered the role of president of the foundation's U.S. Program.

In December 2010, Golston was appointed to the board of directors for Stryker Corporation. He became lead director in 2016.

In addition to his work at the foundation, Golston also sits on a number of boards (University of Washington Medicine, Seattle University, Charter School Growth Fund, MOM Brands). Golston is a lifetime member of the British-American Project and has previously been an active board member for Global Alliance for Vaccines and Immunization (GAVI), New Futures, Make-A-Wish Foundation of Alaska and Washington, Philanthropy Northwest, and the Public Library of Science. Golston is a resource council member for both the Rainier Scholars program and the Robert Woods Johnson Commission to Build a Healthier America, on the advisory committee for the Northwest African American Museum in Seattle, and is on the Resource Council for the Smithsonian National Museum of African American History and Culture in Washington DC. Golston is also actively involved in the HOPE Street Bipartisan Commission and the INROADS Alumni Association. He is a member of the 2009 class of Henry Crown Fellows at the Aspen Institute.

== See also ==
- Strong American Schools
- Bill & Melinda Gates Foundation
