= Impatient Optimist =

Sculpture by Janet Echelman in Seattle, Washington, U.S.

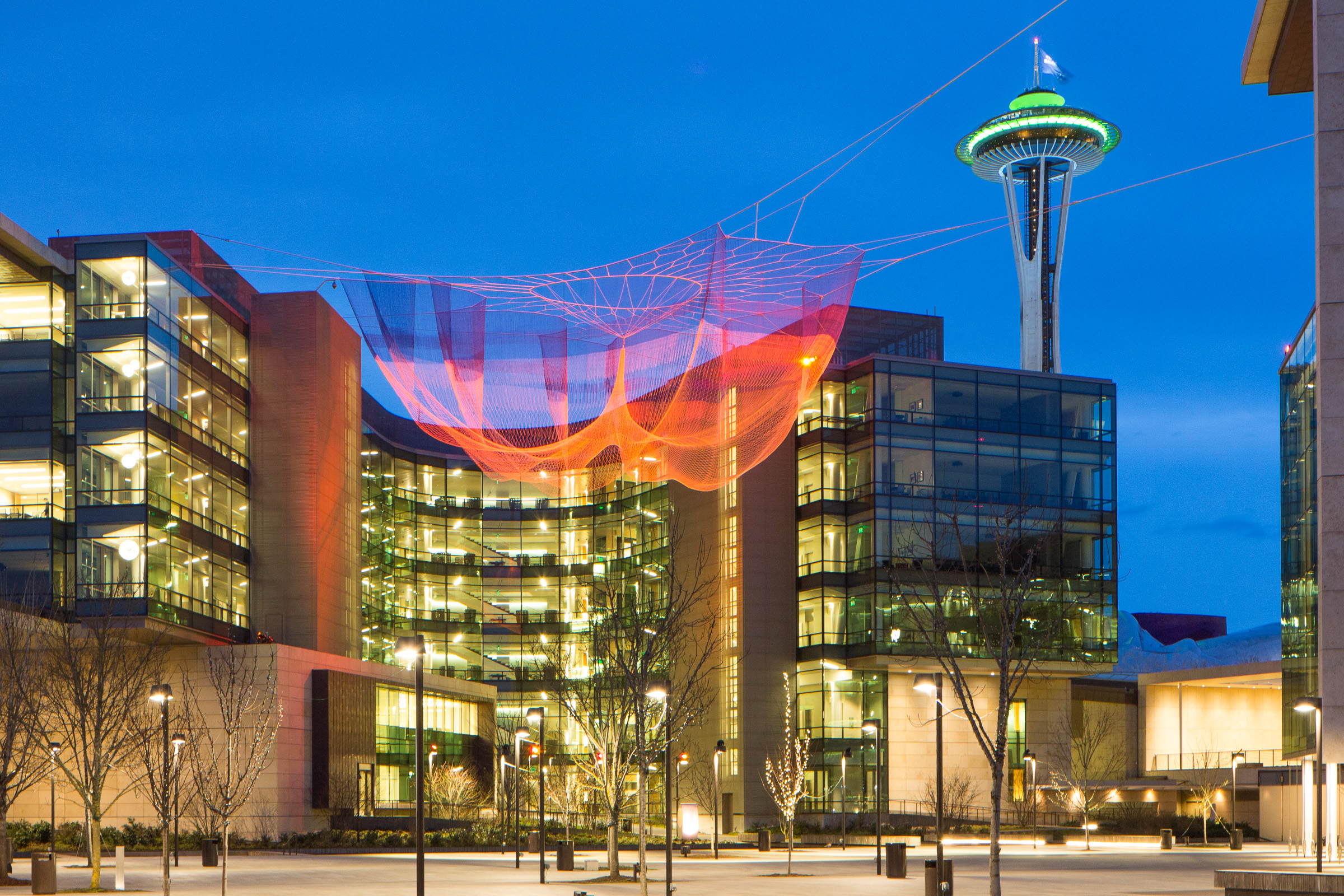
- Artist: Janet Echelman
- Location: Seattle, Washington, U.S.
- 47°37′24″N 122°20′45″W

Impatient Optimist is a sculpture by Janet Echelman, installed in Seattle, Washington.

== Description and history ==
Installed in 2015, Impatient Optimist was commissioned by the Gates Foundation for their global campus in downtown Seattle that opened in 2011. The aerial net sculpture is 120 feet long, 80 feet wide, and 40 feet deep.

The piece is designed to represent the importance of individuals and connect all of the regional campuses of the foundation across the globe. The structure of the piece is inspired by what Echelman and her team were able to visually represent as "the shape of a day". By taking pictures of the Seattle sky every five minutes for a full 24 hour period, the Studio analyzed the color data of the picture sequence and graphed it radially. This is their shape of a Seattle day. Utilizing pre-programmed lighting sequences, at night, the sculpture echoes the sunrise in each of the foundation's global offices in real time.

The work was recognized at the ACEC 2016 Engineering Excellence Awards.

Impatient Optimist is featured in artist Janet Echelman’s 2025 book Radical Softness: The Responsive Art of Janet Echelman, which highlights the sculpture as part of her public art practice.
