= Mary Eaton (disambiguation) =

Mary Eaton (1901–1948) was an American stage actress, singer, and dancer.

Mary Eaton may also refer to:

- Mary E. Eaton (1844–1915), African American suffragist and teacher
- Mary Emily Eaton (1873–1961), English botanical artist

== See also ==
- Mary Heaton (disambiguation)
