= London Central Portfolio =

UK real estate investment

LCP Private Office (LCP)
- Company type: Private company
- Industry: Real estate
- Founded: 1990 in London, United Kingdom
- Founder: Naomi Heaton
- Headquarters: Ogle Street, London, United Kingdom
- Key people: Naomi Heaton - Chair; Liam Monaghan - Managing Director
- Services: Real estate investment, property sourcing and acquisition, development, refurbishment and interior design, letting and rental management, real estate investment funds
- Website: www.londoncentralportfolio.com

LCP Private Office (formerly London Central Portfolio) is a UK real estate investment firm, founded in 1990 by Naomi Heaton and operating in central London.

The company's services comprise real estate investment, property sourcing and acquisition, development, refurbishment and interior design, letting and rental management. LCP also advises listed real estate investment funds, including the UK's first sharia-compliant residential property funds.

== History ==
LCP Private Office (LCP) was founded to offer an integrated residential property acquisition, development, letting and management service.

LCP launched its first fund—the London Central Portfolio Property Fund—in 2007 and its second fund—the London Central Residential Recovery Fund—in 2010.

LCP has also launched two sharia-compliant residential funds, including the first in the UK.

LCP launched its London Central Apartments III fund in July 2016.

== Other activities ==
LCP undertakes research and analysis on the UK property market used by BBC Radio 4's Today Programme, BBC News, Sky News, the London Evening Standard, the Guardian; CNBC, Metro, the Daily Telegraph, the Sunday Times and the Financial Times.
