= Mary Heaton =

Mary Heaton may refer to:

- Mary Frances Heaton (1801–1878), Englishwoman who was committed to an insane asylum in 1837 for insulting an Anglican vicar and was never released
- Mary Margaret Heaton (1836–1883), English art historian
- Mary Heaton (gymnast) (1911–1989), British gymnast who competed at the 1936 Summer Olympics

== See also ==
- Mary Eaton (disambiguation)
- Mary Heaton Vorse (1874–1966), American journalist, labor activist, social critic, and novelist
