= Kelly Heaton =

- Born: 1972 (age 53–54); Chapel Hill, North Carolina, United States
- Education: B.A. 1994 Yale University; M.S. 2000 MIT Media Laboratory
- Awards: Jacob K. Javits Fellowship; L'Oreal Promotion Prize in the Art and Science of Color (2001)

Kelly Heaton (born 1972) is a sculptor, scientist, perfumer, and spiritualist known for her combination of visual art with analog electrical engineering. She is the owner and perfumer for The Virginia Perfume Company.

== Education ==
Heaton received her Bachelor of Arts degree from Yale University in 1994, and her Master of Science from the Massachusetts Institute of Technology in 2000.

She was awarded a Jacob K. Javits Fellowship to attend the Master of Fine Arts program at the School of the Museum of Fine Arts at Tufts University in Boston, Massachusetts. Heaton went on to study at the MIT Media Lab and graduated with a MS from MIT in 2000.

The subject of her Master's thesis was "physical pixels", a sculptural effort to liberate computer graphics from the flat screen of a computer monitor. Heaton's suite of prototypes included the "Digital Palette" for sequencing loops of colored-light animation, and "Peano", a system of reconfigurable blocks, each of which behaved as an RGB pixel. In 2001, her thesis work was awarded the L'Oreal Promotion Prize in the Art and Science of Color.

== Career ==
In the early 2000s, Heaton developed a reputation for complex, obsessive and often humorous installations involving technology. During her time at the MIT Center for Advanced Visual Studies, she worked with engineer Steven Gray to create her first major sculpture: "The Pool" of "Reflection Loop", a large concave slab embedded with 400 reprogrammed Furby dolls arranged in the pattern of water molecules. The Furby dolls were altered to mirror the presence of a viewer, creating a noisy, amusing and weird reflection of the audience until the robotic toys eventually "died" from excessive use. "Reflection Loop" was selected for the 2001 Annual Exhibition of the DeCordova Museum and Sculpture Park in Lincoln, Massachusetts. Shortly thereafter, Heaton was offered her first solo exhibition in New York at Bitforms gallery.

Heaton went on to numerous shows and residencies, including the now-defunct Art Interactive in Cambridge, Massachusetts, and a joint appointment with the Department of Computer Science and Department of Information Science and Information Studies at Duke University. In 2003, Heaton's installation "Live Pelt" premiered at Ronald Feldman Fine Arts in New York City. The central piece of the show was a coat ("The Surrogate") made from 64 used Tickle Me Elmo dolls that Heaton "trapped" on online auction while documenting every detail of her transactions with other eBay members. The acquired Elmo dolls were eviscerated for their furry pelts and laughing electronics, all of which Heaton re-engineered into a coat that giggles and quivers when touched, like a surrogate lover. Filmmakers Shambhavi Kaul and Joshua Gibson collaborated with Heaton to document the various personalities of her process.

In early 2004, Heaton moved to Switzerland, where she lived and worked until 2009 as a part-time innovation consultant for the Diabetes Care division of Roche Diagnostics. During this time, she co-authored several patents related to methods of data visualization for continuous glucose data. Heaton also taught herself analog electrical engineering and developed another body of work, "The Parallel Series".

Heaton's 2015 exhibition, "Pollination" involved sculpture, electronics, perfume, and mixed media art. The exhibition included "The Beekeeper", a floor-to-ceiling kinetic sculpture that Heaton referred to as "an energetic self-portrait".

== Personal life ==
Heaton lives in New York, NY.

== Solo exhibitions ==
- 2015 Ronald Feldman Fine Arts, New York, NY, "Pollination," September 12 – October 17.
- 2013 Ronald Feldman Fine Arts, New York, NY, "ADAA The Art Show 2013," Park Avenue Armory, March 6–10.
- 2012 Ronald Feldman Fine Arts, New York, NY, "The Parallel Series," September 8 – October 27.
- 2003 Ronald Feldman Fine Arts, New York, NY, "Live Pelt," September 6 – October 11. Howard Yezerski Gallery, Boston, MA, Dead Pelt, April 25 – May 27.
- 2002 bitforms gallery, New York, NY, "Reflection Loop," January 17 – February 16. 2001 MIT Council of the Arts, Cambridge, MA, Reflection Loop, October.

== Group exhibitions ==
- 2015 21c Museum, Louisville, KY, "The Art of Idea Festival," August 21 – October 11.
- 2013 The Science Gallery, Dublin, Ireland, "Oscillator," February 7 – April 14.
- 2011 Ronald Feldman Fine Arts at Seven, Miami Art Week, Miami, FL, November 29 – December 4.
- 2011 Ronald Feldman Fine Arts, New York, NY, "Taking Shape," June 25 – July 29.
- 2011 Ronald Feldman Fine Arts, New York, NY, "En-Garde II: omg," January 8 – February 5.
- 2010 Ronald Feldman Fine Arts at Seven, Miami Art Week, Miami, FL, En-Garde, November 30 – December 5.
- 2010 Ronald Feldman Fine Arts, New York, NY, "Resurrectine," May 15 – June 26.
- 2009 Lift09 Conference, Geneva, Switzerland, Lift09 Experience, February 25–27.
- 2009 Ronald Feldman Fine Arts, New York, NY, "BLACK&WHITEWORKS," June 6 – July 31.
- 2009 David Winton Bell Gallery, Brown University, Providence, RI, "Inappropriate Covers," April 11 – May 24.
- 2008 Ronald Feldman Fine Arts, New York, NY, "Drawing Review: 37 Years of Works on Paper," November 22 – December 23.
- 2006 Ben Maltz Gallery at Otis College of Art and Design, Los Angeles, CA, "From the Island of Misfit Toys," February 11 – April 15.
- 2005 Esther M. Klein Art Gallery, University City Science Center, Philadelphia, PA, "The Americas," January 14 – February 25.
- 2004 Galeria Galou, Brooklyn, NY, "The Americas," September 9 – October 3.
- 2002 Borusan Art Gallery, Istanbul, Turkey, "Fetish: Human Fantastic," October 17 – November 30.
- 2002 Alysia Duckler Gallery, Portland, OR, "Toyland," Curated by Sean Elwood, September 5 – 28.
- 2001 The Mills Gallery, Boston, MA, "17th Biennial Drawing Show," December 15 – January 24, 2002.
- 2001 MIT Weisner Building, Cambridge, MA, Council of the Arts at MIT 29th Annual Meeting, October 25.
- 2001 DeCordova Museum, Lincoln, MA, "2001 Annual Exhibition," June 9 – September 3.
- 2000 The Hargate Center at St. Paul's School, Concord, NH, "Art in the 90s," January.
- 1999 MIT Media Laboratory, Cambridge, MA, "Organic Form," December. Art Director's Club, New York, NY, Organic Information, April.
- 1998 MIT Media Laboratory, Cambridge, MA, "Numeric Photography," December.
- 1998 The School of the Museum of Fine Arts, Boston, MA, "Drawing Show," November.
- 1996 Durham Art Guild, Durham, NC, "40th Annual Juried Art Exhibition," November.

== Awards and grants ==
- 2002 Creative Capital Grant recipient
- 2002 LEF Foundation Grant recipient
- 2001 L'Oreal Promotion Prize in the Art and Science of Color
- 1997 Jacob K. Javits Fellowship for graduate study in Fine Arts
