= Prostate Cancer UK =

United Kingdom charitable organisation

- Founded: 1996
- Founder: Professor Jonathan Waxman
- Type: Charitable organisation
- Registration no.: England and Wales: 1005541; Scotland: SC039332
- Purpose: Cancer research Cancer awareness Cancer support
- Location: 53 Tooley Street, London SE1 2QN
- Coordinates: 51.505527°N 0.084486°W
- Patron: The Duchess of Gloucester
- Key people: Angela Culhane (CEO)
- Revenue: £36.016 million (2020)
- Employees: 212 (2020)
- Volunteers: 2003 (2020)
- Website: prostatecanceruk.org
- Formerly called: The Prostate Cancer Charity; Prostate Action

Prostate Cancer UK is a prostate cancer research, awareness and support organisation which is a registered charity in England and Wales, as well as in Scotland.

== History ==
The organisation was founded in 1996 as The Prostate Cancer Charity by Professor Jonathan Waxman. The charity merged with Prostate Action in 2012 to form the current organisation.

As of 2021, EDF Energy is currently in a partnership with the charity, which will run until December 2022.

== Work ==
In 2021, the charity funded a study investigating why black men are twice as likely as other men to develop prostate cancer. The charity also launched its Clinical Champions program, where the charity provides funding and training to selected people.
