= Strong American Schools =

American non-profit organization that promotes sound education policies

Strong American Schools, a project of Rockefeller Philanthropy Advisors, is a nonprofit organization supported by The Eli and Edythe Broad Foundation and the Bill & Melinda Gates Foundation that seeks to promote sound education policies for all Americans. Through its “ED in 08” information and nonpartisan advocacy campaign, it sought to inspire a debate about America’s schools and to make education a top priority in the 2008 presidential election.

== Steering committee ==
Roy Romer, the former governor of Colorado and a former chairman of the Democratic National Committee, serves as chairman of the organization. Marc S. Lampkin, the deputy campaign manager for the 2000 Bush-Cheney presidential campaign, acts as the executive director.

Strong American Schools / ED in 08 Steering Committee
Roy Romer

Chairman
Former Governor of Colorado
Former Superintendent of Los Angeles Unified School District

Eli Broad

Founder, The Broad Foundations

Allan Golston

President of U.S. Program, the Bill & Melinda Gates Foundation

Janet Murguía

President and CEO, National Council of La Raza

Louis Gerstner

Former CEO of IBM

John Engler

Former Governor of Michigan
President of the National Association of Manufacturers

Marc Lampkin

Executive Director

== Campaign goal ==
The stated goal of the campaign is to achieve nationwide debate on education reform during which every presidential candidate addresses three priorities for improving education:

- Agreeing on American education standards
- Providing effective teachers in every classroom
- Giving students more time and support for learning

== Details ==
Strong American Schools ran its information campaign like a presidential campaign, but would not support or oppose any candidate for public office and would not take positions on legislation. The Broad and Bill & Melinda Gates Foundations committed up to $60 million to fund the effort. Strong American Schools and the ED in 08 campaign were the successors to the STAND UP campaign launched in 2006, and had a headquarters staff in Washington, DC, and field offices in Manchester, NH and in Des Moines, IA.

The campaign was shuttered in March 2009, once it had served its purpose.

== See also ==
- 2008 United States presidential election
