= Henry Heaton =

Amateur mathematician (1846–1927)

Henry C Heaton
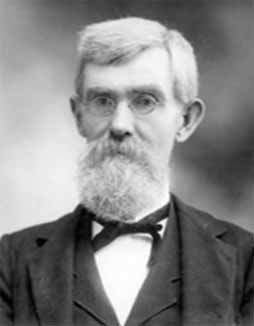
- Born: April 19, 1846; Millsboro, Pennsylvania, United States
- Died: January 27, 1927 (aged 80); Biddle, Montana, USA
- Known for: Problem solver
- Spouse: Mary Ann Marker
- Parent(s): Weaver Heaton and Rebecca Naylor Sharp
- Scientific career
- Fields: Mathematics

Henry Heaton (or Henry C Heaton) (1846–1927) was a North-American amateur mathematician who contributed problems and solutions to the then-new journals The Analyst (now Annals of Mathematics) and The American Mathematical Monthly. The Annals eventually became a leading research journal and the Monthly famous for its problems section.

== Life and work ==
Heaton was a son of a millwright. In 1852 the family moved to Greenfields, Pennsylvania, where Heaton attended the school four months every winter until he was fourteen years old. At the age of eighteen, he began his two careers, as a carpenter and as a teacher. He studied also for his BS in the Mount Union College in Ohio in the course 1866–1867. In 1869 he moved to Taylor, Iowa. After, he moved to Des Moines, Iowa where he met Joel E. Hendricks, the founder and editor of The Analyst who encouraged him to publish mathematical problems and solutions in the journal. In 1877 he and his family were living in Sabula, Iowa; in 1879 in Atlantic, Iowa; in 1881 in Lewis, Iowa; in 1906 in Belfield, North Dakota; and, finally, he died in Biddle, Montana in 1927

From 1874 to 1918, Heaton published about one hundred solutions to mathematical problems in The Analyst and in The American Mathematical Monthly.

== Bibliography ==
- Heaton, Henry (1896). "A Method of Solving Quadratic Equations". The American Mathematical Monthly. 3 (10): 236–237. doi:10.1080/00029890.1896.11998825. ISSN 0002-9890. JSTOR 2971099.
- Krantz, Steven G.; Parks, Harold R. (2014). A Mathematical Odyssey. Springer. ISBN 978-1-4614-8938-2.
