= Anne Heaton =

Anne Heaton may refer to:

- Anne Heaton (ballet dancer) (1930–2020), British ballet dancer and teacher
- Anne Heaton (folk singer), American folk singer-songwriter
