= Mick Heaton =

English footballer

Personal information
- Full name: James Michael Heaton
- Date of birth: 15 January 1947
- Place of birth: Tinsley, England
- Date of death: 11 April 1995 (aged 48)
- Place of death: Oswaldtwistle, England
- Position: Full-back

Youth career
- Sheffield Schoolboys

Senior career*
| Years | Team | Apps | (Gls) |
| 1964-71 | Sheffield United | 42 | (0) |
| 1971-1976 | Blackburn Rovers | 168 | (1) |
- * Club domestic league appearances and goals

James Michael Heaton (15 January 1947 – 11 April 1995) was an English football full-back. He played in the Football League for Blackburn Rovers and captained them to the 1975 Third Division Championship. He later coached Blackburn and Everton alongside Howard Kendall, and was an integral, yet underrated part of the Everton management team that won two league titles, an FA Cup, and a European Cup Winner's Cup. Heaton died in a car accident in 1995
