= Heaton, Arizona =

Populated place in Pinal County, Arizona

- Populated Place
- Location within the state of Arizona Heaton (the United States)
- Coordinates: 33°04′44″N 112°08′05″W
- Country: United States
- State: Arizona
- County: Pinal
- Elevation: 1,198 ft (365 m)
- Time zone: UTC-7 (Mountain (MST))
  - Summer (DST): UTC-7 (MST)
- Area code: 520
- FIPS code: 04-32285
- GNIS feature ID: 24456

Heaton is a populated place situated in Pinal County, Arizona, United States. It has an estimated elevation of 1,197 feet (365 m) above sea level.

== History ==
Originally called Maricopa Station, it served as a stop on the railroad line, where passengers transferred to stagecoach. The post office at this location was simply named Maricopa. During a land boom in the late 1880s, it was thought that this stop would become a railway stop on the line directly connecting to Phoenix. As expansion into a town was being considered if the planned rail connection became reality, the expanded community was to be named Maricopaville. In 1887, when the rail line connection went to Maricopa Junction (present day Maricopa) instead, the town's expansion was abandoned, and the name of the town was changed to its current Heaton.
