= Jonathan Waxman (oncologist) =

British physician, oncologist and author

Jonathan Hugh Waxman OBE (born 1951), is a British oncologist. He is the founder and president of Prostate Cancer UK, is emeritus Professor of Oncology at Imperial College London, and author of four novels including The Elephant in the Room. He is a clinician who has helped develop new treatments for cancer, which are now part of standard practice.

== Early life ==
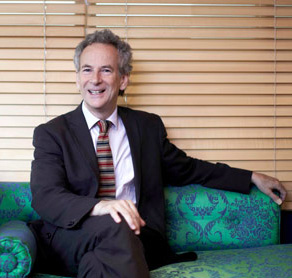
Professor Jonathan Waxman, founder and president of Prostate Cancer UK and emeritus Professor of Oncology at Imperial College London.

Jonathan Waxman was born in 1951 in Hampstead, London. His father was a psychiatrist who worked at the Central Middlesex Hospital. He was educated at Haberdashers' Aske's School, Elstree, and at age of 17 he went to University College London Medical School, winning a scholarship and two prizes. After qualification as a doctor he worked briefly in Cambridge before returning to the capital and finding employment in North London Teaching hospitals.

== Initial professional career ==
In 1981, Waxman embarked upon post-graduate research at St Bartholomew's Hospital, London, beginning by studying the effects of chemotherapy on fertility in cancer patients. He found that patients with lymphoma were sterilised by treatment; they were cured of the cancer but rendered infertile.

By coincidence, a new drug had been under development that was intended to stimulate puberty. When tested in animals however it was found to have the opposite effect and further development had been stopped. Waxman used the drug to switch off the activity of testes and ovaries in patients about to have chemotherapy, in the hope that it would prevent its sterilising effect.

Recognising its potential, he then used the drug in cancers where tumour growth depended upon the hormones made by the testes and ovaries. He found the drug – a Gonadotropin-releasing hormone agonist – to be active in prostate cancer. He was the first clinician in Europe to report the clinical effects of this new medicine which, 30 years on, is still the drug of first choice in the treatment of patients with prostate cancer. The drug replaced castration which was the treatment at the time, providing a humane alternative to surgery.

== Research ==
In 1986, Waxman became a consultant at the Hammersmith Hospital, moving to Imperial College in 2011 where he became the Flow Foundation Professor of Oncology. He established a clinical and laboratory research programme, leading a laboratory research team with the goal to understand the mechanisms underlying the growth of prostate cancer, whilst continuing to carry out duties in the clinical environment. Active in the care of patients and running numerous clinical trials, Waxman has published around 400 research papers and book chapters, and 16 books on cancer.

== Life outside medicine ==
In 1996, Waxman established The Prostate Cancer Charity, the first United Kingdom national organisation promoting research and patient support for prostate cancer. The organisation has since merged with Prostate Action, becoming Prostate Cancer UK, the biggest organisation of its kind in the UK. In 2014 the organisation employed 170 people and had an annual income of £32 million. Prostate Cancer UK lobbies for change in the environment for prostate cancer patients, funds research and provides a national and regional patient support and information service. Prostate Cancer UK is a beneficiary of the Movember Appeal, a multinational organisation dedicated to improving men's health.

Waxman helped establish the All-party Parliamentary Group on Cancer, the organisation behind the Britain Against Cancer movement. He has also written a medical law book, a novel and a book of short stories entitled The Elephant in the Room, published in October 2011.

The Elephant in the Room was inspired by J. G. Ballard, author of Empire of the Sun and Crash. Waxman treated Ballard for prostate cancer until his death in 2009, and their treatment room conversations led to the proposal of a co-written book to be titled Conversations with my Physician: the Meaning, if any, of Life. When Ballard became too ill to complete the book, Waxman decided to finish it in tribute to his friend.

Waxman has written for a number of national newspapers and frequently appears on TV and radio to comment on health matters.

Waxman was appointed Officer of the Order of the British Empire (OBE) in the 2023 New Year Honours for services to prostate cancer awareness and treatment.
