= Pro Mujer =

Nonprofit organization for women's rights in Latin America

Pro Mujer, Inc.
- Type: 501(c)(3) organization
- Founded: 1990 in El Alto, Bolivia
- Founder: Lynne Patterson; Carmen Velasco
- Headquarters: New York, NY
- Area served: Latin America
- Key people: Carmen Correa (CEO)
- Revenue: 73,791,330 United States dollar (2022)
- Total assets: 255,520,518 United States dollar (2022)
- Website: https://promujer.org

Pro Mujer is a nonprofit development organization that provides financial inclusion, health and education programs to low-income women in Latin America. One of the largest women's organizations in the region, Pro Mujer operates in Argentina, Bolivia, Mexico, Nicaragua, Peru and Guatemala with headquarters in New York City. Since its founding in 1990, Pro Mujer has disbursed more than $4 billion in small loans, provided over 10 million health interventions and impacted more than 2 million women across the region.

== Mission ==
Pro Mujer’s mission is “to empower underserved women to realize their full potential.” In 2017, Pro Mujer turned to a new organizational strategy with a mandate to build a large-scale and sustainable platform that provides relevant and transformative products and services to women throughout their life cycle. Through a focus on alliances and technology, Pro Mujer is expanding its services by entering new areas, including digital literacy, gender-based violence prevention, and workforce development.

== History ==
Pro Mujer was founded in 1990 in El Alto, Bolivia by two school teachers, Lynne Patterson, an American, and Carmen Velasco, a Bolivian. Their initial training programs focused on helping women develop invaluable life skills in business, health and leadership. Patterson and Velasco believed that women were key to breaking the cycle of poverty. In order to do this, women first needed to be the leading protagonists of their own lives and needed easy and convenient access to basic human services. Patterson and Velasco provided a space where women could connect with one another for mutual support and encouragement. It was not long before the women they served requested access to capital in order to put theory into practice.

A small grant from USAID in 1990 allowed Patterson and Velasco to add microfinance to their offerings, while similar support from the Bolivian government enabled them to maintain their health and human development services. At that time, the microfinance movement was burgeoning and industry leaders told them to eliminate the health and human development components and focus solely on microfinance, but the advice went unheeded. The communities continued to embraced their grassroots initiatives and in 1996 they replicated their program in Nicaragua.

In 1997, Pro Mujer established its international headquarters in New York City, and consequently expanded into more countries; Peru in 1999, Mexico in 2001, Argentina in 2005 and Guatemala in 2018. In 2009, Patterson was honored by the Inter-American Development Bank (IDB) as a “Woman Microfinance Pioneer in Latin America” and in 2007, both Patterson and Velasco were jointly recognized as “Community Crusaders” at the annual “CNN Heroes: An All-Star Tribute” ceremony.

== Products and services ==
Pro Mujer offers a holistic package of services that includes financial services, such as small loans, savings, and insurance; capacity-building education, such as trainings in soft and hard business skills, and financial and digital literacy; and accessible preventative health services, particularly for chronic diseases such as hypertension, diabetes, sexual and reproductive health problems and breast and cervical cancers, among other illnesses.

== Health Services ==
Pro Mujer's health program provides low-income women in Latin America access to low-cost and high-quality services, such as lab tests, ultrasounds and dental care, in the neighborhoods where they live and work. Its health strategy prioritizes preventive care and regular cancer screenings as a means to tackle chronic disease, a leading cause of death in Latin America.

In October 2009, Pro Mujer embarked upon an ambitious project to rework its health model in Nicaragua. The aim of this innovative health pilot was to provide clients with comprehensive and affordable primary health care services while addressing the increasingly serious problem of chronic disease. The pilot provided patients and their families with high-quality, low-cost health care that could be easily replicated in other communities in Latin America. Between October 2009 and October 2010, PATH provided technical expertise in analyzing the market and developing key health elements of the program while Global Partnerships and the Linked Foundation provided invaluable support and funding.

After extensive research and analysis, Pro Mujer rolled out the newly-designed model in October 2010 at one of Pro Mujer’s community centers in Leon, Nicaragua. The success of the pilot then led to the expansion of this health model to all Pro Mujer countries of operation.

== Financial Services ==
Pro Mujer’s services are offered primarily through a communal bank, or village banking, methodology. Prior to receiving loans, women form small solidarity groups of three to five women by inviting close friends, neighbors and relatives. They name their group and elect leaders including a President, Secretary, and Treasurer. These positions rotate so that each member has the opportunity to take on a leadership role.

These groups meet regularly for loan disbursement and repayment meetings. Members learn the rules of borrowing and saving. Working closely with Pro Mujer loan officers, each woman develops an informal business plan showing how she will invest her first loan. In addition, the groups form credit committees to review and approve new members and they guarantee one another’s loans. In the event that one member cannot make a payment, these peer groups guarantee one another’s loans. As of 2017, the average client repayment rate was more than 97% across all five countries where Pro Mujer operates; underscoring the effectiveness of this methodology.
