= Penny Heaton =

American physician

Penny M. Heaton
- Education: University of Louisville School of Medicine
- Scientific career
- Workplaces: Johnson & Johnson; Novavax; Novartis; Bill & Melinda Gates Foundation Merck & Co; Centers for Disease Control and Prevention

Penny M. Heaton is an American physician who is the Global Therapeutics Lead for Vaccines at Johnson & Johnson. She previously worked at Novavax, Novartis and the Bill & Melinda Gates Foundation. She was included by Stat News on their definitive list of leaders in the life sciences in 2022.

== Early life and education ==
Heaton has said that she was inspired to work on vaccine development after hearing her father suffered from tuberculosis before she was born. She has credited her high school science teachers with teaching her the importance of blind controlled trials. She was an undergraduate and medical student at the University of Louisville School of Medicine. She remained there as a medical resident in pediatrics. She worked as a services officer for Epidemic Intelligence at the Centers for Disease Control and Prevention, studying food-borne viruses in infants born to HIV positive mothers. She went on to work in Kenya, where she investigated the roll-out of vaccines in impoverished populations in Kisumu.

== Career ==
On returning to the United States, Heaton joined Merck & Co. Under her leadership the foundation developed the vaccine for rotavirus and delivered the Rotavirus Safety and Efficacy Trials. The vaccine was recommended by the World Health Organization for all infants around the world, and was predicted to save almost two million lives over the course of ten years.

Heaton was made Global Head of Vaccine Research Clusters at Novartis where she worked on maternal immunization, with a particular focus on Group B streptococcal infection. She worked on vaccines against Meningococcal meningitis, including Bexsero and Men.

After 3 years at Novartis, Heaton joined the Bill & Melinda Gates Foundation as Director of Vaccine Development and focssed on developing vaccines for diseases that impact the world's most vulnerable communities.

Heaton was made chief executive officer of the Bill & Melinda Gates Foundation Medical Research Institute in 2017. She was recruited as global lead for vaccines at Johnson & Johnson in 2021.

== Awards and honors ==
- 2018 University of Louisville School of Medicine Alumni of the Year
- 2020 National Foundation for Infectious Diseases Jimmy and Rosalynn Carter Award Recipient
- 2020 Pediatric Infectious Diseases Society Distinguished Research Award
- 2022 Stat News Status List

== Selected publications ==
- Penny M Heaton (14 July 2020). "The Covid-19 Vaccine-Development Multiverse". The New England Journal of Medicine. doi:10.1056/nejme2025111. ISSN 0028-4793. PMID 32663910. Wikidata Q97556673.
- Dimitrios Gouglas; Tung Thanh Le; Klara Henderson; et al. (18 October 2018). "Estimating the cost of vaccine development against epidemic infectious diseases: a cost minimisation study". The Lancet Global Health. 6 (12): e1386–e1396. doi:10.1016/s2214-109x(18)30346-2. ISSN 2214-109X. PMC 7164811. PMID 30342925. Wikidata Q57813734.
- Timo Vesikari; David O Matson; Penelope H. Dennehy; et al. (1 January 2006). "Safety and efficacy of a pentavalent human-bovine (WC3) reassortant rotavirus vaccine". The New England Journal of Medicine. 354 (1): 23–33. doi:10.1056/nejmoa052664. ISSN 0028-4793. PMID 16394299. Wikidata Q40489497.
