= Thomas Heaton (footballer, born 1897) =

English footballer

Personal information
- Full name: Thomas Heaton
- Date of birth: 2 June 1897
- Place of birth: Blackburn, England
- Position: Wing half

Senior career*
Years	Team	Apps	(Gls)
1919–1923	Blackburn Rovers	57	(1)
1923–1927	Oldham Athletic	59	(3)
1927	Manchester North End		
1928	Toronto District		
Total		116	(4)
- * Club domestic league appearances and goals

Thomas Heaton (2 June 1897–unknown) was an English footballer who played in the Football League for Blackburn Rovers and Oldham Athletic.
