= Heaton (gamer) =

Swedish esports player and manager

HeatoN
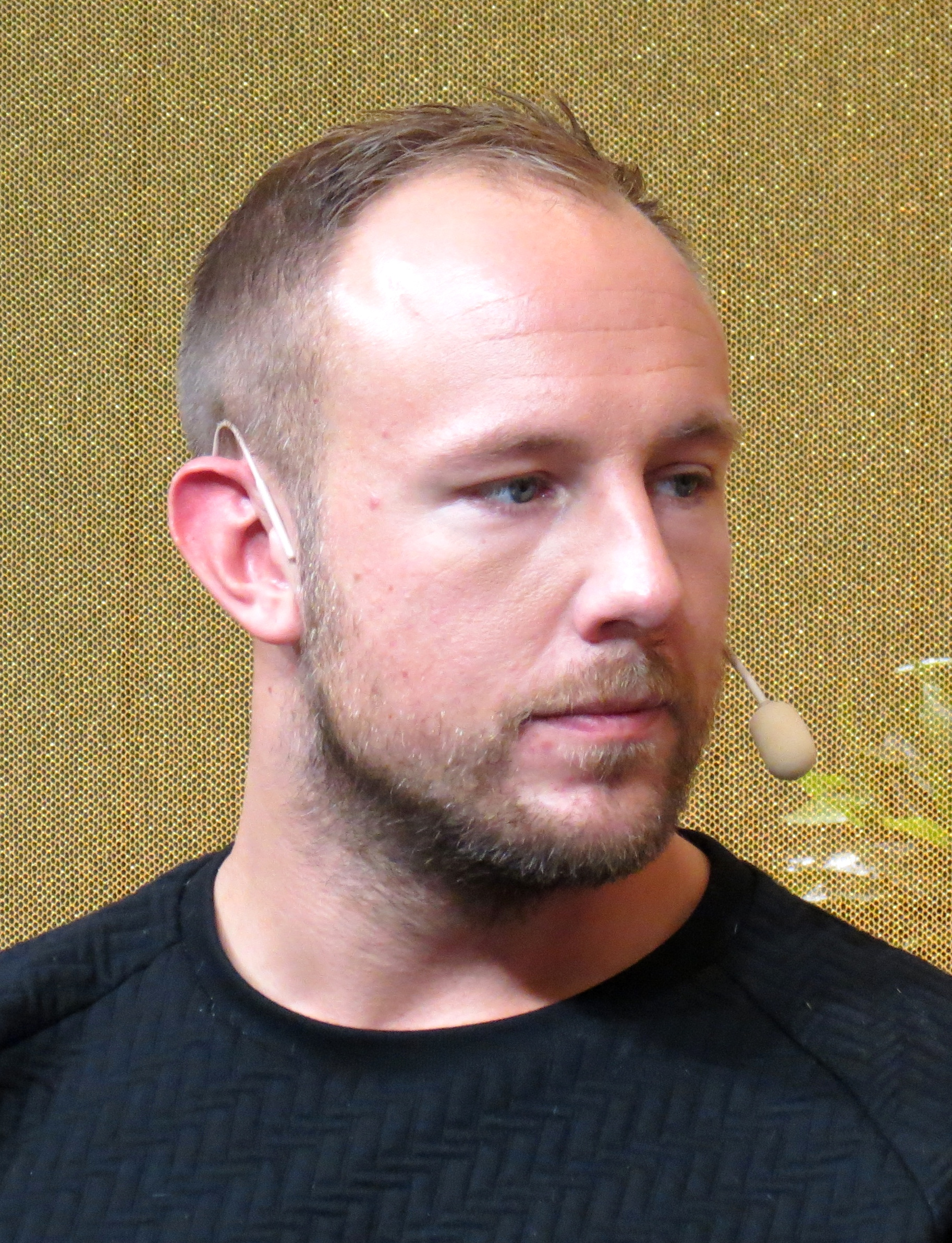

Personal information
- Name: Emil Christensen
- Born: 14 June 1984 (age 42); Huddinge, Sweden
- Nationality: Swedish

Career information
- Games: Counter-Strike
- Playing career: 2001–2007
- Coaching career: 2007

Team history

As player:
- 2001–2002: Ninjas in Pyjamas
- 2002–2004: SK Gaming
- 2005–2007: Ninjas in Pyjamas

As coach:
- 2007: Ninjas in Pyjamas

Career highlights and awards
- HLTV Hall of Fame inductee (2024)

Emil Pathric William Christensen, also known as HeatoN, (born 14 June 1984) is a Swedish esports manager and former professional Counter-Strike player, who played as captain of the gaming team Ninjas in Pyjamas (NiP). HeatoN was the manager of NiP up until October 2018 when he decided to part ways with the organisation to focus on his own brand. He is widely considered one of the best Counter-Strike players of all time.

== Playing career ==
The name HeatoN comes from a brand of equipment, which is now owned by CCM, he used when he played ice hockey. Christensen's first hobby was ice hockey, but he retired because of an injury. A friend (CS player fRa1L, from RevolutioN) told him to try Counter-Strike. Christensen was part of the original Ninjas in Pyjamas team of 2001 which won the Cyberathlete Professional League World Championship that year. He and the other members of Ninjas in Pyjamas went on to become the foundation to the highly successful SK Sweden, one of the most successful teams in electronic sports history. Christensen led SK Gaming to the World Cyber Games Counter-Strike championship in 2003 and to 4th place in 2004.

HeatoN and NiP competed in the World Series of Video Games (WSVG).

Christensen was nominated for Best Counter-Strike Player of the Year in 2004, losing out to SK Gaming teammate, Tommy "potti'" Ingemarsson. He was selected for the Global Gaming League European Counter-Strike All-Star team in 2005.

At the beginning of 2005, he and the rest of SK Sweden chose not to renew their contracts with SK Gaming and re-formed NiP. Since then some of the NiP players moved back to SK Gaming but Christensen and others have stayed on at Ninjas in Pyjamas. NiP are now competing at professional LAN tournaments again, after a hiatus in which SpawN joined after HeatoN decided to take time off for personal reasons.

Christensen, along with the other members of Ninjas in Pyjamas, assisted in the design of the SteelSound 5H (USB) Headphones produced by SteelSeries.

In December 2006, he travelled to New York and Dallas to provide support for his teammates as they competed in the World Series of Video Games (WSVG) world finals and CPL winter respectively. NiP were expected to be strong contenders in both tournaments, however bowed out uncharacteristically early.

In June 2016, HeatoN became the first person inducted into the ESL Hall of Fame.

== Managing career ==
In September 2007, HeatoN quit playing Counter-Strike to be coach of NiP but was then offered a chance to be a general manager for Stockholm in the Championship Gaming Series (CGS). HeatoN's CGS franchise was called the Stockholm Magnetik and had a Counter-Strike: Source team, one male and one female Dead or Alive 4 player, a FIFA 08 player, and two Forza Motorsport 2 players.

After the CGS's folding in late 2008 Christensen moved to promote a computer hardware company named Qpad, from his native country Sweden, for the first part of 2009. Later in the year however, he left Qpad to join with his former teammate Abdisamad "SpawN" Mohamed in product development at ZOWIE GEAR which is a manufacturer of competitive gaming gear, founded late 2008. In July 2010, ZOWIE GEAR announced HeatoN's first series of mice co-developed by himself called EC after player's initials. In March 2012 ZOWIE GEAR announced a new version of the EC series, named the EC eVo series which features an improved optical sensor and was released in April.

In 2012, Christensen returned to Ninjas in Pyjamas and became the organization's manager.

In September 2015, Christensen and two other formers NiP owners were charged with misleading an auditor about Ninjas in Pyjamas AB's finances during its sale to Diglife. Christensen was found guilty of fraud, and was sentenced pay a fine and perform community service.

During the end of summer 2019, former and current players of Ninjas in Pyjamas stepped forward accusing Christensen and other leaders of the organisation of purposely withholding money from the players. According to players, the timeslot in which they were not paid was around the same time as the fraud took place 2013-2014 (sentenced 2015). The first player that stepped forward was Robin "Fifflaren" Johansson. Shortly thereafter a number of former NiP players further corroborated the allegations made by Johansson. Some of the other players among Johansson who stepped forward include Richard "Xizt" Landström, Adam "friberg" Friberg, Christopher "GeT_RiGhT" Alesund and Patrik "f0rest" Lindberg. Christensen uploaded a video to YouTube on 22 August 2019 where he claims that it was his companion, Niklas "Fiskoo" Fischier, who was responsible for players not getting their salaries, as well as a huge tax pay up that companies and organisations in Sweden pay to the Swedish Tax Agency. Fischier denied the allegations.
