= Al G. Barnes =

Al G. Barnes may refer to:

- Alpheus George Barnes Stonehouse (1862–1931), Canadian impresario
- Al G. Barnes Circus, the traveling circus he founded
