= Sedro-Woolley, Washington =

- City
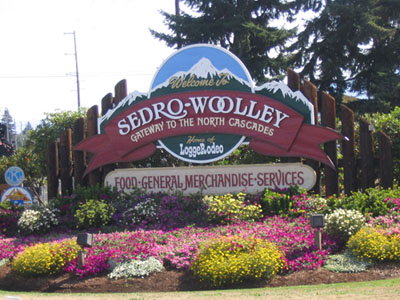
- Sedro-Woolley welcome sign, pictured in 2005
- Nickname: Woolley
- Location of Sedro-Woolley in Washington state
- Coordinates: 48°30′05″N 122°15′21″W
- Country: United States
- State: Washington
- County: Skagit
- Incorporated: December 19, 1898

Government
  - Type: Mayor–council
  - Mayor: JoEllen Kesti

Area
  - Total: 4.35 sq mi (11.26 km^{2})
  - Land: 4.34 sq mi (11.25 km^{2})
  - Water: 0 sq mi (0.00 km^{2})
- Elevation: 59 ft (18 m)

Population (2010)
  - Total: 12,421
  - Density: 2,801.7/sq mi (1,081.75/km^{2})
- Time zone: UTC-8 (PST)
  - Summer (DST): UTC-7 (PDT)
- ZIP code: 98284
- Area code: 360, 564
- FIPS code: 53-63210
- GNIS feature ID: 2411859
- Website: www.sedro-woolley.gov

Sedro-Woolley (/ˌsiːdroʊ ˈwʊli/ SEE-droh WUUL-ee) is a city in Skagit County, Washington, United States. It is part of the Mount Vernon–Anacortes, Washington Metropolitan Statistical Area and had a population of 12,421 at the 2020 census. The city is home to the administrative offices of North Cascades National Park, which lies east of Sedro-Woolley on State Route 20.

== History ==
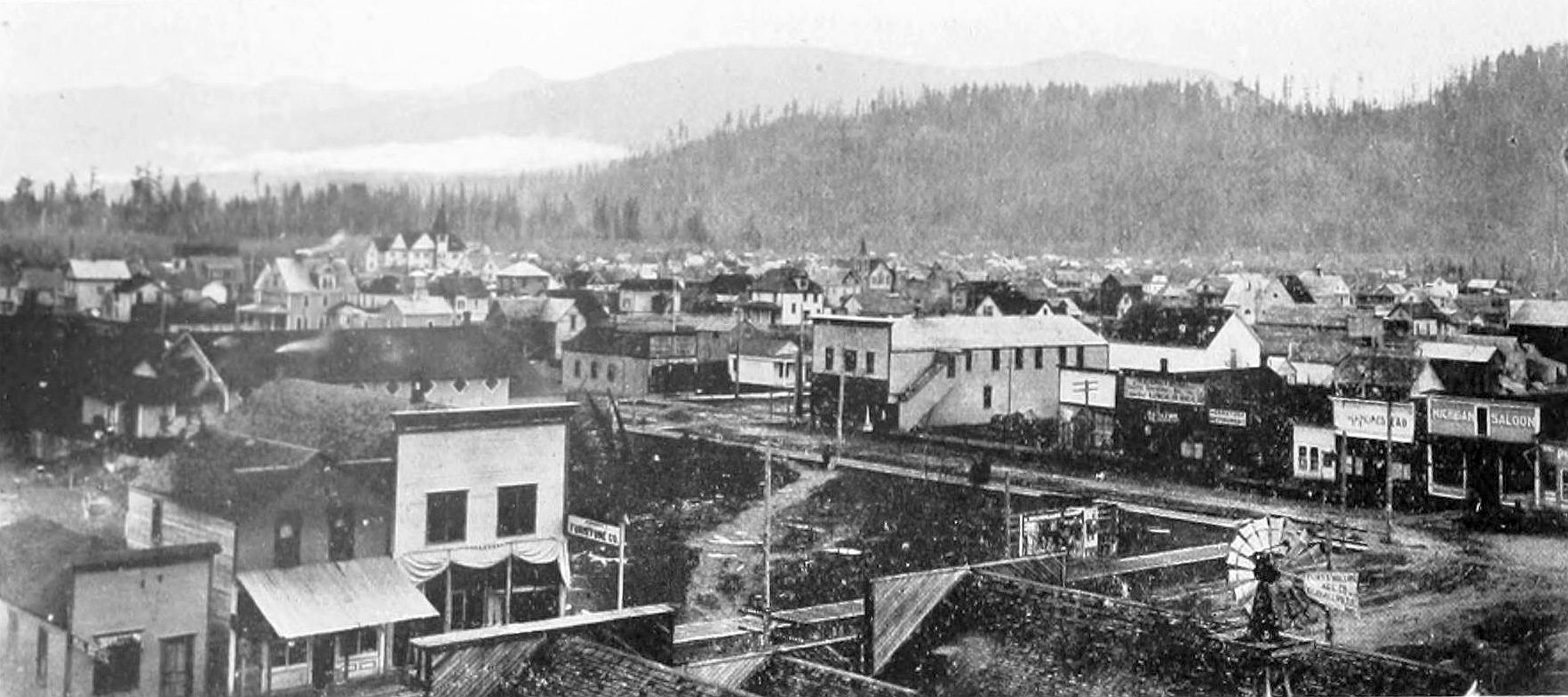
Sedro-Woolley in 1906

Incorporated on December 19, 1898, Sedro-Woolley was formed from neighboring rival towns of Sedro (once known as Bug) and Woolley in Skagit County, northwestern Washington, 25 miles (40 kilometres) inland from Puget Sound, 40 miles (64 kilometres) south of the border with Canada and 65 miles (105 kilometres) north of Seattle.

Four British bachelors, led by David Batey, homesteaded the area in 1878, the time logjam obstructions were cleared downriver at the site of Mount Vernon. In 1884–85, Batey built a store and home for the Mortimer Cook family from Santa Barbara, California where Cook had been mayor for two terms. Cook intended to name his new Pacific Northwest town Bug due to the number of mosquitoes present, but his wife protested along with a handful of other local wives. Cook was already the namesake for the town Cook's Ferry on the Thompson River in British Columbia. With "Bug" being so unpopular, Cook derived a town name from Spanish; knowing "cedro" was the word for cedar, he replaced one letter to make the name unique, settling on "Sedro".

Sedro, on the northern banks of the Skagit River, proved susceptible to floods. In 1889, Northern Pacific Railway developer Nelson Bennett began laying track from the town of Fairhaven, 25 miles (40 kilometres) northwest on Bellingham Bay, and real estate developer Norman R. Kelley platted a new town of Sedro on high ground a mile northwest of Cook's site. The Fairhaven and Southern Railroad arrived in Sedro on Christmas Eve, 1889, in time for Bennett to receive a performance bonus from the towns at both ends, and a month after Washington became the 42nd state in the Union.

Within months, two more railroads crossed the F&S roadbed a half mile north of new Sedro, forming a triangle where 11 trains eventually arrived daily. Railroad developer Philip A. Woolley moved his family from Elgin, Illinois, to Sedro in December 1899 and bought land around the triangle. He built the Skagit River Lumber & Shingle Mill next to where the railroads crossed and he started his namesake company town there that was based on sales of railroad ties to the three rail companies, including the Seattle and Northern Railway (forerunner of the Great Northern Railway) and the Northern Pacific Railroad.

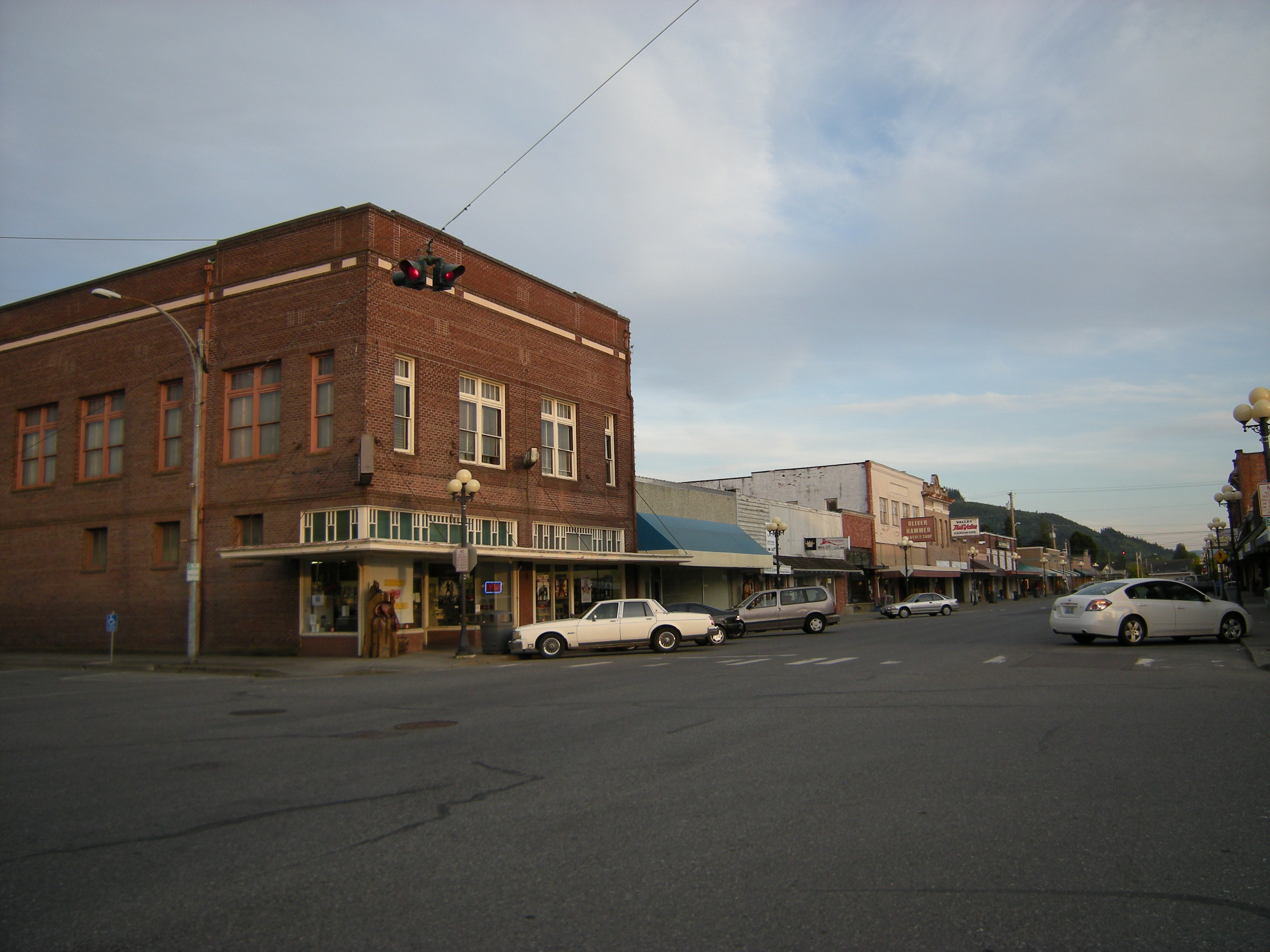
Facing southeast at the intersection of Metcalf and Woodworth Streets, downtown Sedro-Woolley, May 2009.

Meanwhile, a fourth town rose nearby when the F&S laid rails on a "wye" that led northeast from Sedro about four and a half miles to coal mines. Bennett bought the mines, along with Montana mining financier Charles X. Larrabee, and they soon sold their interests to James J. Hill, owner of the Great Northern. The resulting ore soon turned out to be more suitable for coking coal and a town began there named Cokedale. Cokedale faded in importance when the mine declined and the other towns all merged on December 19, 1898, as Sedro-Woolley.

On July 24, 1911, a fire of unknown origin began near the Fritsch Brothers Hardware store at the northwest corner of Metcalf and Woodworth Streets in the business center of the recently incorporated city. The fire quickly spread, and all but four structures within the area bounded by Eastern Avenue to the west, Ferry Street to the north, Murdock Street to the east and Woodworth Street to the south were destroyed by the flames. Twenty-five businesses sustained $200,000 in damage. Historic buildings in downtown Sedro-Woolley are now primarily composed of brick as a testament to the disaster.

On May 15, 1922, a circus elephant known as Tusko rampaged through the town after it escaped from the traveling Al G. Barnes Circus. He was the largest circus elephant in captivity at the time, measuring 10 feet 2 inches (3.10 m) tall and weighing 7.5 short tons (6,800 kg). Tusko demolished several fences, knocked down telephone poles, and destroyed a Model T. He was chased by local residents for 30 miles (48 km) in the surrounding countryside, and was captured the following morning.

After logging and coal-mining declined, the major employers and industries became the nearby Northern State Hospital (a mental-health facility) and Skagit Steel & Iron Works, which rose from the back room of a local hardware store to become a major supplier of implements and parts for logging and railroad customers. The firm manufactured machines and parts for the war effort in World War II and artillery shells, starting in 1953. By 1990, the company was gone and the hospital was closed but new industry, including robotics and aerospace, is developing north of town and on the campus of the old hospital. Current large employers in the town include BYK Construction Inc, Cascades Job Corps Center, Janicki Logging & Construction, Janicki Industries, PeaceHealth United General Medical Center District, Rothenbuhler Engineering, the Sedro-Woolley Innovation for Tomorrow (SWIFT) Center, the Sedro-Woolley School District, Sedron Technologies, Truck Vault, and the Upper Skagit Indian Tribe.

== Government ==
The City of Sedro-Woolley is a non-charter code city that operates under a mayor-council form of government with seven councilmembers. Six councilmembers are elected by wards and one is elected at-large. Each councilmember serves a four-year term. The mayor is elected at-large every four years and is responsible for the executive functions of the city. The mayor appoints a city supervisor, subject to confirmation by the city council, who is responsible for the day-to-day operations of the city and oversees the department directors. The municipal judge is appointed by the mayor, subject to confirmation of the city council, and operates independently of the other branches of government.

Sedro-Woolley is a full-service city with its own police department, fire department, wastewater treatment plant, solid waste operation, storm water division, street department, community development department, finance department, and parks department and administration. The city maintains a large number of public parks and open spaces such as Hammer Heritage Square in downtown Sedro-Woolley. Riverfront Park situated on the north bank of the Skagit River is the signature park. It consists of nearly 60 acres (240,000 m^{2}) and includes picnic shelters, baseball fields, RV park, amphitheater, and an off-leash dog park. Every year on the 4th of July the city celebrates with a festive carnival, and hosts the Loggerodeo parade.

== Geography ==
According to the United States Census Bureau, the city has a total area of 4.35 square miles (11.27 square kilometres), all of it land. The city is bordered by the Skagit River to the south. Sedro-Woolley is also nicknamed the "Gateway to the North Cascades", due to its relative proximity to the National Park to the east.

=== Climate ===
Sedro-Woolley has a warm-summer Mediterranean climate (Csb) according to the Köppen climate classification system, but nearly qualifies as having an oceanic climate (Cfb) due to its less pronounced drying trend in summer, as compared with elsewhere in western Washington.

Climate data for Sedro-Woolley
| Month | Jan | Feb | Mar | Apr | May | Jun | Jul | Aug | Sep | Oct | Nov | Dec | Year |
|---|---|---|---|---|---|---|---|---|---|---|---|---|---|
| Record high °F (°C) | 67 (19) | 74 (23) | 82 (28) | 94 (34) | 95 (35) | 99 (37) | 98 (37) | 97 (36) | 91 (33) | 86 (30) | 76 (24) | 74 (23) | 99 (37) |
| Mean daily maximum °F (°C) | 44.4 (6.9) | 48.7 (9.3) | 53.3 (11.8) | 59.6 (15.3) | 65.6 (18.7) | 70.1 (21.2) | 74.9 (23.8) | 74.9 (23.8) | 69.2 (20.7) | 60.5 (15.8) | 50.8 (10.4) | 45.6 (7.6) | 59.8 (15.4) |
| Mean daily minimum °F (°C) | 32.4 (0.2) | 33.9 (1.1) | 36.3 (2.4) | 39.9 (4.4) | 44.3 (6.8) | 48.7 (9.3) | 50.4 (10.2) | 50.5 (10.3) | 47.2 (8.4) | 42.4 (5.8) | 37.4 (3.0) | 33.9 (1.1) | 41.5 (5.3) |
| Record low °F (°C) | −2 (−19) | −1 (−18) | 8 (−13) | 25 (−4) | 25 (−4) | 30 (−1) | 31 (−1) | 34 (1) | 28 (−2) | 20 (−7) | 3 (−16) | 1 (−17) | −2 (−19) |
| Average precipitation inches (mm) | 5.75 (146) | 4.21 (107) | 4.32 (110) | 3.56 (90) | 2.86 (73) | 2.56 (65) | 1.45 (37) | 1.71 (43) | 3.05 (77) | 4.61 (117) | 6.48 (165) | 6.05 (154) | 46.6 (1,180) |
| Average snowfall inches (cm) | 3.3 (8.4) | 1.3 (3.3) | 1.4 (3.6) | 0 (0) | 0 (0) | 0 (0) | 0 (0) | 0 (0) | 0 (0) | 0 (0) | 0.7 (1.8) | 2.2 (5.6) | 8.9 (23) |
| Average precipitation days | 19 | 16 | 18 | 15 | 13 | 11 | 6 | 7 | 11 | 15 | 20 | 20 | 171 |

== Demographics ==
Historical population
| Census | Pop. | Note | %± |
|---|---|---|---|
| 1900 | 885 | | — |
| 1910 | 2,129 | | 140.6% |
| 1920 | 2,379 | | 11.7% |
| 1930 | 2,719 | | 14.3% |
| 1940 | 2,954 | | 8.6% |
| 1950 | 3,299 | | 11.7% |
| 1960 | 3,705 | | 12.3% |
| 1970 | 4,598 | | 24.1% |
| 1980 | 6,110 | | 32.9% |
| 1990 | 6,031 | | −1.3% |
| 2000 | 8,658 | | 43.6% |
| 2010 | 10,540 | | 21.7% |
| 2020 | 12,421 | | 17.8% |
| 2023 (est.) | 12,633 | | 1.7% |
Sources 1900-2023

=== 2020 census ===
As of the 2020 census, Sedro-Woolley had a population of 12,421, 4,562 households, and 2,937 families residing in the city. The population density was 2,857.4 inhabitants per square mile (1,103.2 inhabitants per square kilometre). There were 4,759 housing units at an average density of 1,094.8 per square mile (422.7 per square kilometre).

Of the 4,562 households, 34.5% had children under the age of 18 living in them; 42.6% were married-couple households, 16.9% were households with a male householder and no spouse or partner present, and 29.7% were households with a female householder and no spouse or partner present. About 27.1% of all households were made up of individuals and 13.4% had someone living alone who was 65 years of age or older. The average household size was 2.72. There was a 4.1% housing vacancy rate, with a homeowner vacancy rate of 0.9% and a rental vacancy rate of 3.9%.

The median age in the city was 34.6 years; 24.6% of residents were under the age of 18, 6.8% were between the ages of 15 and 19, 7.4% were from 20 to 24, 29.1% were from 25 to 44, 20.1% were from 45 to 64, and 15.8% were 65 years of age or older. The gender makeup of the city was 48.0% male and 52.0% female, equivalent to 92.4 males per 100 females overall and 90.4 males per 100 females age 18 and over.

97.3% of residents lived in urban areas, while 2.7% lived in rural areas.

Racial composition as of the 2020 census
| Race | Number | Percent |
|---|---|---|
| White | 9,429 | 75.9% |
| Black or African American | 104 | 0.8% |
| American Indian and Alaska Native | 188 | 1.5% |
| Asian | 150 | 1.2% |
| Native Hawaiian and Other Pacific Islander | 57 | 0.5% |
| Some other race | 1,275 | 10.3% |
| Two or more races | 1,218 | 9.8% |
| Hispanic or Latino (of any race) | 2,277 | 18.3% |

=== 2010 census ===
As of the 2010 census, there were 10,540 people, 3,995 households, and 2,609 families residing in the city. The population density was 2,766.4 inhabitants per square mile (1,068.1 inhabitants per square kilometre). There were 4,303 housing units at an average density of 1,129.4 per square mile (436.1 per square kilometre). The racial makeup of the city was 86.1% White, 0.3% African American, 1.9% Native American, 1.4% Asian, 6.8% from other races, and 3.3% from two or more races. Hispanic or Latino of any race were 14.0% of the population.

There were 3,995 households, of which 36.9% had children under the age of 18 living with them, 43.9% were married couples living together, 14.9% had a female householder with no husband present, 6.5% had a male householder with no wife present, and 34.7% were non-families. 27.0% of all households were made up of individuals, and 10.2% had someone living alone who was 65 years of age or older. The average household size was 2.59 and the average family size was 3.12.

The median age in the city was 33.7 years. 27.3% of residents were under the age of 18; 9% were between the ages of 18 and 24; 28.2% were from 25 to 44; 22.7% were from 45 to 64; and 12.7% were 65 years of age or older. The gender makeup of the city was 48.3% male and 51.7% female.

=== 2000 census ===
As of the 2000 census, there were 8,658 people, 3,205 households, and 2,176 families residing in the city. The population density was 2,547.7 people per square mile (983.7 people/km^{2}). There were 3,334 housing units at an average density of 981.1 per square mile (378.8/km^{2}). The racial makeup of the city was 91.97% White, 0.25% African American, 1.59% Native American, 0.81% Asian, 0.13% Pacific Islander, 3.25% from other races, and 2.00% from two or more races. Hispanic or Latino of any race were 7.23% of the population.

There were 3,205 households, out of which 37.5% had children under the age of 18 living with them, 49.8% were married couples living together, 13.5% had a female householder with no husband present, and 32.1% were non-families. 25.9% of all households were made up of individuals, and 12.6% had someone living alone who was 65 years of age or older. The average household size was 2.62 and the average family size was 3.14.

In the city, the age distribution of the population shows 28.8% under the age of 18, 9.2% from 18 to 24, 29.3% from 25 to 44, 18.4% from 45 to 64, and 14.3% who were 65 years of age or older. The median age was 33 years. For every 100 females, there were 90.3 males. For every 100 females age 18 and over, there were 84.8 males.

The median income for a household in the city was $37,914, and the median income for a family was $40,918. Males had a median income of $35,215 versus $23,636 for females. The per capita income for the city was $16,517. About 10.7% of families and 11.3% of the population were below the poverty line, including 12.9% of those under age 18 and 16.1% of those age 65 or over.

== Culture ==
Sedro-Woolley is the home of Loggerodeo, an annual festival that takes place near Independence Day. It was established as Sedro's Independence Day celebration in 1886 and renamed to Loggerodeo when the towns merged in 1948. The festival is the oldest continuous Independence Day celebration in Washington state. Loggerodeo includes a carnival, races, arts and crafts, parades, auctions, and logging activities. Since 1996, it has also hosted an invitational chainsaw carving competition that uses local cedar and attracts sculptors from around the world.

== Education ==
The Sedro-Woolley School District operates public schools in the city as well as nearby communities, including Big Lake and Clear Lake. The district has one high school (Sedro-Woolley High School), one middle school, seven elementary schools, and several alternative schooling programs. A Job Corps center is also located within the city.

== Transportation ==
Sedro-Woolley lies at the intersection of State Route 9, a major north–south highway in the Cascade foothills from the Seattle metropolitan area to the Canadian border, and State Route 20, also known as the North Cascades Highway. The two highways travel concurrently around the city center on Borseth and Moore streets; State Route 20 continues west towards Interstate 5, a major freeway, and east to North Cascades National Park and Eastern Washington.

Skagit Transit operates public bus service within Sedro-Woolley and surrounding communities, including connections to Skagit Station in Mount Vernon as well as areas as far east as Concrete. The agency operates a 20-stall park-and-ride lot at West Ferry Street and Cook Road near State Route 20 that is owned by the Washington State Department of Transportation. Prior to the creation of a new route in 2022, intra-city service within Sedro-Woolley often required a transfer in Burlington.

The nearest commercial airport with scheduled passenger service is Bellingham International Airport, approximately 25 miles (40 km) to the northwest.

== Notable people ==
- Darius Kinsey, photographer, resided in Sedro-Woolley from 1896 until the early 1900s
- Keith Wagoner, member of the Washington State Senate
- Philip Woolley, businessman and eponym to the Town of Woolley
- Jim Youngsman, member of the Washington House of Representatives

== See also ==
- List of cities and towns in Washington
