= Janicki Industries =

- Type: Private
- Industry: Aerospace and Defense
- Founded: 1993 (as Janicki Machine Design), Sedro-Woolley, Washington
- Founder: Peter Janicki; Susan Janicki
- Key people: Peter Janicki (founder and CEO); John Janicki (president)
- Products: Aerostructures; Aerospace Parts; Aerospace tooling
- Number of employees: More than 1,900 (2026)
- Website: janicki.com

Janicki Industries is a privately owned American aerospace and defense company headquartered in Sedro-Woolley, Washington. Founded in 1993, it makes aerostructures, aerospace tooling, composite parts and assemblies for aircraft, spacecraft, missiles and ships. It operates production facilities in Washington and Utah and in 2026 began construction of an $800 million manufacturing campus in Great Falls, Montana.

== History ==
=== Founding and Marine Tooling ===
The company was founded as Janicki Machine Design in 1993 by husband-and-wife team Peter and Susan Janicki in Sedro-Woolley. Peter’s brother John Janicki joined in 1994 and serves as president. The firm originally built large five-axis CNC mills with the intention of selling them to the boatbuilding industry. Instead, boat builders hired the company to machine hull molds and plugs, which at the time were built by hand, and Janicki introduced CNC-machined tooling to the marine industry. To this day Janicki continues to design and builds its own five-axis mills, which are among the largest of their kind in the world, and has written its own control software.

=== Expansion into Aerospace ===
In 1999 Janicki won the contract to design and build the molds for fuselage sections of the Boeing 787 Dreamliner, including eight carbon-composite mandrels for the rear fuselage. In airplane wing design meets watercaft, in 2010 the company provided the tooling for the wing sail of USA-17, the BMW Oracle Racing yacht that won the 33rd America’s Cup. After being asked in 2008 to machine large composite skins for the F-35 Lightning II program, Janicki built a $19.5 million, 100,000-square-foot plant in Layton, Utah, adjacent to Hill Air Force Base, which opened in 2011 as its dedicated machining division.

In 2014, Janicki Bioenergy (later renamed Sedron Technologies) was spun out of Janicki Industries to begin developing the Janicki Omni Processor, a waste-to-energy and water treatment system funded by the Bill & Melinda Gates Foundation.

In March 2016, the USAF announced Janicki Industries as one of the seven tier-one suppliers for the Northrop Grumman B21 Raider program.

=== Growth since 2019 ===
Janicki Industries opened a 90,000-square-foot plant in Hamilton, Washington, for composite aircraft parts in 2019, and in 2022 purchased a 251,000-square-foot facility in Bellingham, Washington. In 2025 it announced a further expansion at its Hamilton campus which created 350+ jobs. By April 2026 the company employed more than 1,900 people across more than one million square feet of production space in Washington and Utah, having more than doubled its workforce since 2022. That month it announced a multi-state growth plan including a new Mount Vernon, Washington, site, a 70,000-square-foot addition in Layton Utah.

On June 2, 2026, Janicki selected Great Falls, Montana, for an $800 million manufacturing campus on 180 acres within the city’s AgriTech Park, planned to grow to two million square feet with about 1,000 jobs in its first five years and roughly 2,000 over a decade. Construction began in July 2026.

== Recognition ==
Boeing named Janicki Industries a 2023 Supplier of the Year, presenting it with the Collaboration Award after more than 24 years as a Boeing supplier. Northrop Grumman gave Janicki Industries its Supplier Excellence Award for Strategic Excellence in 2024 and 2025.

== See Also ==
- Sedron Technologies
- Northrop Grumman B-21 Raider
- Boeing 787 Dreamliner
- Lockheed Martin F-35 Lightning II
- USA 17
- Sedro-Woolley, Washington
- Spirit AeroSystems
