= Sedro-Woolley School District =

School district in Washington state

Sedro-Woolley School District No. 101 is a public school district in Sedro-Woolley, Washington, United States. It serves the city of Sedro-Woolley and the communities of Clear Lake, Hamilton, Lake Cavanaugh, Lyman, and almost all of Big Lake, in Skagit County..

In May 2021, the district had an enrollment of 4,479 students.

== Schools ==
=== Elementary schools ===
- Big Lake Elementary (K-6)
- Central Elementary (K-6)
- Clear Lake Elementary (K-6)
- Evergreen Elementary (K-6)
- Lyman Elementary (K-6)
- Mary Purcell Elementary (K-6)
- Samish Elementary (K-6)

=== Middle schools ===
- Cascade Middle School (7-8)

=== High schools ===
- State Street High School (9-12)
- Sedro-Woolley High School (9-12)

=== Alternative programs ===
- State Street High School
- Sedro-Woolley Special Programs (PK-11)
- Northwest Career and Technical Academy, a skills center operated jointly by several nearby school districts.

== Governance ==
The district is governed by a board of directors elected from geographical sub-districts. Each of the five directors is elected for a term of four years.

The superintendent is Miriam Mickelson, who has held the position since 2021. The previous superintendent, Phil Brockman, served from 2013 to 2021.
