= Sedro-Woolley High School =

Coordinates: 48°30′01″N 122°14′13″W

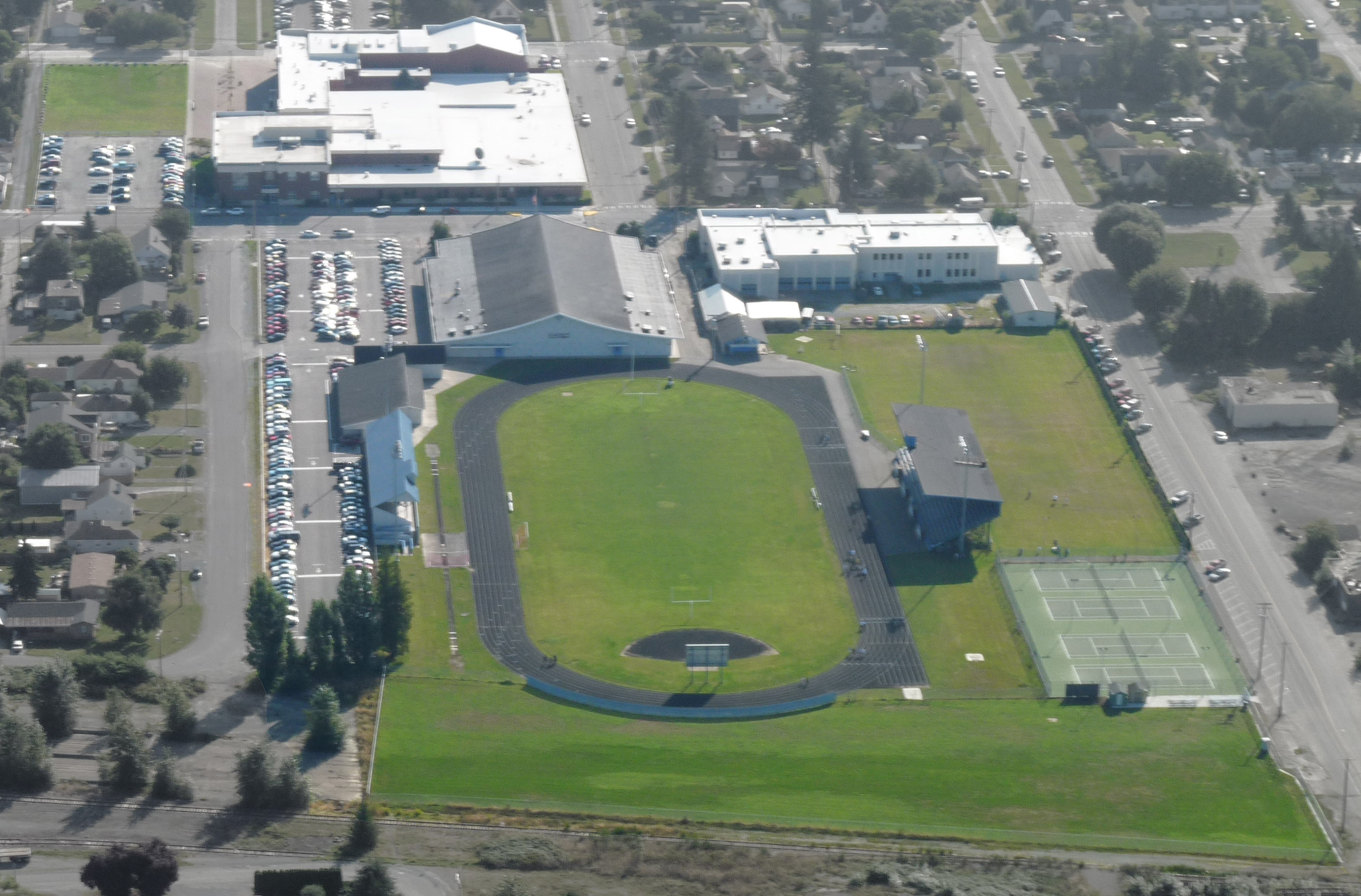
- Sedro-Woolley High School grounds

Location
- 1235 Third Street; Sedro-Woolley, Washington 98284

Information
- Type: Public secondary school
- Opened: 1911
- School district: Sedro-Woolley School District
- Principal: Kerri Carlton
- Teaching staff: 59.27 (FTE)
- Grades: 9-12
- Enrollment: 1,280 (2023-2024)
- Student to teacher ratio: 21.60
- Colors: Blue & White
- Nickname: Cubs
- Website: www.swsd.k12.wa.us/o/swhs

Sedro-Woolley High School is a public high school in the city of Sedro-Woolley, Washington State. The school enrolls about 1394 in grades 9-12. Its colors are blue and white and the school mascot is the bear cub. It is the primary high school for the Sedro-Woolley School District, with State Street High School being the alternative school.

== Academics ==
Sedro-Woolley High School has had a history of competitive academic success in multiple areas of study. In 1999 and 2000 the University of Washington's College of Oceanographic and Fishery Sciences sponsored a statewide science competition in conjunction with the National Oceanographic and Marine Sciences Championship conducted by the Consortium for Oceanographic Research and Education in Washington, DC. Both years Sedro-Woolley High School fielded the state championship Oceanographic Science Team beating out Seattle's Garfield High on each occasion. In 2000, their team composed of David Peterson, Jonathan Hough, Ty Bergstrom, and alternate Kim Lowe went on to complete at the national level and finish in a multi-team tie for 5th place, being one of the only public schools to finish.

== Athletics ==
Sedro-Woolley plays in the Northwest Conference as a size 3A school. A variety of sports are offered including football, soccer, wrestling, swimming, volleyball, basketball, tennis, golf, cross country, and track and field.
