= Sedron Technologies =

Waste management technology company

Sedron Technologies is a private, private equity backed, US-based company founded in 2014 that develops and deploys advanced technologies specializing in sustainable waste management and resource recovery. Founded as a spinoff of Janicki Industries by Peter and Susan Janicki, the firm develops systems to transform liquid waste streams – such as biosolids, manure, and other slurries – into fertilizers, biomass fuel, and reclaimed water. The company characterizes its mission as driving a circular economy in waste treatment, delivering carbon-negative commodities and reducing environmental footprints of municipal, agricultural, and industrial waste management.

== History ==
Sedron was established in 2014 as a spinoff from Janicki Industries, initially developing waste treatment technology (Janicki Omniprocessor) for the Bill & Melinda Gates Foundation to address global sanitation challenges related to human waste. The company was originally named Janicki Bioenergy but was renamed in 2018 to Sedron Technologies.

Although Sedron is headquartered in Sedro-Woolley, Washington, the company has expanded operations nationally, including facilities in Texas, Indiana, Wisconsin, and Florida.

== Technology ==
The company's flagship product is the Varcor system (Vapor ReCompression with Concentration & Recovery), which uses mechanical vapor recompression and thin-film drying to process biosolids, livestock manure, and wastewater into sterilized liquid and dry fertilizers, biomass fuel, and clean, reusable water.

This process captures ammonia directly from waste streams. In agriculture, this prevents methane emissions from manure decomposition in lagoons and reduces reliance on petrochemical-based fertilizers.

The system is energy-efficient, reducing electricity consumption by up to 95% compared to traditional methods, and produces outputs such as carbon-negative ammonia, phosphorus-rich dry solids, and certified Organic liquid Ammonium-Nitrate (when using dairy manure as the feedstock).

Sedron's facilities can handle large-scale operations, such as processing 250 million gallons of cow manure annually at a site in Indiana.

== Fundraising ==
On April 9th 2026 Axios published that Sedron had raised $500M from Private Equity firm Ara Partners, bringing their total funds raised up to $800M; Sedron had previously raised $100M in corporate equity and debt and $200M in project equity and debt. Previous investors included the founders and low carbon Private Equity firm Generate Capital.

On October 29th 2026, the National Law Review published that Sedron was awarded a $116.9M grant from the USDA under their Fertilizer Investment and Expansion for Long-Term Domestic Supply (FIELDS) Program to expand Sedron's domestic fertilizer production in Indiana and Kansas.

== Awards and recognition ==
In 2025, Sedron Technologies received Fast Company's World Changing Ideas Award for its Varcor system, recognizing its contributions to sustainability in waste management.

The award was given because technology addresses environmental issues, including reducing greenhouse gas emissions from dairy farms, which account for approximately 2% of total U.S. emissions.

In 2025 Sedron was also featured in Inc.com's annual Best in Business list under the Best Social Good category as "An upcycler of biowaste that scaled its technology to render fertilizers, ammonia, and clean water".

Sedron was also featured in the MIT Technology Review for its up-cycling technology that can be a meaningful new source of nutrients and help reduce waste-treatment burdens.
