= Philip Woolley =

Philip A. Woolley
- Born: February 17, 1831; Malone, New York
- Died: June 12, 1912 (aged 81); Sedro-Woolley, Washington
- Resting place: Union Cemetery, Sedro-Woolley, Washington
- Known for: namesake of city of Sedro-Woolley
- Spouse: Catherine Loucks

Philip Woolley (February 17, 1831 – June 12, 1912) was a Canadian American businessman for whom the city of Sedro-Woolley, Washington, is partly named.

== Early life and education ==
Philip Woolley was born in Malone, New York, to an American father and Canadian mother.

== Career ==
Woolley moved to Russell, Ontario in the 1850s, where he worked as a lumberjack and opened a general store. In 1867 he relocated his family to Michigan and, later, to Elgin, Illinois. Building on his experience as a lumberjack and salesman in Ontario, Woolley began selling timber for railroad crossties to the Chicago & Alton Railway.

In 1889 Woolley again moved, this time to Washington state, in hope of growing his railway contracting business by taking advantage of the expanding Northern Pacific Railroad, which had just established a terminus in Tacoma, Washington. Woolley settled in Sedro, Washington, in Skagit County, purchasing 84 acres of land just outside the town limits at a location where he felt the expanding rail lines would cross. Meanwhile, with his sons, he began constructing the Skagit River Lumber & Shingle Mill on his newly acquired property, growing his acreage into a company town named Woolley. In 1898, the two towns were merged as Sedro-Woolley.

Woolley continued to enjoy business success in later life, supplying material to the Seaboard Air Line Railroad and taking up part-time residence in Georgia to service his new client.

== Personal life ==
Woolley married Catherine Loucks of Ottawa on January 23, 1857. They had at least five children. Woolley died at his home on Woodworth Street in Sedro-Woolley in 1912.
