= Lake Cavanaugh, Washington =

- CDP
- Nicknames: Lake C, The Lake
- Location of Lake Cavanaugh, Washington
- Coordinates: 48°19′13″N 122°00′06″W
- Country: United States
- State: Washington
- County: Skagit

Area
  - Total: 2.1 sq mi (5.5 km^{2})
  - Land: 0.89 sq mi (2.3 km^{2})
  - Water: 1.3 sq mi (3.3 km^{2})
- Elevation: 1,014 ft (309 m)

Population (2020)
  - Total: 200
  - Density: 230/sq mi (87/km^{2})
- Time zone: UTC-8 (PST)
  - Summer (DST): UTC-7 (PDT)
- ZIP Code: 98274
- Area code(s): 360, 564
- FIPS code: 53-37105
- GNIS feature ID: 2408535
- Website: Lake Cavanaugh Community Web Page

Lake Cavanaugh is a census-designated place (CDP) in Skagit County, Washington, United States. The population was 200 at the 2020 census. It is included in the Mount Vernon–Anacortes, Washington Metropolitan Statistical Area.

Based on per capita income, Lake Cavanaugh ranks 30th of 522 areas in the state of Washington to be ranked. It is also the highest rank achieved in Skagit County.

== Geography ==
According to the United States Census Bureau, the CDP has a total area of 2.1 square miles (5.5 km^{2}), of which, 0.9 square miles (2.3 km^{2}) of it is land and 1.3 square miles (3.3 km^{2}) of it (59.15%) is water. Lake Cavanaugh has a maximum depth of 80 feet and a water volume of 36,000 acre ft. https://en.m.wikipedia.org/wiki/List_of_lakes_of_Washington

== Demographics ==
Historical population
Census	Pop.	Note	%±
2000	122		—
2010	167		36.9%
2020	200		19.8%
U.S. Decennial Census; 1970 1980 1990; 2000 2010

Lake Cavanaugh first appeared as a census designated place in the 2000 U.S. census.

=== Racial and ethnic composition ===
Lake Cavanaugh CDP, Washington – Racial and ethnic composition Note: the US Census treats Hispanic/Latino as an ethnic category. This table excludes Latinos from the racial categories and assigns them to a separate category. Hispanics/Latinos may be of any race.
Race / Ethnicity (NH = Non-Hispanic)	Pop 2000	Pop 2010	Pop 2020	% 2000	% 2010	% 2020
White alone (NH)	120	165	182	98.36%	98.80%	91.00%
Black or African American alone (NH)	0	0	0	0.00%	0.00%	0.00%
Native American or Alaska Native alone (NH)	0	1	0	0.00%	0.60%	0.00%
Asian alone (NH)	1	0	3	0.82%	0.00%	1.50%
Native Hawaiian or Pacific Islander alone (NH)	0	0	0	0.00%	0.00%	0.00%
Other race alone (NH)	0	0	1	0.00%	0.00%	0.50%
Mixed race or Multiracial (NH)	1	0	6	0.82%	0.00%	3.00%
Hispanic or Latino (any race)	0	1	8	0.00%	0.60%	4.00%
Total	122	167	200	100.00%	100.00%	100.00%

=== 2000 census ===
As of the census of 2000, there were 122 people, 58 households, and 41 families residing in the CDP. The population density was 140.3 people per square mile (54.1/km^{2}). There were 386 housing units at an average density of 443.8/sq mi (171.3/km^{2}). The racial makeup of the CDP was 98.36% White, 0.82% Asian, and 0.82% from two or more races.

There were 58 households, out of which 10.3% had children under the age of 18 living with them, 70.7% were married couples living together, and 27.6% were non-families. 25.9% of all households were made up of individuals, and 3.4% had someone living alone who was 65 years of age or older. The average household size was 2.10 and the average family size was 2.43.

In the CDP, the age distribution of the population shows 9.8% under the age of 18, 5.7% from 18 to 24, 11.5% from 25 to 44, 55.7% from 45 to 64, and 17.2% who were 65 years of age or older. The median age was 54 years. For every 100 females, there were 117.9 males. For every 100 females age 18 and over, there were 129.2 males.

The median income for a household in the CDP was $66,250, and the median income for a family was $95,012. Males had a median income of $35,096 versus $0 for females. The per capita income for the CDP was $32,195. None of the population or families were below the poverty line.

== Education ==
The community is served by the Sedro-Woolley School District.
