= Mechanical vapor recompression =

Heat recycling process

Mechanical vapor recompression (MVR) is an energy recovery process which recycles waste heat to improve efficiency. Typically, the compressed vapor is fed back to help heat the mother liquor in order to produce more vapor or steam.

== Applications ==
=== Current ===
Mechanical vapor recompression is used chiefly in industrial processes such as evaporation and distillation as well as in waste processing. Heat from the condenser, which would otherwise be lost, can be recovered and used in the evaporation process.

=== Past ===
MVR was successfully tested in a locomotive under the name of "The Anderson System". Testing found that it almost completely eliminated steam ejection, as well as greatly reduced operating noise. An Harold Holcroft, organiser of the tests wrote the following:

"In the ordinary way this would have created much noise and clouds of steam, but with the condensing set in action it was all absorbed with the ease with which snow would melt in a furnace! The engine was as silent as an electric locomotive and the only faint noises were due to slight pounding of the rods and a small blow at a piston gland. This had to be experienced to be believed; but for the regulator being wide open and the reverser well over, one would have imagined that the second engine (an LSWR T14 class that had been provided as a back-up) was propelling the first".

The trials continued until 1934 but various problems arose, mostly with the fan for forced draught, and the project went no further. The locomotive was converted back to standard form in 1935.

MVR was also used in the Cristiani compressed steam system for locomotive transmission. Although it was technically feasible, it failed to become popular because of its complexity.

== Benefits ==
The main benefit of MVR mechanical vapour recompression is that it allows for significant energy savings.

- Lower energy requirement
- Lower operating cost
- Very small capacity of Boiler or No Boiler
- No cooling water required
- Usually 1 or 2 effect which will simplify operation
- More than 97% of recovered Water can be recycled to process
- Smaller footprint
- Lower carbon footprint

== Alternatives ==
Alternatives to mechanical vapor recompression (MVR) are:

- Multiple effect evaporation (MEE)
- Thermal vapor recompression (TVR) (also known as thermocompression)

A combination of the three methods may be used depending on the process. For instance, a 3-effect evaporator circuit may be installed using MVR to transfer heat.
