= Tusko =

American circus elephant (died 1933)

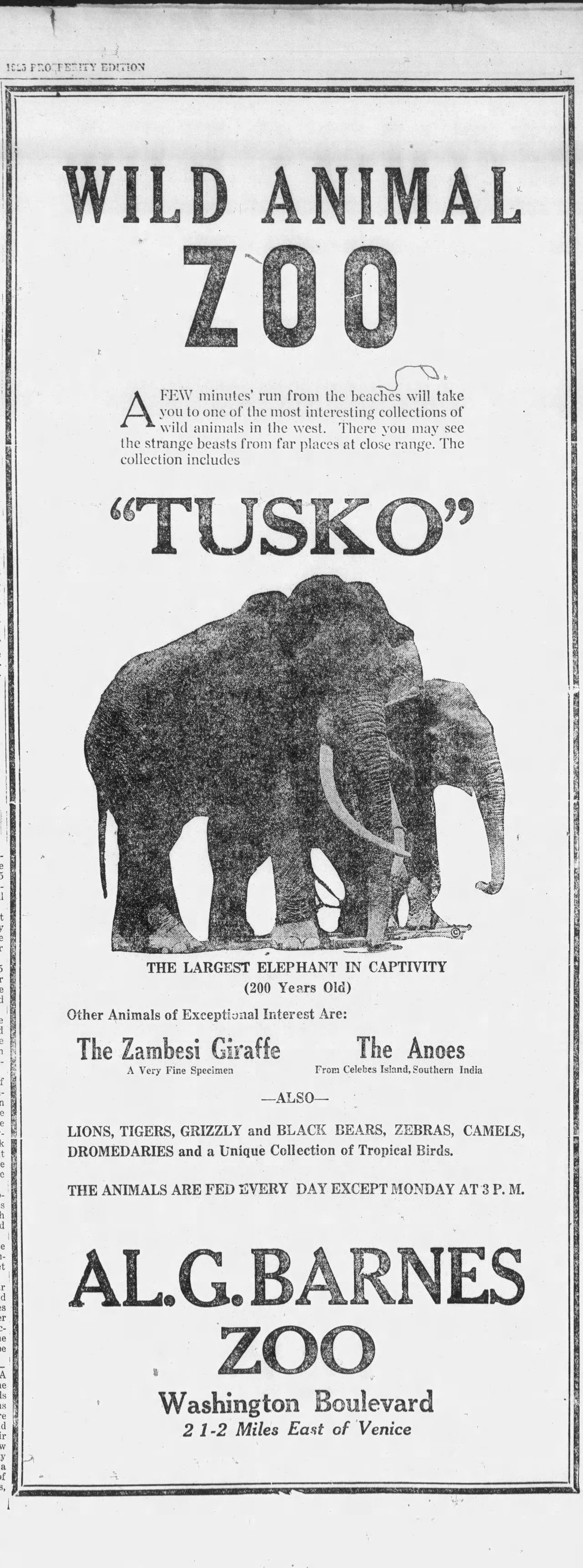
Tusko the elephant in a 1925 advertisement for Al G. Barnes Zoo in California—note Tusko's wildly exaggerated claimed age ("200 Years Old")

Tusko, formerly known as "Ned", was a giant circus elephant captured at age 6 in Siam (now Thailand). He stood just five feet high when he was unloaded from a sailing ship at New York Harbor in 1898.

Originally named Ned, he was part of several circuses in the 1900s, including the Great Syndicate Shows, the Great Eastern Shows, and the M.L. Clark & Sons Combined Shows. In 1921, he was purchased by the Al G. Barnes Circus and became its main attraction. He was renamed Tusko. The tusks which presumably earned him his name were about seven feet long (213 centimeters) at this time. By 1922, he was touted as "The Meanest Elephant" as well as "the largest elephant ever in captivity", though at 10-feet-2-inches tall (3.1 meters), he was seven inches shorter than Jumbo. Nonetheless, Tusko was a ton heavier than Jumbo and the largest elephant in North America since Jumbo. On May 14, 1922, Tusko escaped in Sedro-Woolley, Washington, and caused $20,000 in damage.

John Ringling bought the circus and sold Tusko to Al Painter, who worked for the Lotus Isle amusement park in Portland, Oregon, where he performed as "Tusko the Magnificent". The March 23, 1931, issue of The Oregonian Newspaper reported that an airplane crash at Lotus Isle spooked the animal, causing Tusko to go on a rampage. Painter sold the elephant to T. H. Eslick, one of Lotus Isle's developers. Eslick later abandoned him at the 1931 Oregon State Fair. By this time, his tusks had been reduced to nubbins.

Tusko changed hands repeatedly, until finally Seattle Mayor John F. Dore, taking pity on his poor condition, had him confiscated from his latest owner on October 8, 1932. Tusko ended his days in the Seattle Zoo, dying of a blood clot on June 10, 1933.

== See also ==
- List of individual elephants
- Tusko, an Indian elephant in Oklahoma who was subject to the world's largest LSD dose and subsequently killed.
