= Jim Youngsman =

American politician (1938–2025)

Member of the Washington House of Representatives from the 40th district
- In office 1989–1991
- Preceded by: Jim Fox
- Succeeded by: Rob Johnson

Personal details
- Born: James Ernest Youngsman; April 13, 1938 Sedro-Woolley, Washington, U.S.
- Died: July 18, 2025 (aged 87) Stanwood, Washington, U.S.
- Party: Republican
- Spouse: Ruth Lyon Matthews (m. 1962)
- Education: Washington State University; Pennsylvania State University

James Ernest Youngsman (April 13, 1938 – July 18, 2025) was an American politician. A member of the Republican Party, he served in the Washington House of Representatives from 1989 to 1991.

== Early life and career ==
Youngsman was born in Sedro-Woolley, Washington, the son of Adrian and Henrietta Youngsman. He attended and graduated from Washington State University. After graduating, he attended Pennsylvania State University, earning his master's degree in floriculture, which after earning his degree, he worked at Danbury State Correctional Facility in Danbury, Connecticut.

Youngsman served in the Washington House of Representatives from 1989 to 1991.

== Personal life and death ==
In 1962, Youngsman married Ruth Lyon Matthews. Their marriage lasted until Youngsman's death in 2025.

Youngsman died in Stanwood, Washington on July 18, 2025, at the age of 87.
