= Black Diamond (elephant) =

India-born American elephant put down after killing 4 people (1898–1929)

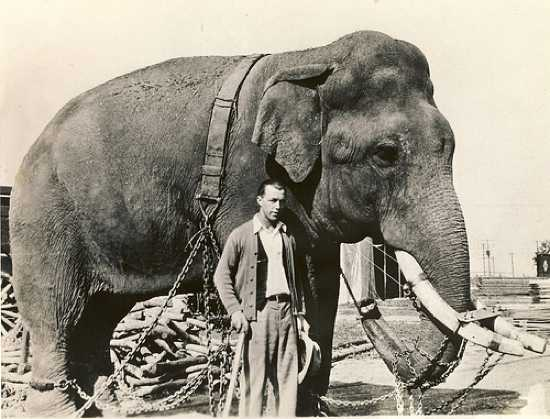
Black Diamond

Black Diamond (c. 1898–1929) was an Indian elephant owned by the Al G. Barnes Circus. It is considered one of the most notorious elephants in the world.

== Life and death ==
Weighing approximately 18,000 lb (8,200 kg), Black Diamond was believed to be the largest Indian elephant in captivity. He was imported from the Tierpark Hagenbeck (Hamburg, Germany) in 1900. A good worker but prone to fits of temper, he was generally kept chained to two calm female elephants during parades through the towns the circus visited. On October 12, 1929, while being unloaded in Corsicana, Texas, Black Diamond went on a rampage, injuring his long-time former trainer, Homer D. "Curley" Pritchett, and killing Pritchett's current employer, Eva Donohoo (née Mary Evelyn Speed, aged 51), a former Houston Post society editor, who had hired Pritchett away from the circus by offering him a job at her ranch, known as "Shoestring Plantation", near Kerens, Texas. Pritchett said he and his wife were tired of traveling. Pritchett accepted and left the Al Barnes Circus. Unfortunately, the conversation between Pritchett and Donohoo took place in front of Black Diamond, who was eating his hay. It is believed by many that the pachyderm was triggered by seeing Pritchett and Donohoo together.

Donohoo was the fourth person Black Diamond had killed, so after his recapture he was deemed too dangerous to continue with the circus and the decision was made to put him down. Numerous ideas were floated but his size made most of them unworkable. The initial plan was poison but Black Diamond refused all food. The final decision was to shoot him in Kenedy, Texas. "His handlers led him through town on a 'death march' before bringing him to a clearing, where before hundreds of spectators, he was felled by 'volley after volley' of machine-gun fire." Given the inexpertise of the shooters, between 50 and 100 shots were required before Black Diamond died.

== Aftermath ==
His mounted head, on display in a museum in Houston, Texas for many years, was eventually acquired by a local Corsicana businessman, Carmack Watkins (May 29, 1925 – November 23, 2018), who had been a four-year-old boy in the crowd that day in October 1929. Allegedly, one of his feet was made into a pedestal for a bust of Hans Nagle, Houston's first zookeeper, the man who fired the final shot that brought Black Diamond down. Another one of his legs is on display in the old post office in the ghost town of Helena, Texas.

In 1999, Curtis Eller's American Circus recorded "The Execution of Black Diamond", a retelling of the events of October 12, 1929.

== See also ==
- List of individual elephants
- Elephant execution in the United States
