= Clear Lake, Skagit County, Washington =

- CDP
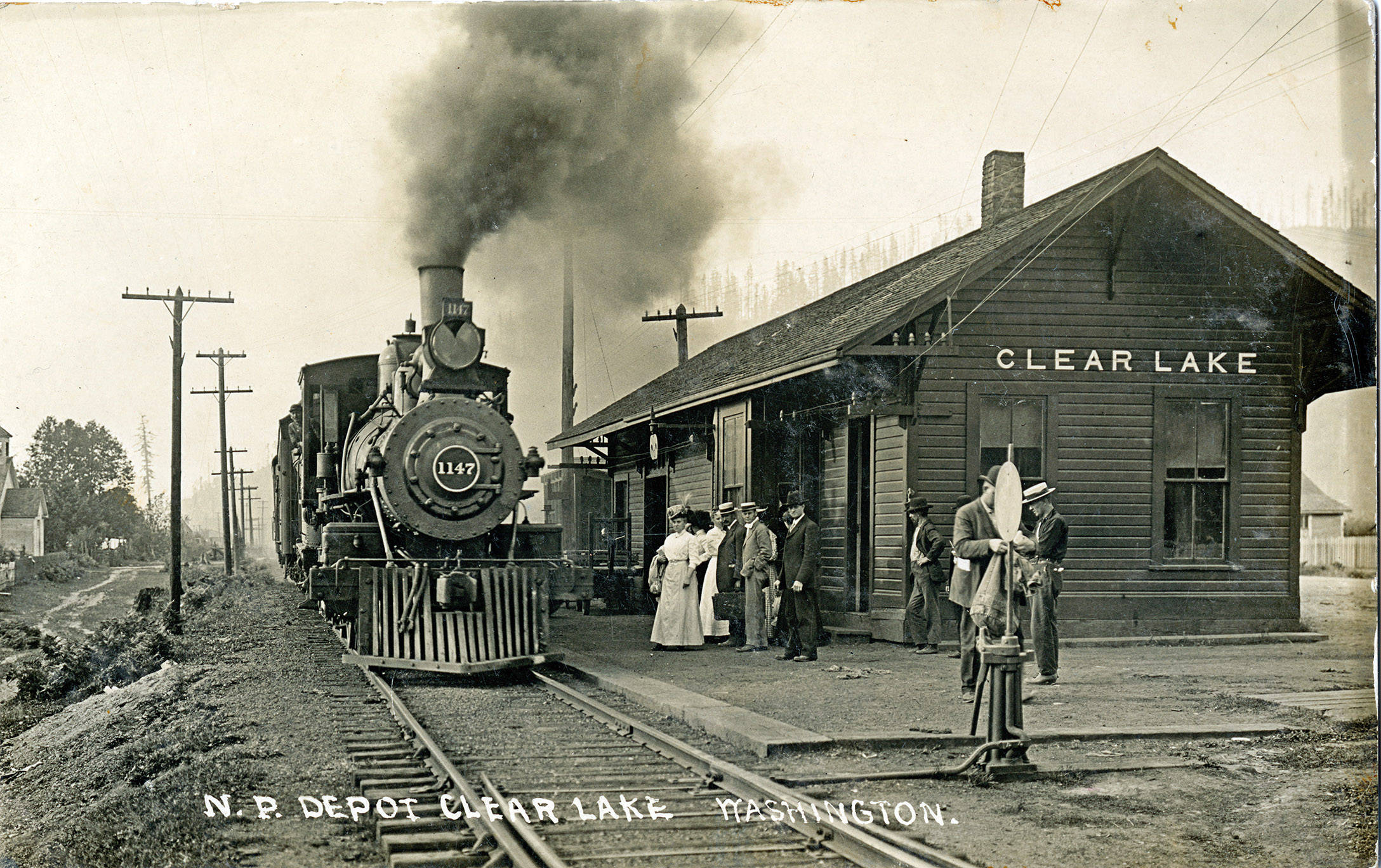

- Location of Clear Lake, Washington
- Coordinates: 48°27′51″N 122°14′03″W
- Country: United States
- State: Washington
- County: Skagit

Area
  - Total: 2.242 sq mi (5.806 km^{2})
  - Land: 1.898 sq mi (4.915 km^{2})
  - Water: 0.344 sq mi (0.891 km^{2})
- Elevation: 46 ft (14 m)

Population (2020)
  - Total: 1,228
  - Density: 647.1/sq mi (249.8/km^{2})
- Time zone: UTC-8 (Pacific (PST))
  - Summer (DST): UTC-7 (PDT)
- ZIP Code: 98235
- Area code: 360, 564
- FIPS code: 53-12840
- GNIS feature ID: 1512096

Clear Lake is a census-designated place (CDP) in Skagit County, Washington, United States. The population was 1,228 at the 2020 census. It is included in the Mount Vernon–Anacortes, Washington Metropolitan Statistical Area.

== History ==
=== Native history ===
One large cedar plank house called sq̓əxʷšəd was home to several families of the dəqʷə́čabʔs band of Upper Skagit during the 1880s a smallpox epidemic wiped out most of the villages on the south side of the Skagit river including those living in sq̓əxʷšəd.

==== Modern history ====
Clear Lake was platted in 1890 when the railroad was extended to that point. A post office called Clearlake has been in operation since 1891. A museum is located in the former Odd Fellows Hall on State Route 9 in Clear Lake.

== Geography ==
According to the United States Census Bureau, the CDP has a total area of 2.2 square miles (5.8 km^{2}), of which, 1.9 square miles (4.9 km^{2}) of it is land and 0.3 square miles (0.8 km^{2}) of it (14.29%) is water. It is situated between two lakes, Mud Lake, and Clear Lake.

=== Climate ===
The climate in this area has mild differences between highs and lows, and there is adequate rainfall year-round. According to the Köppen Climate Classification system, Clear Lake has a marine west coast climate, abbreviated "Cfb" on climate maps.

== Demographics ==
Historical population
Census	Pop.	Note	%±
2000	942		—
2010	1,002		6.4%
2020	1,228		22.6%
U.S. Decennial Census; 1970 1980 1990; 2000 2010

Clear Lake first appeared as a census designated place in the 2000 U.S. census.

=== Racial and ethnic composition ===
Clear Lake CDP, Skagit County, Washington – Racial and ethnic composition Note: the US Census treats Hispanic/Latino as an ethnic category. This table excludes Latinos from the racial categories and assigns them to a separate category. Hispanics/Latinos may be of any race.
Race / Ethnicity (NH = Non-Hispanic)	Pop 2000	Pop 2010	Pop 2020	% 2000	% 2010	% 2020
White alone (NH)	889	886	983	94.37%	88.42%	80.05%
Black or African American alone (NH)	1	7	7	0.11%	0.70%	0.57%
Native American or Alaska Native alone (NH)	15	6	13	1.59%	0.60%	1.06%
Asian alone (NH)	5	3	8	0.53%	0.30%	0.65%
Native Hawaiian or Pacific Islander alone (NH)	0	0	2	0.00%	0.00%	0.16%
Other race alone (NH)	1	0	9	0.11%	0.00%	0.73%
Mixed race or Multiracial (NH)	16	33	78	1.70%	3.29%	6.35%
Hispanic or Latino (any race)	15	67	128	1.59%	6.69%	10.42%
Total	942	1,002	1,228	100.00%	100.00%	100.00%

=== 2000 census ===
As of the census of 2000, there were 942 people, 371 households, and 258 families residing in the CDP. The population density was 492.3 people per square mile (190.4/km^{2}). There were 392 housing units at an average density of 204.9/sq mi (79.2/km^{2}). The racial makeup of the CDP was 95.12% White, 0.11% African American, 1.59% Native American, 0.53% Asian, 0.85% from other races, and 1.80% from two or more races. Hispanic or Latino of any race were 1.59% of the population.

There were 371 households, out of which 30.2% had children under the age of 18 living with them, 54.4% were married couples living together, 10.0% had a female householder with no husband present, and 30.2% were non-families. 19.1% of all households were made up of individuals, and 4.6% had someone living alone who was 65 years of age or older. The average household size was 2.54 and the average family size was 2.94.

In the CDP, the age distribution of the population shows 23.0% under the age of 18, 8.7% from 18 to 24, 28.6% from 25 to 44, 26.8% from 45 to 64, and 13.0% who were 65 years of age or older. The median age was 38 years. For every 100 females, there were 102.6 males. For every 100 females age 18 and over, there were 104.2 males.

The median income for a household in the CDP was $37,143, and the median income for a family was $44,167. Males had a median income of $37,500 versus $30,865 for females. The per capita income for the CDP was $22,223. About 16.7% of families and 15.9% of the population were below the poverty line, including 15.8% of those under age 18 and 20.7% of those age 65 or over.

== Education ==
The community is served by the Sedro-Woolley School District.
