= Alpheus George Barnes Stonehouse =

Canadian circus owner (1862–1931)

Al G. Barnes
- Born: Alpheus George Barnes Stonehouse Sr. September 1, 1862; Lobo, Canada West
- Died: July 25, 1931 (aged 68); Indio, California, US
- Known for: Al G. Barnes Circus
- Spouses: Dollie Arminta Barlow; Sarah Jane Hartigan; Margaret Goldsboro
- Children: Alpheus G.B. Stonehouse, Jr. (1920-1989) Rosemary Canadia Stonehouse (1918-1993) Virginia Lee Stonehouse (1916-2011)
- Relatives: Lydia Stonehouse Bishop, sister

Alpheus George Barnes Stonehouse Sr. (September 1, 1862 – July 25, 1931), best known as Al G. Barnes was the owner of the Al G. Barnes Circus.

== Biography ==
Barnes was born on September 1, 1862, in Lobo, Canada West, to Thomas S. Stonehouse (1826-1882) and Sarah Barnes (1825-1883). He then married Dollie Arminta Barlow and she filed for divorce in 1916.

Babe Eckhart started what she believed was a relationship with him. She played the calliope in his circus. When he refused to marry her, she shot herself just outside his private railroad car in Idaho in 1919.

In 1922 his divorce from Dollie Arminta was granted. He then married Sarah Jane Hartigan and they had three children before they divorced. He lastly married Margaret Goldsboro.

In January 1929, he sold his circus to the American Circus Corporation.

He died on July 25, 1931, in Indio, California. He had been ill for most of the past year with pneumonia.
