= Al G. Barnes Circus =

Early 20th century traveling show

Origin
- Country: United States
- Founder(s): Alpheus George Barnes Stonehouse
- Year founded: 1895

Information
- Fate: Purchased by the American Circus Corporation in 1929. Stopped touring after 1938.

Al G. Barnes Circus was an American circus run by Alpheus George Barnes Stonehouse that operated from 1898 to 1938.

== History ==
Stonehouse started his show in 1895 with a pony, a phonograph, and a stereopticon. By 1929, the "Al G. Barnes Wild Animal Show" had grown to five rings and it was purchased by the American Circus Corporation. American Circus already owned the Sells-Floto Circus, John Robinson Shows, Hagenbeck-Wallace Circus, and Sparks Circus. That same year John Ringling, the owner of the Ringling Bros. and Barnum & Bailey Circus, bought out the American Circus Corporation.

The five circuses that were part of that acquisition continued to tour under their own names, but were closed one-by-one during the Great Depression. In 1937, the Al G. Barnes Wild Animal Show and Sells Floto were combined into one circus. That circus, Al G. Barnes Sells-Floto toured in 1937 and 1938.

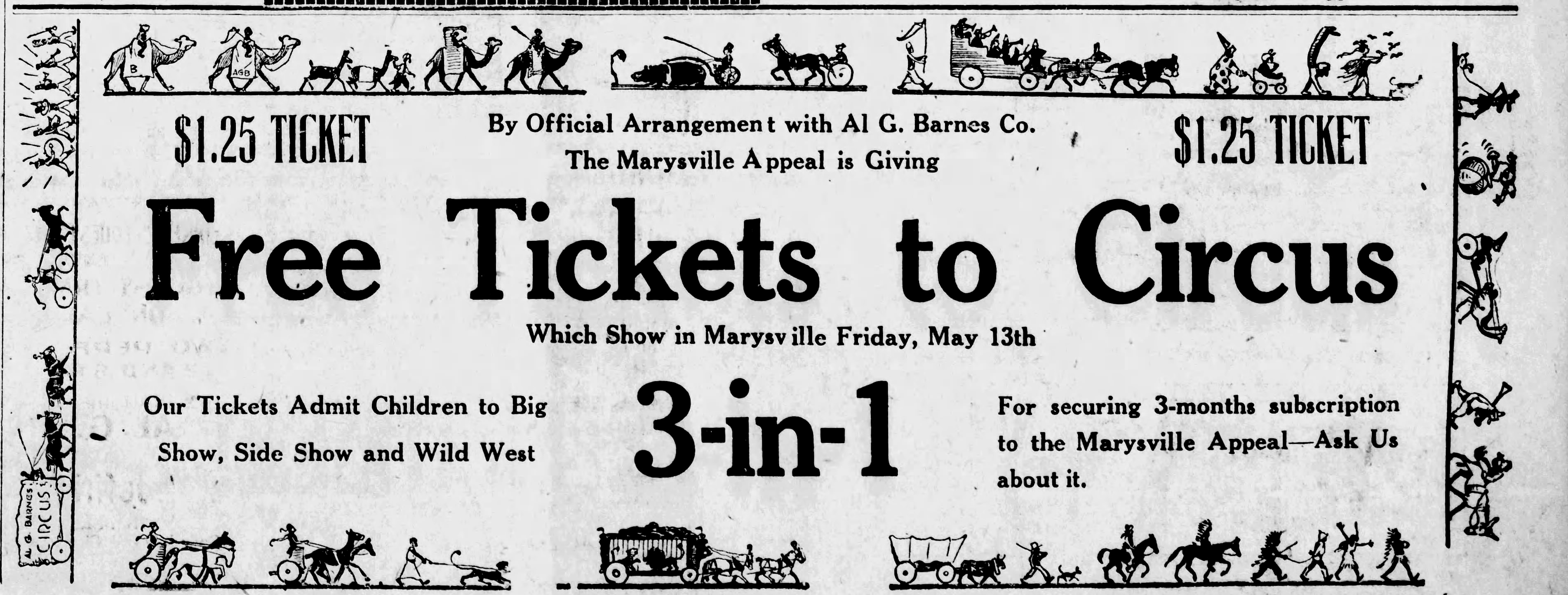
Barnes circus ticket printed in newspaper with runner art depicting parade

In 1938, the co-owned Ringling Bros and Barnum & Bailey Combined Shows was experiencing labor problems which ultimately led to the circus being closed after performances in Scranton, Pennsylvania on June 22. After regrouping at the circus winter quarters in Sarasota, Florida the Ringling-Barnum circus trains were dispatched to Redfield, South Dakota where the two circuses met and were combined into a yet larger circus featuring many of the major stars from Ringling-Barnum. The circus toured from July 11 until November 27, 1938, as "Al G. Barnes and Sells-Floto Circus Presenting Ringling Bros. and Barnum & Bailey Stupendous New Features. Among the attractions that were featured were big game hunter "Bring 'em Back Alive Frank Buck" and the gorilla Gargantua. When the show finished its season however, rather than returning to its own winter quarters in Baldwin Park, California, the circus trains traveled to the Ringling winter quarters near Sarasota, Florida, never to emerge again.

Animal trafficker and media personality Frank Buck claimed to have “provided Barnes with the bulk of his collection.”

== Notable performers ==
Although the Al G. Barnes Circus featured many traditional acts associated with circuses, it was known for its wild animal acts. Mabel Stark, the tiger trainer was associated with the circus for many years. Stark joined the circus in 1911, first presenting a horse act. In 1916, she began presenting tigers in the center ring of the wild animal show. Although she left the circus in 1922, she returned in 1930. Bert Nelson was another wild animal trainer who appeared on the circus in the late 1930s. For many seasons, the elephants were trained and presented by Frank "Cheerful" Gardner. Eddie Woenecker became the circus' bandmaster in 1913 and stayed with the circus through 1922. He returned to the circus in 1936 and continued to perform in that capacity through the 1938 season. Louis Roth was a noted lion tamer with the circus.

== Ethnic exhibits ==
Per Barnes' memoirs, Al G. Barnes Circus included "circus Indians," said to be Flathead and Sioux. In 1924 an advance article stated that "three tribes of Indians, Washoe, Escondido, and Apache," were traveling with the circus. In the circus's 1926 route book, the cast listing for "big show performers" has three categories: ladies, gentlemen, and Indian tribes.

Nabor Feliz, a Puebloan artist, sold his creations as part of the Barnes sideshow.

George and Willie Muse were two albino African-Americans who were exhibited as the "sheep-headed boys" and called Eko and Iko. They played mandolin and guitar. The lives of the Muse brothers are the subject of the book Truevine by Beth Macy.

Barnes imported a dozen Igorot people from the Philippines because they ate dog; "We could buy stray dogs from the pounds of various cities and give them a humane death ... their exhibition created a greater sensation than I had imagined."

== Sideshow "freaks" ==
- Per Barnes' memoir: "A woman with two bodies, both perfectly formed from the shoulders down. We found her in the backwoods of Texas where she was living on a ranch with her husband and three children. Two of her children were born from one side and one from the other. She traveled with the show for several years…after the show she permitted [curious women] to examine her." Her husband worked as a ticket taker. After experiencing health issues she reportedly returned to Texas where she died.
- Klinkhart's Talented Midgets, managed by Oscar Klinkhart
- High Bill, giant
- Liu Yu Ching, giant
- Clifford Thompson, giant. Cliff was with the circus in 1931.

== Animals ==
- One of their more famous animals was Black Diamond, an Indian elephant whose unpredictable temper resulted in the deaths of several people and was shot between 50 and 100 times in 1929, before his own death.
- Lotus the Hippopotamus was a perennial attraction; she was sometimes harnessed to a cart for parades.
- Photo illustration 344 of Barnes' memoir appears to show three trained polar bears in addition to performing lions and dogs.

== Barnes Zoo ==
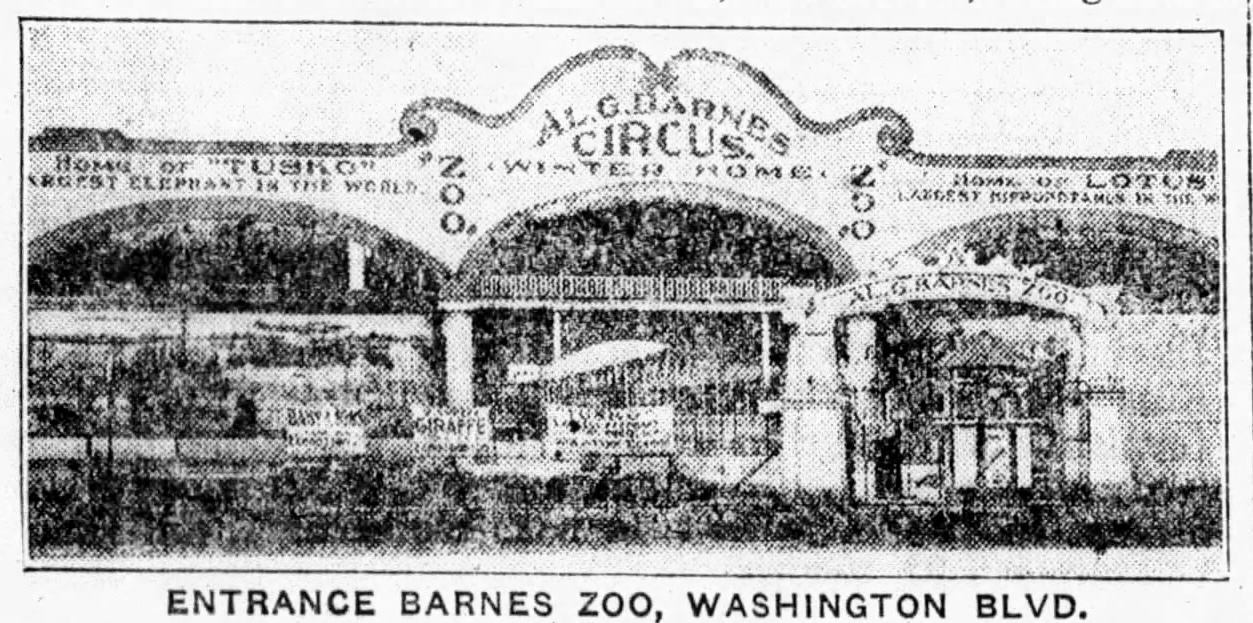
Barnes Zoo, 1925

The Al G. Barnes Circus was known as a "Wild Animal Show," and in December 1923 the Barnes Circus Zoo opened at the corner of Washington Boulevard and McLaughlin Avenue in Culver City.

The zoo cost $79,000 to build and at the time was kept open even when the show was touring.

At that time, the zoo had a lion, a leopard, jaguars, pumas, wolves, coyotes, 20 Bengal tigers (including eight new" ones said to be "cubs" unused to human interaction—their trainer described them as "cute little rascals"), a hippopotamus, Tusko the elephant who and was claimed to be "ten tons" or 20,000 lb (9,100 kg), another elephant named Ruth, a herd of Bactrian camels, a herd of at least eight zebras, llamas, alpacas, peccaries, elks, polar bears, seals, a boxing kangaroo named Fitz, a chimpanzee named Joe Martin, actuallyJoe Martin (orangutan), a “monkey” named Jiggs who appears in an accompanying photo to be a juvenile orangutan and is elsewhere called a “jungle man”, and “horses of every breed” including 12 Arabians and one called Billy. The live bird collection included American eagles, “black swans from Africa,” ostriches, storks, white peacocks, sauris cranes, pheasants, guinea hens, cockatoos and pigeons.

== Winter quarters ==
=== Venice ===
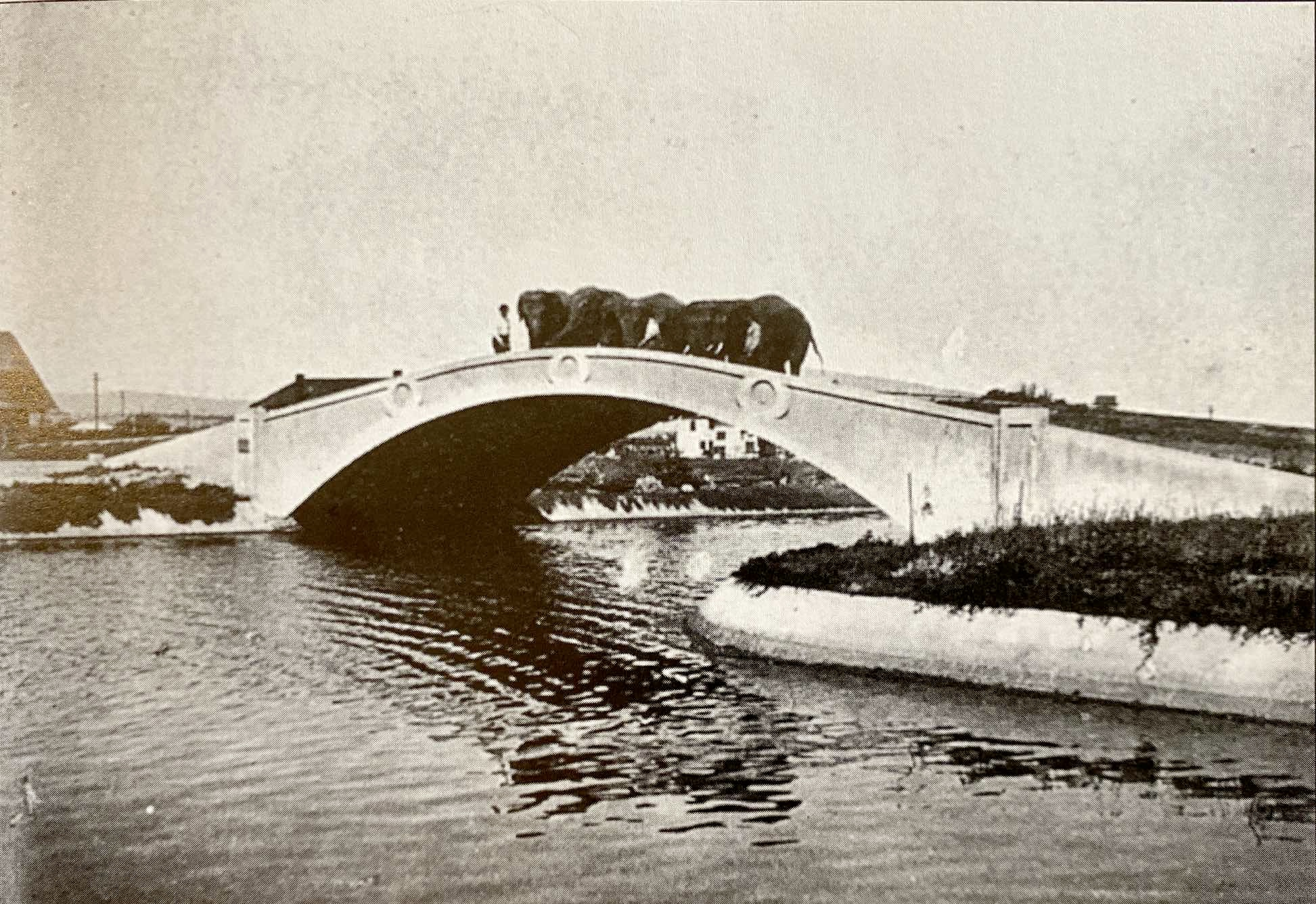
Circus elephants on one of the Venice canal bridges, from either the Sells-Floto or Barnes Circus

Barnes once told the Venice Vanguard newspaper that Abbot Kinney first brought him to Venice in 1910. At that time the Barnes team was composed of 506 humans and 600 animals. The Barnes Circus wintered in Venice every year but one between 1911 and 1919. Having observed that the Sells Floto Circus wintering in Venice increased visitor traffic, Pacific Electric Railway Company built Barnes a building for the animals, located between the Venice Lagoon and Abbot Kinney's pier. According to Barnes, PE built "the necessary barns and animal pens" and furnished water, light and "extra equipment." The circus was able to earn additional revenue and keep the animals in practice with weekend and holiday shows for tourists visiting the amusements. In 1911, their site was described as "just east of Trolleyway and south of Windward Avenue."

As Barnes told it in 1927:

He supplied the paper and when we were putting up billboard paper in the various towns advertising the circus attractions, we also used to put up potters advertising the advantages of living in California...With the same idea in view named all our cars that traveled through the country after towns in California, such as Venice, Los Angeles, Santa Monica and so forth, all with a view of keeping the names of California towns before the public. It was effective advertising. I also instructed all employees of the circus, about 1,000 of them, to tell people about the wonders of California. I believe we were responsible for bringing thousands here.

=== Barnes City ===
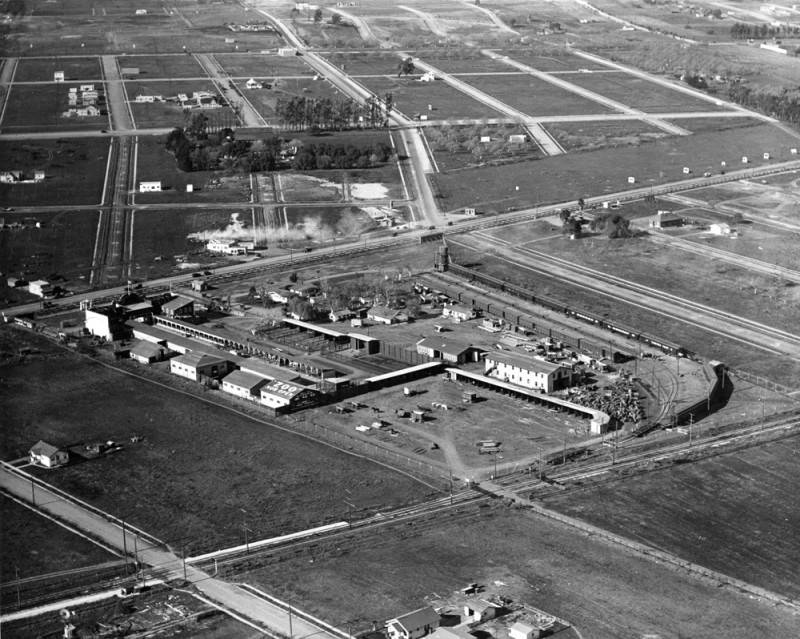
"Barnes City" c. 1924; note the rail cars on the right using a spur of the Redondo Beach via Playa del Rey Line

Barnes wintered at Venice until November 1920 when the circus trains returned for the winter to a new location on Washington Boulevard between Venice and Culver City, California, the former Sbacha Ranch. He stated, "I bought the site on Washington boulevard when there were only a few houses between Venice and downtown Los Angeles." Barnes named the area where the winter quarters and zoo were located Barnes City, California.

The Los Angeles Times profiled and photographed the Barnes City menagerie several times between 1925 and 1927, reporting that it was a 120-acre (490,000 m^{2}) site that contained over 4,000 animals, with a staff of more than 1180, 750 of who were performers in some 200 acts. (In a later report from late 1927 Barnes claims 83 acres, “the largest unplatted section” of Los Angeles.)

The writer of the 1926 report described “all-steel box cars, pullmans, and flat cars ready for the day the circus goes out"; the circus used the neighboring Redondo Beach via Playa Del Rey tracks to move in and out of the area.

==== Attempted municipal incorporation ====
The effort to incorporate Barnes City as an independent municipality within Los Angeles County, California has been described as "extremely confusing." As one history puts it, "Barnes City was never a community. It was instead a legal device to protect a circus and zoo from attempts to regulate its activities. It lasted as an incorporated entity for less than a year."

Barnes voted for incorporation in February 1926 but faced community resistance. Another account states, "At the time of the vote, there were 692 voters in Barnes City, 254 of the voters were employed by the circus. It is said that Al Barnes changed his entire circus schedule on election day so that the monkeys could vote without leaving their cages. Dissatisfied homeowners demanded a new election, but the Board of Directors, hand picked by Al Barnes, refused. The citizens took their case to the California Superior Court. They then circulated a petition seeking annexation to Los Angeles." Moreover, residents of Walnut Grove, the so-called “shoestring strip” along Washington Blvd., had voted to be annexed to Culver City in hopes of obtaining bus service to and from their neighborhood; this community's union with Culver City cut in half the proposed area of Barnes City. In September 1926, the population voted for annexation to the city of Los Angeles. At the time of the Los Angeles annexation vote in September 1926, the "circus city" was said to be 4.5 mi^{2} (12 km^{2}) in area and have a population of approximately 2500 people, although that may have been a bold overestimate. Per a neighborhood historian, "Unlike Mar Vista and Venice, which joined Los Angeles for water and other services, the homeowners of Barnes City sought freedom from living in a city built around a circus, run by the circus owner, whose brother was the mayor."

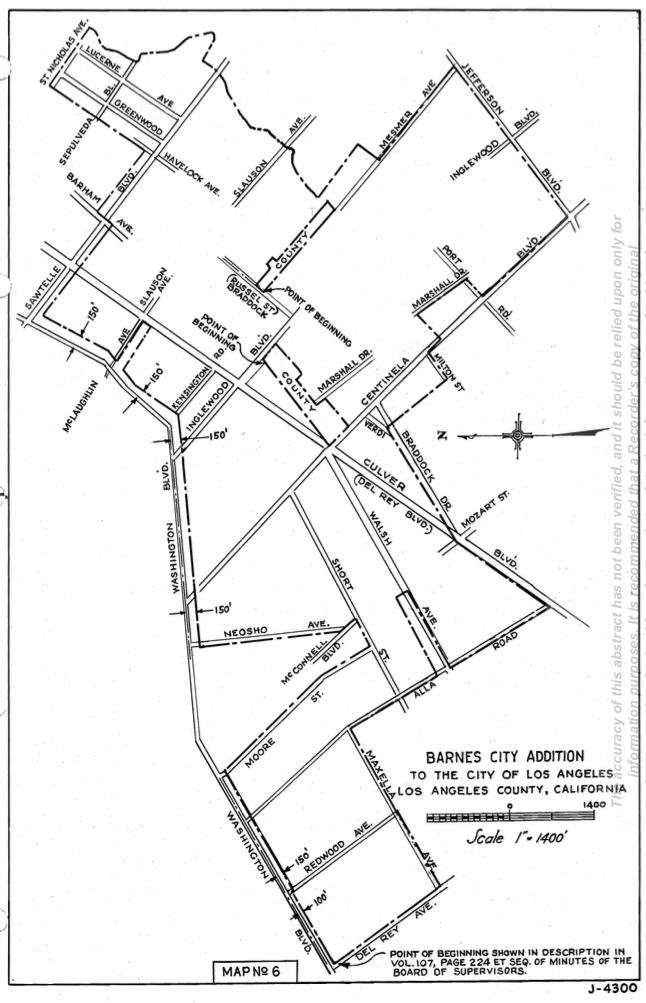
Barnes City addition to the city of Los Angeles

Circa 1927, Barnes City was still considered a tourist landmark along Washington Boulevard, considered equivalent in interest to Culver City, Cecil B. DeMille Studios, and Hal Roach Studios. In February 1927, Barnes announced plans to move the circus' winter quarters to Baldwin Park, saying he wanted to sell and subdivide the land along Washington Blvd. because "it is pretty well built up around here now". On or around August 8, 1927, a Superior Court judge undid all the attempts at incorporation and returned any unannexed land to the pool of unincorporated Los Angeles County land; no objection was filed on behalf of the erstwhile City, and that was the end of that. In October a second judge undid the assignment to the county. Regardless, Barnes City had ceased to exist as an attempted municipality. According to one account, "In April 1927, Barnes City became the 72nd Los Angeles annexation, adding 1160 acres. The location of Al Barnes Circus and Zoo, though, became part of Culver City." The parts annexed to Los Angeles became today's Del Rey, Los Angeles. Barnes City was still recorded as a placename on a Thomas Brothers map likely produced in 1936.

=== Baldwin Park ===
Following the annexation of the winter quarters property, Barnes relocated his winter quarters into an unincorporated area in the San Gabriel Valley in 1927. The 300 acres (120 ha) were on Valley Boulevard midway between Baldwin Park and El Monte. From 1927 until 1938 the circus returned to the Baldwin Park quarters, however at two separate locations. At the conclusion of the 1932 season the show unloaded about a half mile east of the original location and that is where it remained until 1938 when most of the equipment was transferred to the Ringling winter quarters in Sarasota, Florida at the end of the season.

== Notable events ==
The Barnes Circus train partially derailed at Motordrome in 1914, injuring four.

On May 15, 1922, a large circus elephant known as Tusko escaped from the Al G. Barnes Circus while it was in Sedro-Woolley, Washington. The elephant demolished fences, knocked over laundry lines and trees, telephone poles, and overturned a Model T.

On July 20, 1930, the circus suffered a train wreck in the small community of Canaan Station, New Brunswick, Canada. Three passengers were killed and 17 others were taken to hospital, where one later died of his injuries.

Sometime between 1924 and 1927, a train car holding 26 horses burned near Chico, California, killing all the animals.

== Films ==
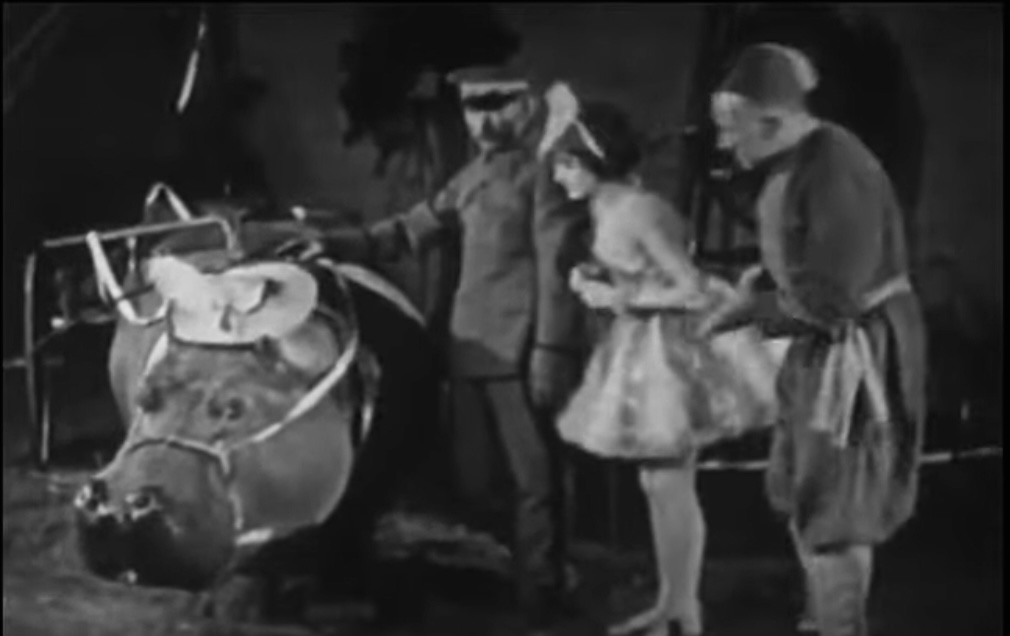
Spangles (1926)

Barnes threw a "jungle dinner" in honor of the Warner Brothers serial In the Shadows of the Jungle. The 1922 film used some 1500 Barnes animals as well as many human performers.

Spangles (1926) used a number of Barnes performers and animals.

Several Barnes performers appeared as café entertainers in Their Purple Moment, a 1927 silent comedy starring Stan Laurel and Oliver Hardy.

King of the Jungle is a 1933 Paramount Pictures film that includes animals, performers and scenes from the Al G. Barnes Circus and winter quarters in 1932. Although the movie is set on the lot of "Corey's Circus," it was actually filmed on location at the first Baldwin Park winter quarters. Several acts from the circus that season are featured, including Mabel Stark's tiger act. The tigers are mid-performance at the time that the big top catches fire during the film's climactic moments.

Charlie Chan at the Circus, a 1936 film uses Barnes equipment and animals. According to HR news items and production charts, June Lang and John Dilson were to be in the cast, but their participation in the final film has not been confirmed. According to a HR news item, the film was shot "on location at the Al G. Barnes winter quarters," and a MPH pre-release article states that "the Barnes Circus [was] used as a background for production settings."

source AFI

== Gallery ==
Additional images of Barnes circus and menagerie
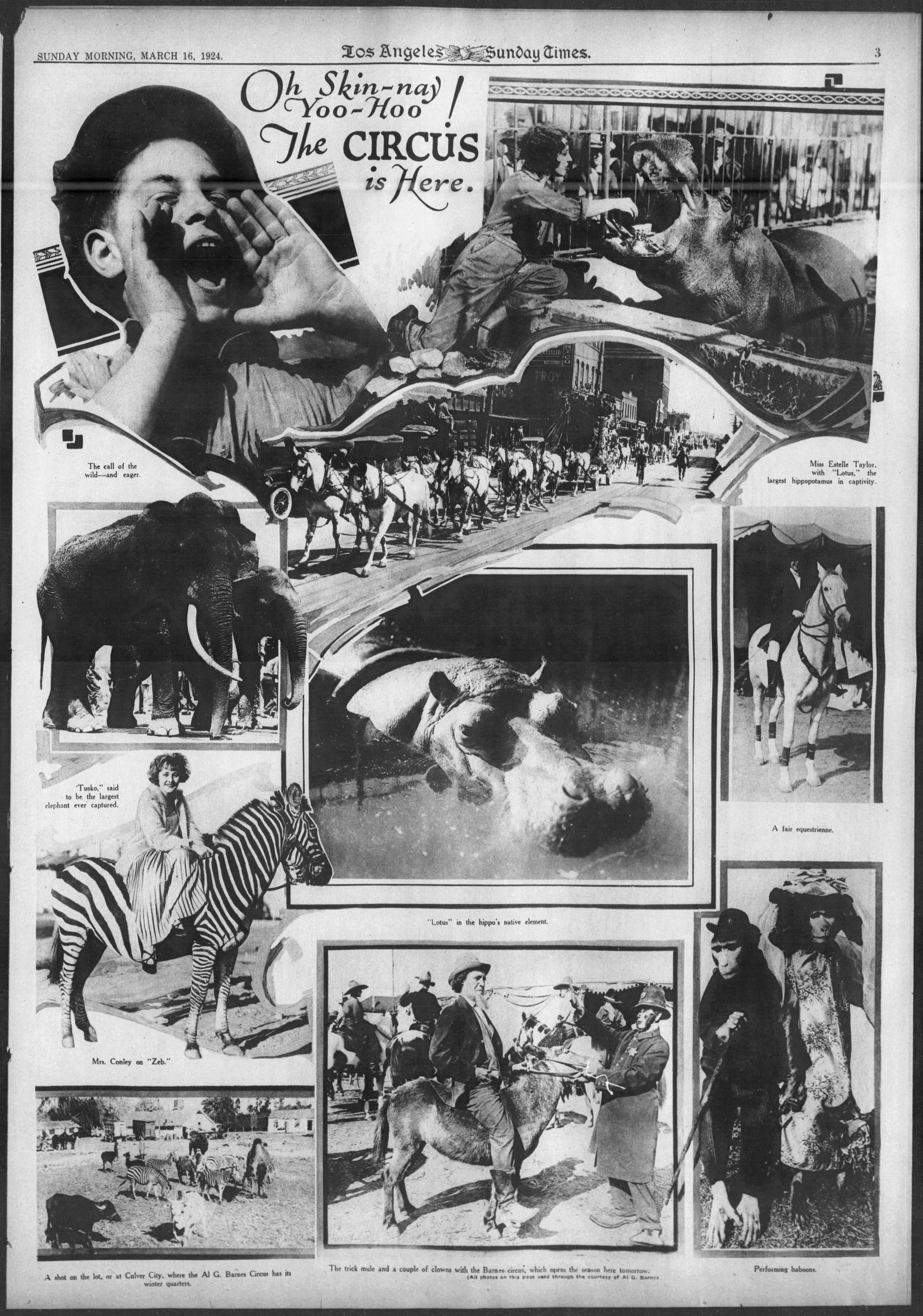
Los Angeles Times photo feature 1924

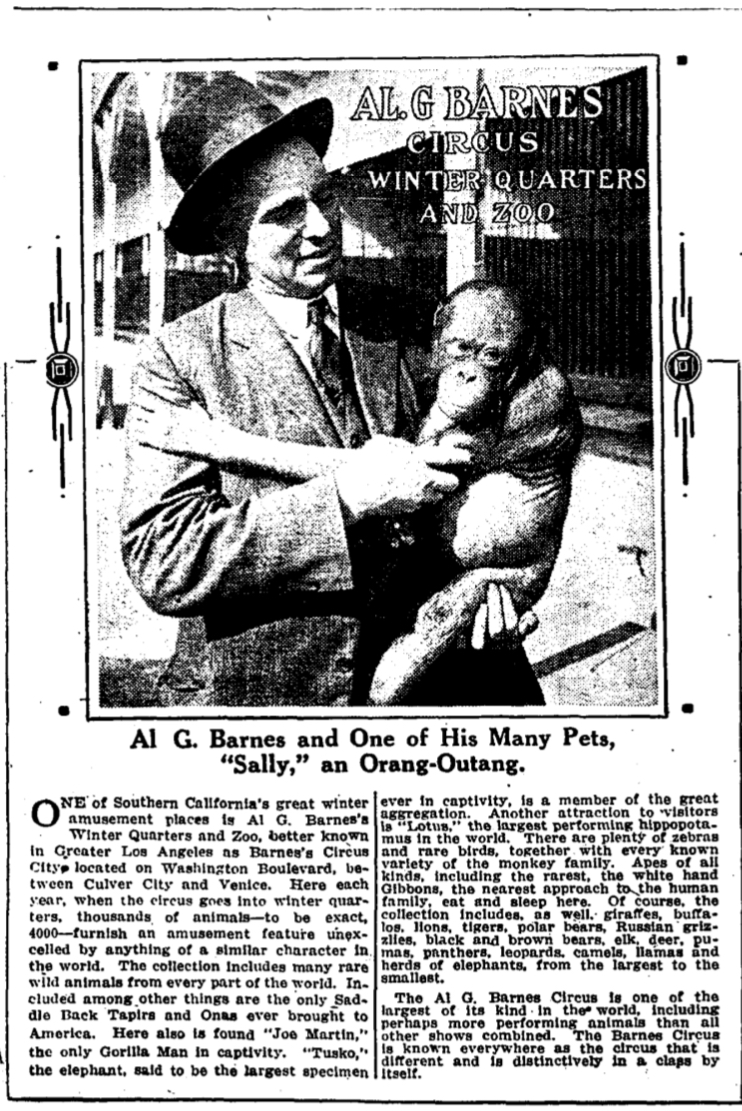
Barnes Zoo ad 1925

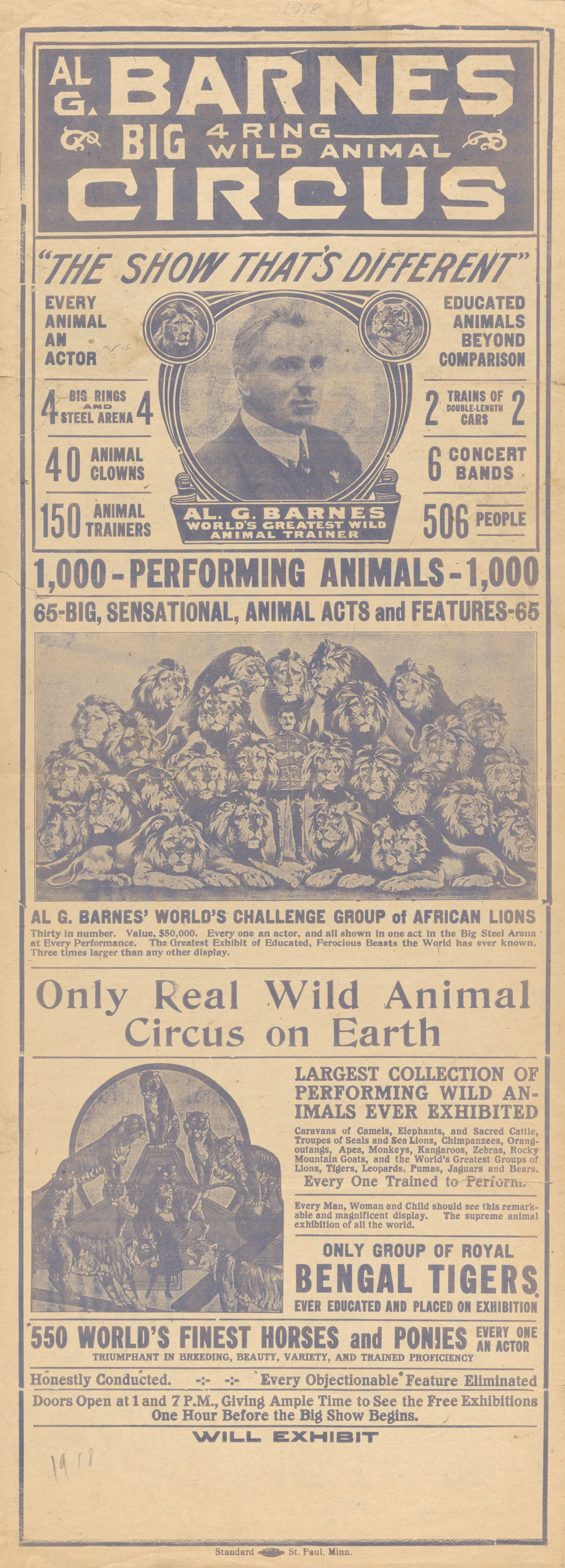
Advertisement 1918

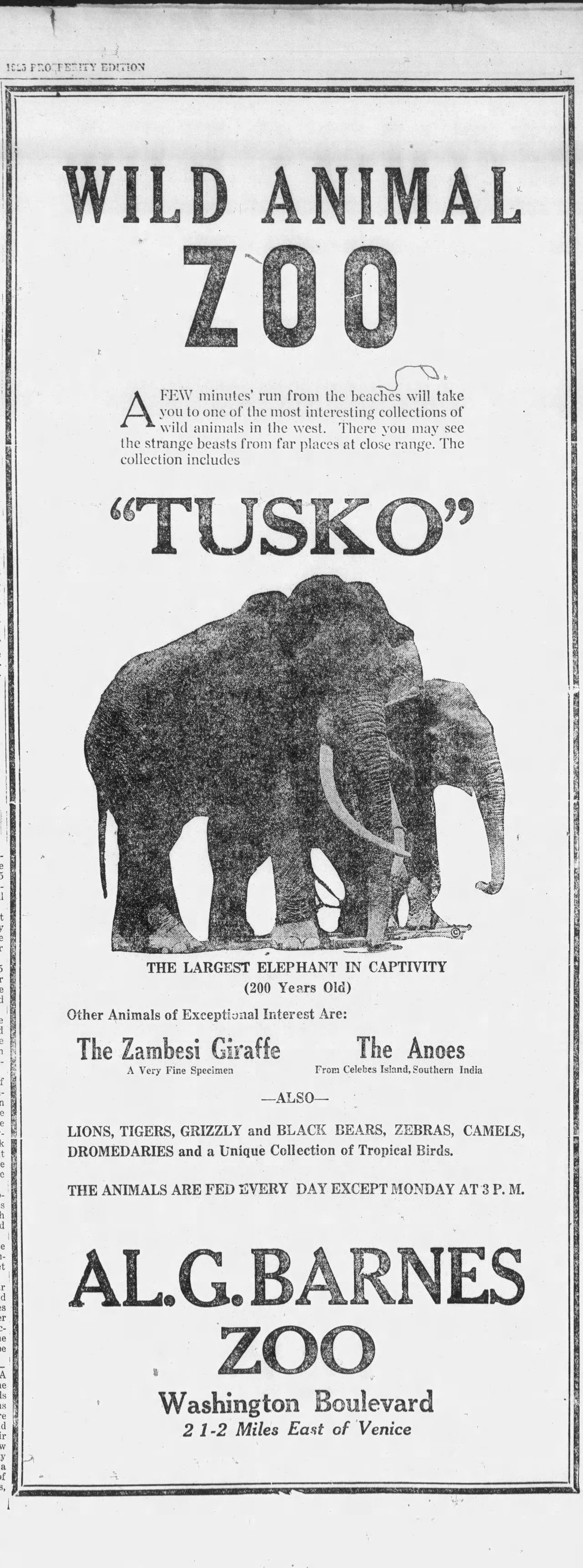
Tusko the elephant 1925

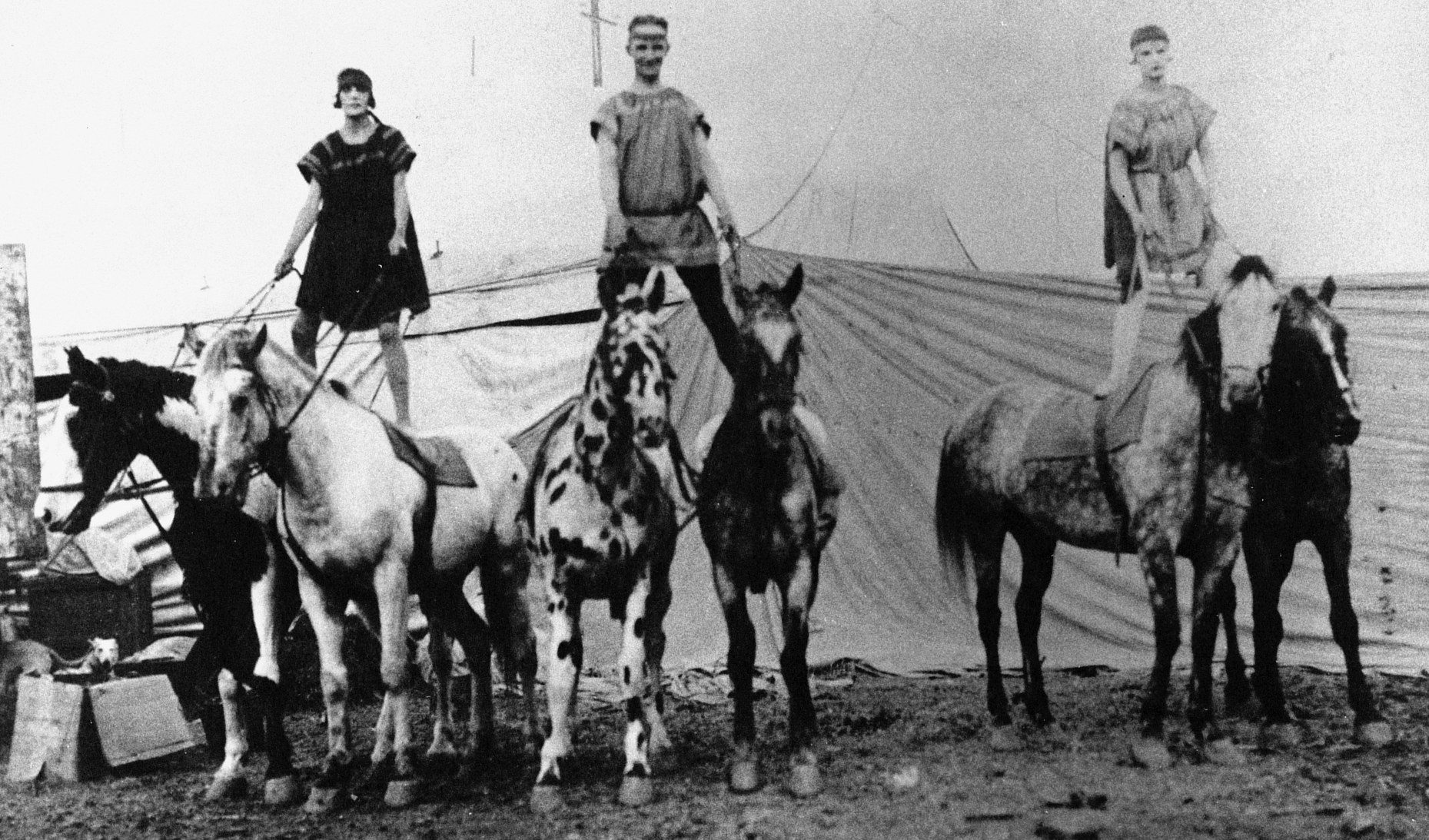
Roman standing act 1914

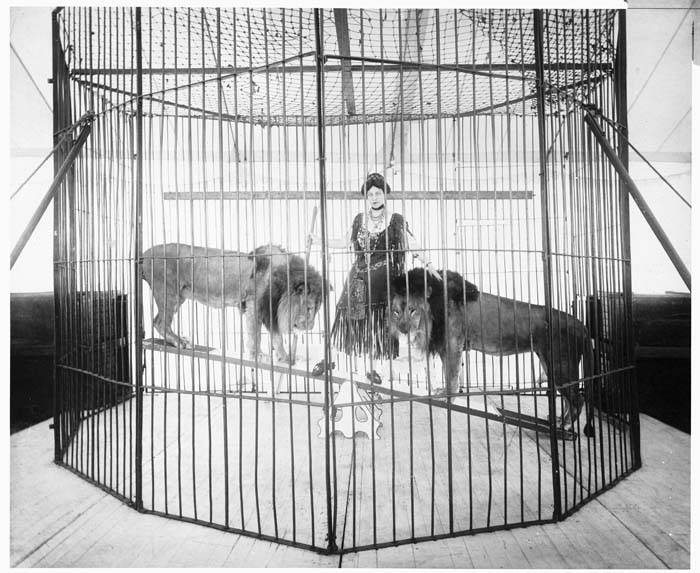
Mrs. Dwyer on seesaw with two lions 1917

== Names ==
- Al G. Barnes Circus
- Al G. Barnes Wild Animal Circus
- Al G. Barnes and Sells-Floto Circus (1937–38)
- Al G. Barnes and Sells-Floto Circus Presenting Ringling Bros. and Barnum & Bailey Features (1938)

== See also ==
- List of circuses and circus owners
- Maricopa Slim
