= Omni processor =

Group of physical, biological or chemical treatments to process fecal sludge

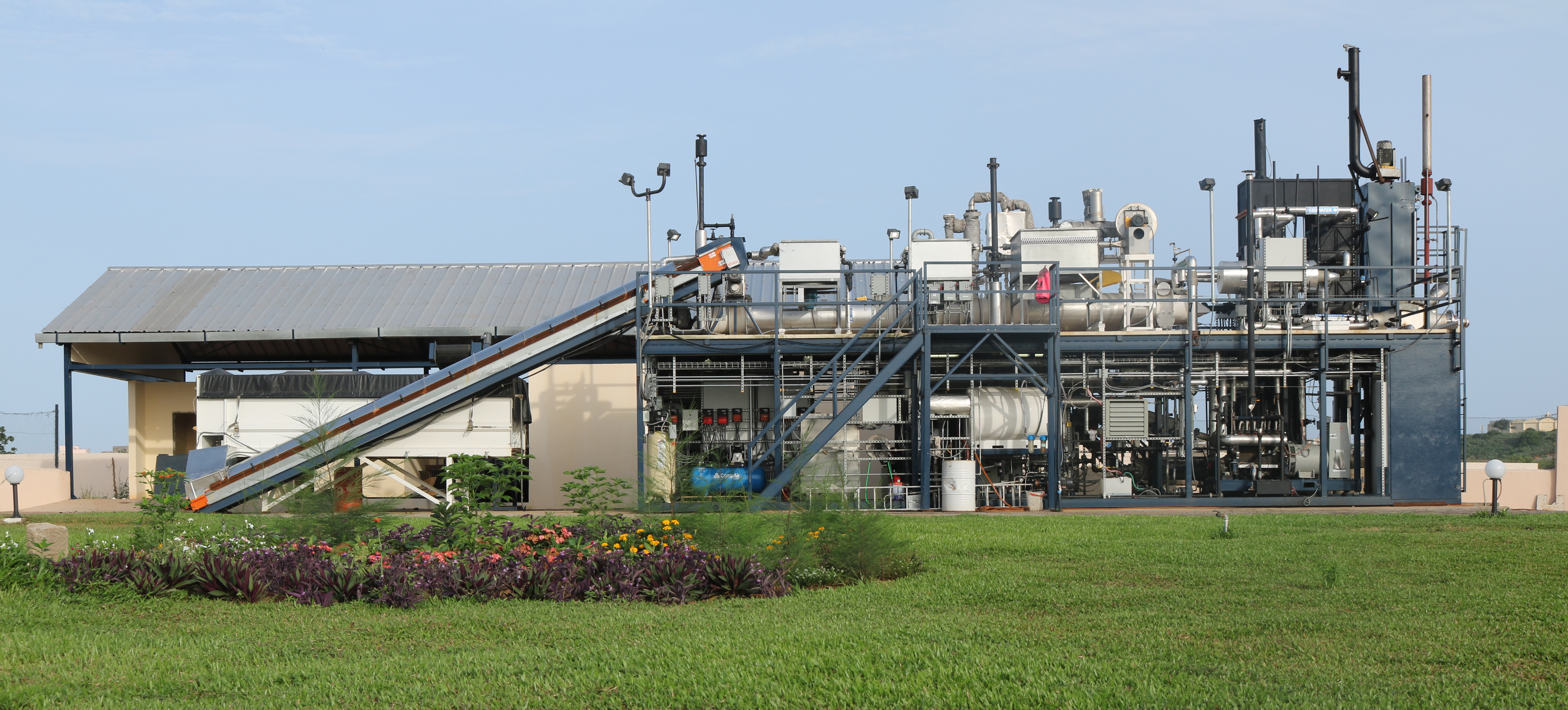
Omni Processor pilot plant by Sedron Technologies treating fecal sludge in Dakar, Senegal

Omni processor is a term coined in 2012 by staff of the Water, Sanitation, Hygiene Program of the Bill & Melinda Gates Foundation to describe a range of physical, biological or chemical treatments to remove pathogens from human-generated fecal sludge, while simultaneously creating commercially valuable byproducts (e.g., energy). Gases from feces are separated from common air, then these collected gases from feces are compressed and used as fuel. An omni processor mitigates unsafe methods in developing countries of capturing and treating human waste, which annually result in the spread of disease and the deaths of more than 1.5 million children.

Rather than a trademark, or a reference to a specific technology, the term omni processor is a general term for a range of self-sustaining, independently developed systems designed with the same end in mind, to transform and extract value from human waste — using various technological approaches, including combustion, supercritical water oxidation and pyrolysis.

In the term, omni refers to the ability of an omni processor to treat a wide variety of waste streams or fuel sources.

== Background ==
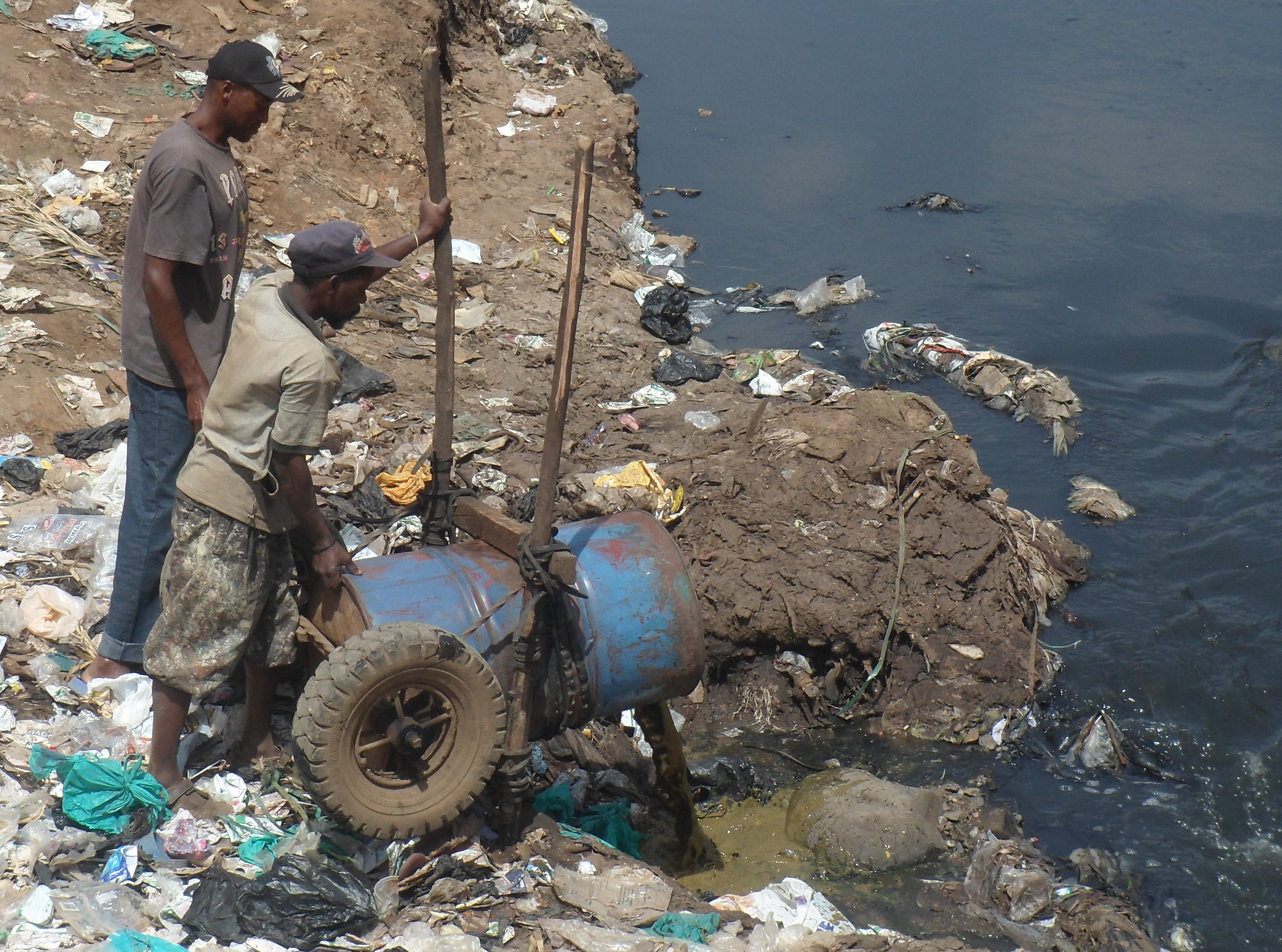
The omni processor was developed to provide a low-cost method of treating human waste which would otherwise be disposed of by such unsanitary means as river dumping

Since 2012, the Bill and Melinda Gates Foundation has been funding research into omni processors. An omni processor is any of various types of technologies that treat fecal sludge, also known as septage to remove pathogens and simultaneously extract byproducts with commercial value, for example energy or soil nutrients, the latter which could be reused in agriculture. The omni processor program, which targets community-scale solutions that may optionally combine sludge and solid waste processing, complements the foundation's pit latrine emptying ("omni-ingestor") and "Reinvent the Toilet" programs.

== Challenges ==
The omni processor is targeted as a solution for developing countries, although challenges around technical and financial aspects remain. Omni processors and omni ingestors are being designed to provide an alternative to sewerage system-based technologies. They are also intended to address the large number of existing pit latrines which lack a supporting infrastructure of fecal sludge collection and processing when the pits are full. Sludge from pit latrines has to be removed from the pits for treatment and disposal either by pumping (if the fecal sludge is sufficiently liquid) or by manual emptying with shovels or other devices (in India, this practice is called manual scavenging). Despite new low-cost pumps being developed, only a small fraction of sludge is safely extracted and treated currently in many African and Asian cities.

== Examples ==
=== Biomass Controls PBC ===
Biomass Controls PBC is a U.S. Delaware public benefit corporation that delivered the first biogenic refinery (OP) prototype to New Delhi, India, in 2014 in partnership with the Climate Foundation. This system was designed to process non-sewered sanitation for populations between 100 and 10,000 people. The prototype was funded by the Bill and Melinda Gates Foundation. In 2016 a biogenic refinery was delivered to Kivalina, Alaska, for the processing of urine-diverting dry toilets (UDDTs) as part of the Alaska Water & Sewer Challenge. In 2017, three systems were shipped to India and installed in the cities of Wai, Warangal and Narsapur in partnership with Tide Technocrats. In 2018 a prototype was shown that can generate electricity (mCHP) from the thermal energy from the processing of fecal sludge, at the Bill and Melinda Gates Foundation reinvented toilet event in Beijing, China. In 2019, a system was set up at a dairy farm to process the separated solids from cow manure. This system demonstrated a significant reduction in greenhouse gas emissions while reducing solids volume by over 90% and producing biochar.

=== Sedron Technologies ===
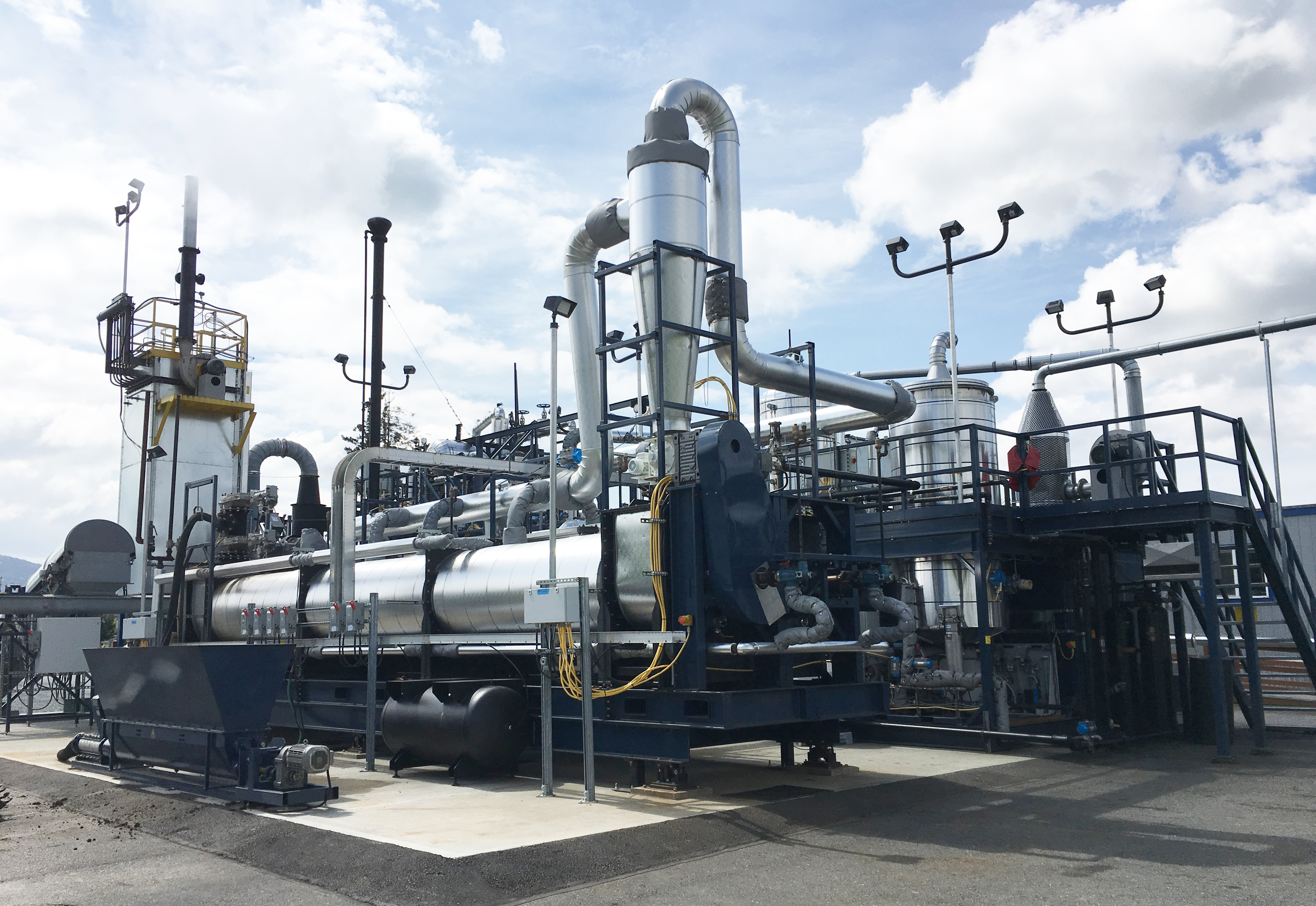
Omni processor (sewage sludge treatment system using combustion) at Sedron Technologies' headquarters in the U.S.

The U.S.-based company Sedron Technologies (formerly Janicki Bioenergy) presented in 2014 a prototype using combustion. Their process is a sewage sludge treatment system that produces drinking water and electrical energy as end products from sewage sludge. Manufactured by Sedron Technologies, the proof of concept model was funded by the Bill and Melinda Gates Foundation. The S100 prototype model can produce 10,800 liters of drinking water per day and 100 kW net electricity. A larger model under development, the S200, is designed to handle the waste from 100,000 people, produce 86,000 liters of drinking water per day and 250 kW net output electricity. These systems are designed to provide a "self-sustaining bioenergy" process.

The treatment process first involves boiling (or thermally drying) the sewage sludge, during which water vapor is boiled off and recovered. A dry sludge is left behind which is then combusted as fuel to heat a boiler. This boiler produces steam and the heat necessary for the boiling process. The steam is then used to generate electrical energy. Some of this electrical energy is used for the final water reverse osmosis purification stages to produce safe drinking water, and to power ancillary pumps, fans and motors. The process immediately uses the solid fuel it produces, and therefore the process does not make a solid fuel product as an end product.

A pilot project of Sedron Technologies' omni processor was installed in Dakar, Senegal, in 2015 and can now treat the fecal sludge of 50,000-100,000 people.

=== Climate Foundation ===
The U.S.-based NGO Climate Foundation, in collaboration with Stanford University, has built several pilot-scale reactors to treat human waste and turn it into biochar, which can be used as an agricultural soil amendment.

=== Duke University and 374Water ===
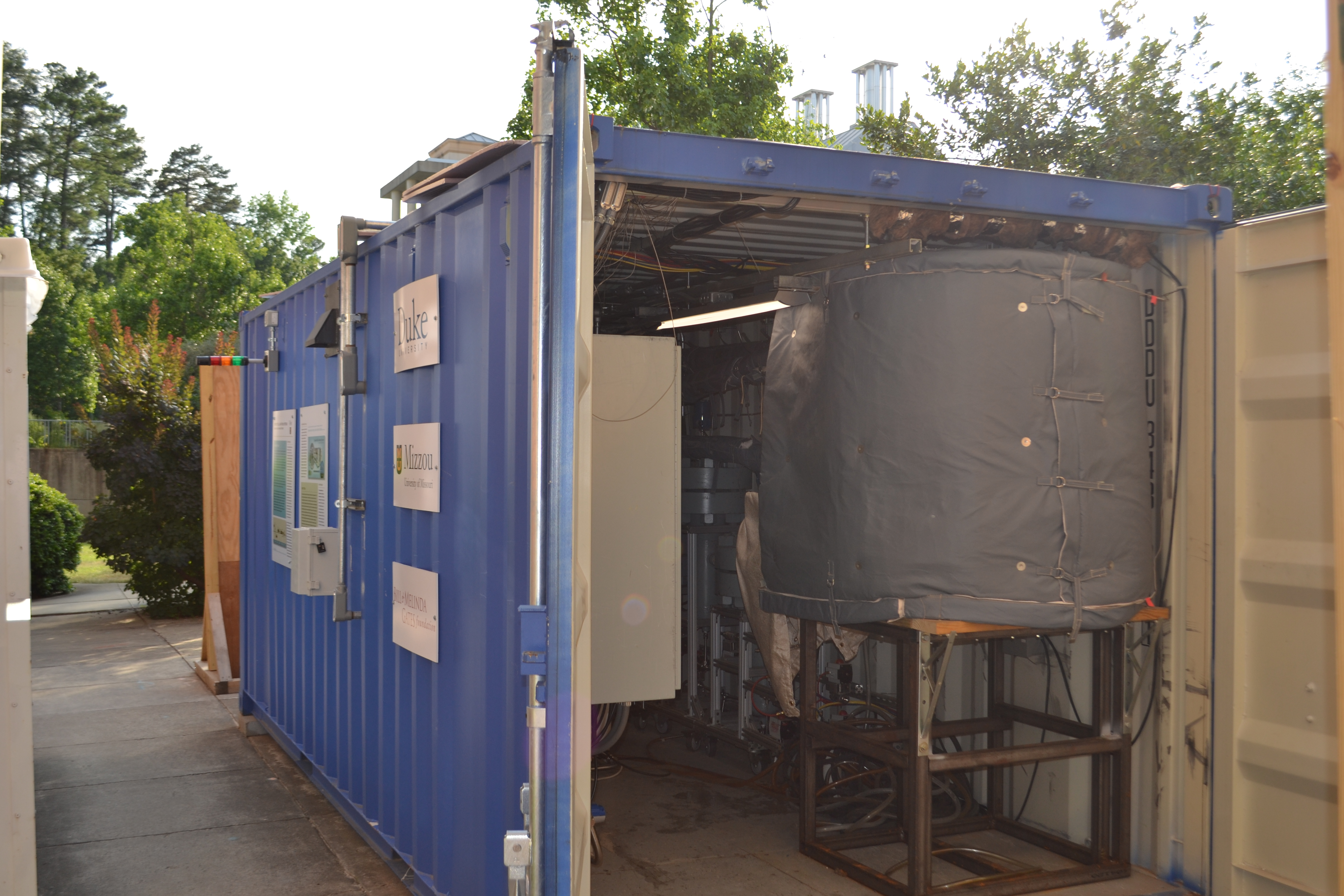
Pilot omni processor for fecal sludge treatment by supercritical oxidation at Duke University, U.S.

Scientists at Duke University in the U.S. have developed and are testing a pilot fecal sludge treatment unit that fits in a 20-foot shipping container and treats the fecal matter of roughly 1000 people using a new supercritical water oxidation (SCWO) process. The SCWO technology can covert any type of organic waste (fecal, food waste, paper, plastic, etc.) to energy and clean water.

The waste (sludge) is reacted with air at temperatures and pressures above the critical point of water (374 °C, 221 Bar) to convert all of the organics into clean water and CO_{2} in seconds. Byproducts include distilled water, clean water which contains suspended inorganic minerals that can be utilized as fertilizers. The unit generates more than 900 liters of water for each ton of processed waste and the water can be processed further to drinking water.

The continuous process utilizes the energy embedded in the waste, thus enabling operating off-the-grid. 374Water is a Duke University spin-off company aiming to commercialize the SCWO technology.

=== Unilever ===
Unilever PLC in the United Kingdom is developing a pyrolysis-based fecal sludge treatment unit designed to serve over 2000 people.

== Related research efforts ==
The omni processor initiative for processing fecal sludge is being complemented by an effort to develop new technologies for improved pit latrine emptying (called by the Gates Foundation the "omni ingestor") and by the Reinvent the Toilet Challenge. The latter is a long-term research and development effort to develop a hygienic, stand-alone toilet. It is focused on "reinventing the flush toilet". The aim is to create a toilet that not only removes pathogens from human excreta, but also recovers resources such as energy, clean water, and nutrients (a concept also known as reuse of excreta). It should operate "off the grid" without connections to water, sewer, or electrical networks. Finally, it should cost less than 5 US-cents per user per day.

== Society and culture ==
=== Media attention ===
In a publicity stunt in late 2014, Bill Gates drank the water produced from Sedron Technologies' omni processor system, causing widespread media attention. In early 2015, Gates appeared on Late Night With Jimmy Fallon and challenged Fallon to see if he could taste the difference between water from this particular "omni processor" or bottled water.

The project was covered in a Netflix documentary mini-series Inside Bill's Brain: Decoding Bill Gates.
