= Phoebe Judson =

Canadian author and pioneer

Phoebe Goodell Judson
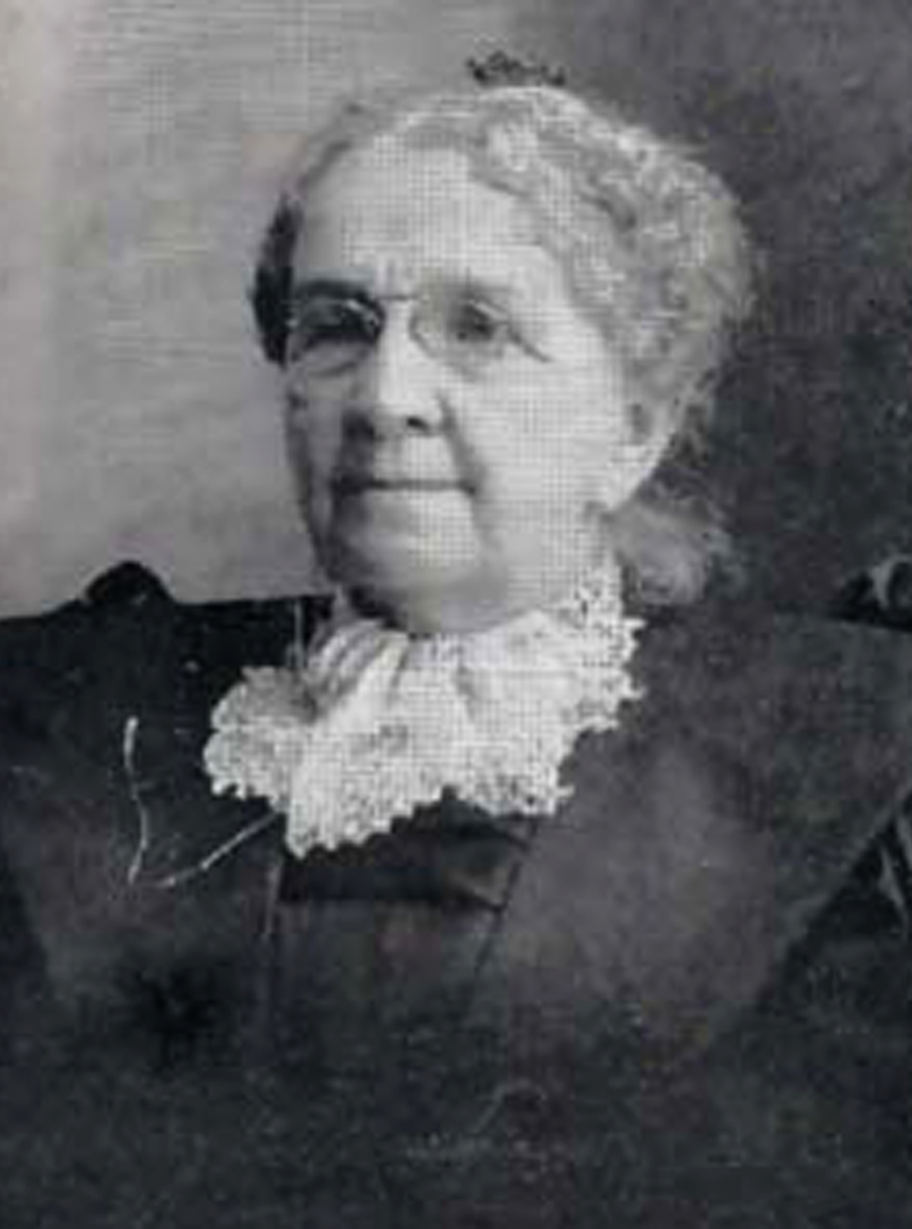
- Born: Phoebe Newton Goodell; October 25, 1831; Ancaster, Upper Canada
- Died: January 16, 1926 (aged 94); Lynden, Washington
- Known for: Named and established Lynden, Washington
- Political party: Republican Party
- Spouse: Holden Allen Judson
- Children: Anna Judson; Charles La Bonta Judson; George Holden Judson; Mary Judson; Carrie Judson (died in infancy); Skoqualamooch "Jack" Judson (adopted) foster children: John Marshall McClanahan; Horace Greeley McClanahan; Nora McClanahan; Daniel Abbott Jr. McClanahan
- Relatives: Isaac N. Ebey (son-in-law's father)

Phoebe Goodell Judson (October 25, 1831 – January 16, 1926; sometimes called Phoebe Newton Judson) was a Canadian and American pioneer and author. Along with her husband, Holden Judson, she founded the city of Lynden, Washington. In 1886, she started the Northwest Normal School, which would become Western Washington University.

Judson kept a diary of her experiences following March 1, 1853 (the day she and her family left for Washington Territory), which she later abridged and rewrote into A Pioneer's Search for an Ideal Home: A Personal Memoir, published shortly before her death.

Because of the large role she played during the 1870s through 1890s in the development of the Nooksack Valley (including giving Lynden its name), she is often referred to as the "Mother of Lynden".

== Life ==
=== Background ===
Born Phoebe Newton Goodell on October 25, 1831, Judson was born in Ancaster, Canada, the second eldest of eleven children with her twin sister Mary Weeks Goodell, and named after her father's sister, Phebe Goodell. Her parents were Jotham Weeks "J. W." Goodell, a Presbyterian minister descended from British colonists, and Anna Glenning "Annie" Bacheler. In 1837 her family emigrated to Vermilion, Ohio, where she and her siblings were raised.

On June 20, 1849, at the age of 17, Judson married Holden Allen Judson (born mid-1827), with whom she had grown up. (Holden's only sibling, Lucretia "Trecia" Judson, had been a close friend of Phoebe's in Vermilion.) The Judsons lived in Holden's parents' home in Vermilion. Their first child, Anna "Annie" Judson, was born the following year.

Following the Donation Land Claim Act, the Goodells traveled to the Oregon Territory in 1851, leaving Phoebe and her elder brother William behind. Judson's twin sister Mary and her fiancé Nathan W. Meloy settled in Willamette, Oregon (today part of West Linn) and J. W. Goodell named and established the town of Grand Mound, Washington, with his wife and younger children, where he took up a job as postmaster and part-time minister alongside George F. Whitworth (who would later found Whitworth University).

Inspired by her family, and Holden's desire for independence from his parents, Judson set off for the month-old Washington Territory with Holden and Annie on March 1, 1853, a few days following her brother William's wedding to Maria Austin, both of whom would take the same Westward route the following year and witness the Ward Massacre.

=== Overland Trail ===
Upon the outset of Judson's emigration to the American West, she laid out the criteria for her "ideal home":

It should be built by a mountain stream that flowed to the Pacific ... and nothing should obstruct our view of the beautiful, snow-capped mountains.

— Phoebe Judson, A Pioneer's Search for an Ideal Home, p. 9

Boarding a train to Cincinnati, Ohio, they reached St. Louis, Missouri by steamboat, where they transferred to a smaller steamer headed for Kansas Landing (now Kansas City, Missouri). Here they traveled two miles (3.2 km) to West Port, Missouri (now part of Kansas City), where they roomed in a hotel for five weeks, making preparations for their journey and building their wagon. Having read Uncle Tom's Cabin, Judson disapproved of the hotel's use of slaves and even argued on behalf of them with the landlady.

In West Point they allowed a "young Scandinavian" named Nelson to ride with them, and in turn were invited to join the wagon train of Rev. Gustavus Hines, made up of six covered wagons (including the Judson's) and a carriage. Phoebe and Holden traveled with four oxen (Tom, Jerry, and Nelson's—Berry and Buck) and a cow. The parties who made up the caravan were:

- Holden and Phoebe Judson, Annie Judson, and Nelson.
- Gustavus and Lydia Hines (née Bryant), Lydia's sister, and Lucy Ann Lee, their adopted daughter.
- Jeddadiah "Diah" Hines, his wife, and his daughter.
- Harvey K. Hines, his wife, and his wife's sister.
- Mr. Bryant, his wife, and their children Alta Bryant (3) and Lee Bryant (1).
- Mr. Leonard, his wife, and possibly children.

The Hines–Judson Wagon Train left West Point of May 1, 1853, and by the following Sunday (May 8) the Leonards abandoned the train because Gustavus Hines insisted on resting on Sunday, which they felt was dangerous and wasteful (the Judsons were inclined to agree, but stayed with Hines because they had elected him captain). Incidentally, the Hines–Judson Wagon Train surpassed all the caravans which did not rest on Sunday (including the Leonards'), because their oxen could keep their strength. On June 26, 1853, Judson gave birth to her second child, Charles La Bonta "Bonta" Judson (named after La Bonta Creek in Wyoming, where he was born, upon the suggestion of Gustavus Hines).

The wagon train reached Independence Rock on July 3 and Devil's Gate on July 5, soon after which they were joined by an Irishman and his family. While fording the Snake River in Wyoming, Diah Hines (elder brother of Gustavus Hines) drowned, after which his wife tried to commit suicide.

When the wagon train finally reached the Columbia River, the Judsons left their caravan (including Nelson) and headed for Willamette, Oregon, to see Judson's twin sister, Mary Meloy. Leaving their cattle with the Meloys till spring, the Judsons hired American Indians to canoe them to Grand Mound, Washington, where they claimed the 320 acres (1.3 km^{2}) adjacent to the Goodells. Along the way Judson began to learn Chinook Jargon, which she would eventually speak fluently.

=== Grand Mound and Claquato ===
While living in Grand Mound, the Judsons became well acquainted with the native Chehalis Indians (who lived in various parts of the Judson acreage), striking a friendship with one called Dean Clark, who taught them Chinook Jargon while they taught him "Boston la longe" (English). The Chehalis practiced minor head flattening, a practice then common throughout all Coast Salish Indian tribes.

After an orphaned 10-year-old Chehalis boy named Skoqualamooch escaped execution by his tribe in the winter of 1853, the Judsons adopted him and gave him the name "Jack Judson" at his own request. That same year, Grand Mound was visited by Isaac Stevens, the newly appointed first governor of Washington. On the advice of the Grand Mounders, Stevens set up a temporary capital in Olympia (which would eventually become the official state capital).

After building a log cabin in Grand Mound, however, the Judsons discovered that the ground was gravelly and infertile. In 1854 they moved twelve miles (19 km) south to Claquato, Washington, along the Chehalis River. Here the ground was fertile, but the scenery did not meet the criteria for Judson's "ideal home". The ground was so fertile, in fact, that the Judsons could not efficiently store their harvested crops before the rainy season. Additionally, they were forced to purchase two dogs (Lion and Tige) to keep bears from eating their crops and livestock.

That same year Judson's brother William Goodell, with his wife and three children, came across the plains to Claquato with Holden's parents and sister Trecia (who married U.S. Marshal George W. Corliss and moved to Olympia soon after).

=== Puget Sound War ===
In 1855, at the outset of the Puget Sound Indian War, Holden's parents moved in with the Judsons. While the native Chehalis Indians were not openly hostile in Claquato, they began touring each of the settlers' homes, taking inventory of their possessions, so that in the event of a takeover the spoils would be evenly split. When a small band of Indians led by "Pug Ugly" tried to take over the Judson's land, Judson prevented her husband from killing them, feeling that such an action would only increase tensions.

Eventually the inhabitants of Claquato were evacuated to the Claquato Stockade Fort (commanded by Edwin Davis), some of whom suffered attacks of hysteria. The Judsons hid most of their possessions near their house, taking only what was necessary. Though nights were spent in the stockade fort, Judson, along with Holden, Jack (who had refused to join the Indian resistance), and Holden's father, spent the day harvesting their acreage while Annie and Bonta stayed with Holden's mother.

Many of Judson's friends and neighbors were ambushed and massacred during the Indian War. Judson's sister-in-law, Trecia Corliss, and her husband George Corliss were spending the evening with customs-collector Isaac N. Ebey when he was beheaded by a band of Haida Indians. Trecia survived by faking death, and George escaped out the back window of Ebey's house.

After the end of the Puget Sound Indian War, Judson witnessed the execution of Chief Leschi (the war's instigator), which she deeply opposed, feeling he had been deceived into starting the rebellion. That same year, in 1858, Holden was elected by the Democratic Party to the Washington State Legislature. The Judsons temporarily moved in with George and Trecia Corliss (who lived in Olympia) while the legislature was in session.

=== Olympia and Whidbey Island ===
While in the legislature, Holden became friends with John A. Tennant, a homesteader from Whatcom County. Inspired by Tennant (who later gave his name to Tennant Lake in Ferndale, Washington) and the influx of shipping in Bellingham Bay, Holden, with George Corliss, invested in Whatcom County lots and donated money for the construction of a small trail to Whatcom (the town which would eventually become Bellingham).

In 1859, Holden sold the Claquato acreage for $4,000 plus other provisions. The Judsons rented a frame house in Olympia with the intention of eventually buying more acreage, and Holden's parents bought a home near Olympia and lived by themselves. Holden himself opened a grocery store as a source of income. When Olympia was incorporated on January 28, 1859 (the first incorporated town in Washington), the Judsons were among its first citizens.

On December 17, 1859, Judson gave birth to George Judson (named after Judson's brother-in-law, George Corliss). Three years later, in 1862, Judson gave birth to her fourth unadopted child, Mary Judson. Mary was raised in part by George and Lucretia Corliss, who had no children.

Lucretia, weakened by her fear of American Indians ever since escaping during Isaac Ebey's beheading, was removed by her husband to Las Cruces, California (in Santa Barbara County) near the end of the Civil War in 1864. In Las Cruces she made a full recovery and invited the Judsons and her parents to emigrate.

Judson believed that Las Cruces might be the "ideal home", and she and Holden planned to leave their unprosperous grocer business. However, on January 16, 1864, Mexican bandits robbed the Corlisses, trapped them in their home, and burned them alive. The Judsons moved instead to Whidbey Island in 1866. Judson gave birth to Carrie Judson in 1869, but the child died of pertussis a month later.

In 1871, Holden met James Alexander Patterson (brother of U.S. Senator David T. Patterson), a colonel who owned land adjacent to Squahalish, a Nooksack Indian camp in the Nooksack Valley of Whatcom County. Like many Washingtonian bachelors at the time, he had married an American Indian (a young Lummi princess known as Lizzie), building a small cabin in 1860. Patterson treated Lizzie as a slave and left her to run the farm with Ned, a young Indian hand, while he was on business in Olympia. Lizzie and Ned eloped to Sumas (then the site of another Indian encampment), leaving behind Patterson's two young daughters, Dollie and Nellie. Patterson refused to allow Lizzie see her children again, but was unable to keep up the farm or take care of the children on his own. He convinced the Judsons to foster his daughters and executed a quitclaim deed in favor of Judson for his 160 acres (0.65 km^{2}) and 20 cattle.

=== The Squahalish Plateau ===
On March 1, 1871, Judson and Holden, with Dollie, Nellie, and their sons Bonta and George (now 17 and 12, respectively), moved to the Nooksack Valley. Judson's daughter Annie had married Eason Ebey (son of the beheaded Isaac Ebey), and her second daughter Mary stayed on Whidbey Island in order to attend school for another six months. When Judson returned to the island in September 1871 to retrieve Mary, Eason Ebey read her the poem Hohenlinden (by Thomas Campbell). This poem would later be the inspiration for the name "Lynden".

Because there were no roads to Whatcom, the Judsons rode a mail steamboat to Bellingham Bay, where they transferred to canoes up the Nooksack River paddled by a Nooksack Indian couple named Sally and Joe. The journey up the Nooksack took two days because of two log jams, called the Big Jam (which was ¾ of a mile long) and the Little Jam. The Patterson property had a small log cabin and a milk barn on the cusp of a plateau near the north bank of the Nooksack, with a view of Mount Baker and the Twin Sisters. Squahalish, Sally and Joe's encampment, was on the opposite bank. Judson later said a "sense of satisfaction came over" her at this location which she had never felt at any other home. The Judsons built a larger, two storey house, using Patterson's original as the kitchen. Once their presence became known, Lizzie Patterson returned to see her children and died shortly after.

The native Nooksack Indians were subject to the influence of a Catholic mission on the Lummi territory. Sally and Joe, along with their children Tom, Holatchie, Mathia, Illead, Miladee, and Lewison, practiced a combination of Catholicism and worship of the "Sothalic Tyee" (Great Spirit). After Judson's arrival Sally had four more children, but only pressed the head of the first.

After the Nooksack's medicine man was killed by an exploding 4th of July cannon, Holatchie, daughter of the Judsons' Nooksack neighbors Sally and Joe, became ill. Lacking a medicine man, Sally sent for the priest from the Lummi mission, who required the remuneration of a firearm and one cow for his visit. After the priest's departure, Judson, who acted as physician in the area, was inspired for the first time to evangelize to her neighbors. She explained the Protestant concepts of universal priesthood and divine grace, which Sally readily embraced.

The Judson's first neighbor, Daniel McClanahan (misspelled as McLellahan), left his three children (John, Horace, and Norah) in the care of the Judsons after his death. McClanahan's youngest child, Daniel, was left with his Nooksack wife Nina (sister of Chief Seclamatum or Indian Jim). Nina died of pulmonary tuberculosis soon after, however, and Daniel joined his siblings with the Judsons. It would be two years before any White woman other than Judson came to the area.

=== Lynden ===
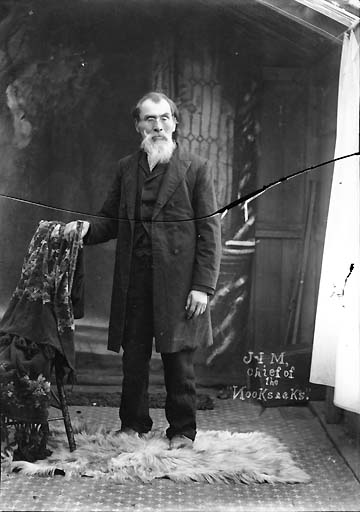
Chief Yelkanum Seclamatan in his house (photo by Urban P. Hadley).

In 1874 the Judsons turned their home into a post office, with Holden as postmaster. Judson was given the task of naming their settlement. Though Holden had suggested "Judson", she picked "Lynden" (from the previously mentioned poem, which describes a remote village beside to a river), changing the spelling from "Linden" to "Lynden" for visual esthesis. Judson's dream was for her kids to have a wonderful life, and good education. Also she wanted the world to have peace in their heart.

That same year Judson's youngest brother Henry and their sickly mother Annie came to live with the Judsons (after J. W. Goodell's death) and Holden was elected to the county commission. On the evening of the election a flood wiped out all their livestock, which their son-in-law Eason Ebey replaced with sheep. The following year Judson became ill with typhoid fever and almost died. After her recovery she purchased a spinning wheel and began making wool socks for the bachelors of Lynden, whom she had already been inviting to every Christmas.

The Methodist missionary Charles M. Tate (from Chilliwack, British Columbia), along with the Staulo Indian "Captain John", came to Lynden in the late 1870s to proselytize the Nooksacks. Using Judson's house as a mission, Tate taught hymns (including "Shall We Gather at the River?") and preached in Halkomelem (a Coast Salish dialect similar to the Nooksack language), admonishing polygamy and superterranean burial. Chief Seclamatan, Sally, and even the homesteader John Tennant, with his wife, converted to Christianity. When the Washington government offered donation land claims to American Indians, Joe and Seclamatan took individual claims and built houses on their land (see picture to right). Later Tennant would move to Lynden and become the first resident minister, his westernized Lummi wife Clara striking up a friendship with Judson.

The Judsons were instrumental in the development of the early infrastructure of Lynden and Whatcom County. At the request of Judson, Holden enlisted the help of the native Nooksack Indians to remove the Little Jam (which they were only too glad to do), working for three months. After the Little Jam was removed, Holden and Phoebe raised $1,500 to hire a contractor, Judge Plaster, to remove the Big Jam, which he completed in 1877. Judson served breakfast and lunch for the Indian workers on both occasions. In addition, she and Holden blazed the first trail to what is now Fishtrap Creek, then the site of a communal fishtrap.

After Washington's admittance into the Union in 1889, the population of Whatcom County began to rapidly grow. Holden began a business making hoops and poles, striking a contract up with a Seattle firm. The Judsons sold their property, keeping only two acres on the Squahalish Plateau to build a frame house. Realizing how flat the area was, they directed emigrants to build the city of Lynden on the plateau. The Judsons reserved two plots in Lynden: Judson organized the construction of the Northwest Normal School (which, through the efforts of George Judson, became a state institution, eventually moving to Bellingham as Western Washington University); and Holden the Judson Opera House. On March 16, 1891, the city of Lynden was officially incorporated. Holden Judson was elected its first mayor.

=== Death ===
Phoebe Judson outlived all her children except the two eldest, Annie and Bonta. She outlived her siblings, raising their orphaned children Elsie, Edward, Joel, and Don (whom she raised until her death). On October 26, 1899, Holden died at the age of 71.

Judson died on January 16, 1926, of natural causes. The entire city of Lynden was shut down (with stores closed and schools dismissed) on January 18 in honor of her funeral and death.

== Family tree ==
Robert Goodale (English immigrant, 1634)
William Goodell	Miss Weeks	Charles Bacheler	(grandmother)
10 siblings	Jotham Weeks Goodell, Sr.	Anna Glenning Bacheler	"Fazzer" Judson	"Mozzer"
William Bird Goodell (c. 1829 – Dec. 16, 1863)	Mary Weeks Goodell (b. Oct. 25, 1831)	Melancthan Goodell	(unknown sibling)	Nathan Edwards "Edward" Goodell	Henry Goodell
Phoebe Newton Goodell (Oct. 25, 1831 – Jan. 16, 1926)	Joel Brigham Goodell	(unknown sibling)	(unknown sibling)	Jotham Weeks Goodell, Jr.	Holden Allen Judson	Lucretia Judson	George W. Corliss
Mary (an American Indian)	Jack Judson (b. c. 1844)	Anna "Annie" Judson (1850–1937)	Eason Ebey	Charles La Bonta Judson (1853–1933)	Gertrude Moore	George Holden Judson (Dec. 17, 1859 – May 19, 1891)	Flora A. Phelps	Mary "Mollie" Judson (1862–1894)
Victor A. Roeder	Effie B. Ebey	Henrietta Ebey	Allen Ebey	Roy Ebey	Allan Judson	Leilla Judson	Raymond Judson
Aryeness Roeder	James Russell Bolster
Phoebe Bolster	Mr. Townley

== See also ==
- Lynden, Washington
- Yelkanum Seclamatum
- Nooksack Valley

== External sources ==
- Judson, Phoebe Goodell (1984) [1925]. A Pioneer's Search for an Ideal Home: A Book of Personal Memoirs. Lincoln, Nebraska: University of Nebraska Press. ISBN 0-8032-2563-6. See also full-text digitized version provided by the Washington State Library: "A Pioneer's Search for an Ideal Home". Bellingham, Washington: Union Printing, Binding and Stationery Co.
- Michaelson, Mary (2006). Memory Book: Friends of Aunt Phoebe Reunion. Lynden, Washington: Lynden Pioneer Museum. pp. 25, 52–52, and 63.
- Koert, Dorothy (1989). The Wilderness Days: Lynden, 1858–1904. Lynden, Washington. p. 13.
- "All Lynden Mourns Passing of Mrs. Judson". Lynden Tribune. January 21, 1926. p. 1.
- "Phoebe Goodell Judson". Western Women's Autobiographies Database. Archived from the original on September 7, 2006.
- "Pioneer History". Lynden Chamber of Commerce. Archived from the original on May 11, 2008.
- "Phoebe Goodell Judson". History & Literature of the Pacific Northwest.
- "Judson, Phoebe (1831–1926)". HistoryLink.
- "Nathan Edward Goodell's store—and landing". Skagit River Journal of History & Folklore.
- "The Goodell family of Vermilion, Ohio, and early settlers of Washington Territory: Parts 1 and 2". Skagit River Journal of History & Folklore.
