= Sterling Dietz =

American magician (born 1991)

- Born: Richard Sterling Dietz; February 15, 1991 (age 35); Whatcom County, Washington, United States
- Occupation: Magician
- Years active: 2004–present
- Spouse: Kaylee Hicks
- Website: magicsterling.com

Richard Sterling Dietz (born February 15, 1991) is an American magician and illusionist. Born and raised in Whatcom County, Washington, he became nationally ranked in junior chess. After attending a magic performance by Jeff McBride in 2004, he was inspired to become a magician. Using the prize earnings from a chess tournament, Dietz funded a two-week magic course taught by a Las Vegas–based magician. He began using the stage name Sterling the Majestic and had performed 400 shows by 2007.

Dietz won several magician awards in the mid-2000s including the top prize and people's choice at the 2006 World Magic Seminar in Las Vegas. At an International Brotherhood of Magicians contest in 2007, he won the people's choice award in the adult division and the top award in the youth division. After graduating from Lynden High School in 2009, Dietz decided to become a full-time entertainer. He moved in 2010 to Cabo San Lucas, Baja California Sur, Mexico, to perform in his production The Magic of Sterling at a San José del Cabo theater. By 2022, he had become the magician in residence at the Rosewood Hotels & Resorts property Las Ventanas al Paraíso in San José del Cabo. Dietz's acts rely on storytelling and he mixes acting, dance, music, drama, and comedy.

== Biography ==
=== Early life and chess career ===
Sterling Dietz was born on February 15, 1991, to Rich and Rochelle Dietz in Whatcom County, Washington, United States, where he grew up. He is of Hawaiian heritage. In his youth, his hobbies were chess, dance, and theater. In elementary school, he attended the private school St. Paul's Primary School in Bellingham, Washington. When he competed in the Bellis Fair Kids' Chess Club tournament in 2002, he received the Mark C. Anderson Coaches' Award For Positional Play — Chess All Star. At the Whatcom County Scholastic Chess Championship in 2001, he placed third in the elementary school category. Before entering eighth grade, Dietz attended the private school Evergreen Christian School, in Lynden, Washington. Competing on behalf of the school, he placed first in the Whatcom County Scholastic Chess Championship in 2002. Drawn by its reputation in chess, he became a student in the Lynden School District. Dietz journeyed across the United States to take part in chess tournaments. On his tours, he coached chess to children in the community. Competing on behalf of Lynden Middle School, Dietz placed first in 2005 in the Whatcom County Scholastic Chess Championships in which three participants tied for first place. Prior to becoming a magician, Dietz achieved national-level ranking in junior chess.

=== Early magic career ===
Dietz attended Jeff McBride's magic performance at Mount Baker Theatre in Bellingham, Washington, in December 2004. Prior to McBride's show, Dietz had watched a magic performance and was impressed, though was convinced it was beyond his abilities. At McBride's show, he told his father, "This is what I was born to do" even though he had not considered magic as a path before. Dietz was captivated by the illusions McBride performed. The same evening, Dietz spent $100 to purchase a set of magic tricks from McBride. He took a seminar taught by McBride the following day where making a card disappear was the first trick Dietz learned. At a birthday party for his mother's friend three days afterwards, Dietz showed his magic for the first time, a card manipulation. After borrowing several magic books from the library, he attempted to perform the illusions himself. Dietz submitted a video of his act to a Las Vegas–based magician who operated a magic school at the six-month mark from watching McBride's performance. The magician accepted him into the program, where he trained under him for two weeks in August 2005. Dietz paid for the program's tuition through the $1,200 in prize earnings he had won at the Theresa Tromp Chess Tournament. In 2006, he put on between one and two shows every week using the stage name "Sterling the Majestic". By 2007, when he was 16 years old, Dietz had put on more than 400 magic performances. As part of his magician attire, he wore a black coat from Hot Topic that reached the ground. When school finished, Dietz traveled by school bus to a magic studio he and his parents established. At the facility, he spent three to four hours refining his existing magic routines and creating tricks.

Dietz received a number of awards in the mid-2000s. The youth event at the 2006 World Magic Seminar in Las Vegas was the debut magic contest he participated in. At the competition, Dietz received two awards: top prize and people's choice. He received the Lance Burton Award and was honored as the "world teen champion of magic". As part of his winnings, Dietz received United States Savings Bonds, a crystal plaque, and the opportunity to appear in Monday Night Magic, an off-Broadway production. He received the top award and people's choice award in the young people's division at the Dallas gathering of the Texas Association of Magicians in 2006. During the 2006 Northwest Ring of Fire in Everett, Washington, he was awarded the top prize and the people's choice prize in the open adult division. The International Brotherhood of Magicians held a contest in Reno, Nevada, in 2007 in which he received the people's choice award in the adult division and the top award in the youth division. He became a member of the organization's youth chapter, the Northwest Ring of Smoke. During the youth event at the 2007 World Magic Seminar, he placed second. The Northwest Ring of Fire organization recognized him with their Magician of the Year title. Beginning at the end of 2007, Dietz opted to stop participating in the junior category of competitions (spanning ages seven to 19). He chose to focus exclusively on the senior category because in the previous two years he had taken first in each significant junior contest he had entered.

While in high school, Dietz established the Sterling Passion Scholarship, which was awarded to two graduates of Lynden Christian Schools or Lynden High School, selected for their dedication to pursuing theater education. He frequently participated in benefit performances such as for the Lynden Relay for Life and the Boys & Girls Clubs of America. Dietz was on the honor roll at Lynden High School, which he graduated from in 2009. In a Northwest Ballet rendition of Aladdin in 2009, Dietz performed as the malevolent genie. He created numerous illusions for the show. Dietz said that he had had prior training in numerous dance styles including breakdancing, Latin, and waltz but not in ballet. His role was centered on dramatic pantomime instead of dancing. Following his high school graduation, Dietz put on private magic performances around the Lynden region and committed to becoming a full-time entertainer.

=== The Magic of Sterling and move to Mexico ===
Beginning when he was an infant, his family brought him to Cabo San Lucas, Baja California Sur, Mexico, on vacations. Dietz inked an agreement with Theater of the City (Spanish: Teatro de la Ciudad) in which he would perform his show The Magic of Sterling four times each week at the city-run San José del Cabo theater between September 2010 and May 2011. Dietz sought a long-term setting for entertaining so that he could deeply concentrate on performing. Getting approval for operating in the theater required upwards of two years. He had planned to do the soft launch in the middle of September but the date needed to be pushed back to October 16. Constructed in the 1940s, the theater was in a state of disrepair despite having undergone renovation in 2007. It had 32 lights but just eight worked. To finance upgrades to the theater, Dietz put on two performances on November 6, followed by two more appearances, which brought in $2,000 to buy the lights and make refurbishments. After several weeks, Jessica Gassman, who had worked as his assistant for five years, resigned to go back to the United States to be with her family. At that time, the government sent him a letter canceling the earlier agreement to use the theater after elections had ushered in a new political administration. The letter informed Dietz that the theater was not available for lease since it was designated solely for cultural activities. He met with the Treasurer of Los Cabos and persuaded him to allow the use of the theater, arguing that the production would attract more visitors and increase tourism spending for local businesses.

The Magic of Sterling had its official opening on November 15, 2010. Roughly 33% of the 400-seat venue was filled. Dietz did the 90-minute show in English, though he spoke Spanish in radio interviews and in a few private performances in the area. Dietz's high school education had included three years of Spanish so he communicated competently in the language. Dietz planned to perform in San José del Cabo for eight months each year, leaving June to September free for taking part in magic conventions to remain involved with other magicians. Joanie Spina served as the show's choreographer and artistic director, while Don Guy served as the lighting designer. The production had four dancers and a chief assistant. Prior to returning to the United States, Gassman, his former lead assistant, spent a week teaching new hires Dietz had chosen from the Los Cabos area. He did not have exclusive use of the theater, which was also used by community theater groups and as a movie theater. It required him to assemble and pack up his set before and after each show. In order, the show's early performances featured these sets: "a Doorway Appearance, Sterling's manipulation act, Miser's Dream, Instant Magician, Paper Balls over the Head, Egg Bag, Origami, Cut-and-Restored Rope, a 'music box' Sub Trunk (with a dancing ballerina on top), Torn-and-Restored Newspaper (with an importance-of-family message), and billiard ball manipulation".

By 2015, Dietz had spent five years working as a magician in Cabo San Lucas. He divided his time between eight months in Cabo San Lucas and the remainder at his Bellingham residence. According to Dietz, he faced difficulties in the city, including getting evicted from a theater. After discovering that theaters and clubs drew limited crowds since visitors to Cabo San Lucas often remained within their resorts, Dietz began going to hotels to put on his magic shows. He served as the magician in residence at the Rosewood Hotels & Resorts property Las Ventanas al Paraíso in San José del Cabo. Dietz married Kaylee Hicks, who is also from Lynden, Washington, and with whom he had partnered on performances since around 2019. She brings to his show professional dancing and is an aesthetician and make-up artist.

== Magic acts and style ==
When Dietz was starting out as a magician, he attempted to emulate the acts he encountered, enabling him to pinpoint effective approaches. In addition to doing illusions, he enhanced his act by introducing music, a dancer, and a visually appealing woman assistant. Dietz's personal experiences and previous sentiments shape a large number of his illusions. Viewing himself as a storyteller, he said he strives to have his viewers feel something beyond "How do you do that?" Dietz aims to transport his attendees to the time in their youth when nothing seemed impossible. His show blends acting, dance, music, drama, and comedy.

In tribute to his Hawaiian roots, he started his performance in 2006 twirling an illuminated poi, a ball attached to a string. He also did sleight-of-hand card magic and stage illusions involving big props. In 2009 and 2010, Dietz performed Restoring the World, a magic trick he used to end his performance. In the act, he tears a newspaper to shreds while he recounts a son longing to be with his dad. He restores the torn pages, producing an image of a world on one side and a family on the other. Dietz tells his audience that when the family is united, the world will fall in step. A 2007 version of the act involved a girl asking her father to join her outdoors for fun activities.

Siegfried & Roy stated, "Sterling is the future of magic." According to The Bellingham Herald's Zoe Fraley, Dietz puts people at ease when he is performing. His welcoming demeanor melts away the stage fright of people he calls on to join him on stage, she said. He is able to do this when coaching a child in how to pose like a magician and causing eggs to disappear and return, according to Fraley. The Statesman Journal journalist Carlee Wright praised Dietz for having "energetic, fast-paced skill and presentation" and including "a dash of the bizarre". Jep Hostetler, who previously served as the International Brotherhood of Magicians president, said of Dietz "This kid is good" and described Dietz's magic as "not old-fashioned" but "new and fresh".
