= Lynden High School =

Public school in Lynden, Washington, US

Location
- 1201 Bradley Road; Lynden, Washington 98264; United States; 48°57′07″N 122°25′42″W

Information
- Type: Public secondary
- Motto: Spirit Pride Tradition of Achievement
- School district: Lynden School District
- Superintendent: David VanderYacht
- NCES School ID: 530462002259
- Principal: Ian Freeman
- Teaching staff: 44.10 (on an FTE basis)
- Grades: 9–12
- Enrollment: 968 (2023–2024)
- Student to teacher ratio: 21.95
- Colors: Green and Gold
- Athletics conference: Northwest Conference 2A
- Nickname: Lions
- Rival: Ferndale High School Lynden Christian High School
- Website: lynden.wednet.edu/lynden-high-school/

Lynden High School (LHS) is a public high school in Lynden, Washington, United States. Lynden High School serves students in grades 9–12 for the Lynden School District.

== Academics ==
In the 2020 U.S. News & World Report annual survey of high schools, Lynden ranked 162nd in Washington and 9,434th nationally.

== Demographics ==
The demographic breakdown of the 931 students enrolled for 2018–19 was:

- Male – 49.2%
- Female – 50.8%
- Native American/Alaskan – 0.2%
- Asian – 2.0%
- Black – 0.5%
- Hispanic – 24.1%
- Native Hawaiian/Pacific islanders – 0.3%
- White – 66.5%
- Multiracial – 6.4%

46.3% of the students were eligible for free or reduced-cost lunch.

== Athletics ==
Lynden High School's teams are named the Lions, and the school colors are green and gold. Lynden offers the following Washington Interscholastic Activities Association (WIAA) sanctioned sports:

- Baseball (boys)
- Basketball (girls and boys)
- Cheer
- Cross country (girls and boys)
- Football (boys)
- Golf (girls and boys)
- Soccer (girls and boys)
- Softball (girls)
- Swimming (girls and boys)
- Tennis (girls and boys)
- Track and field (girls and boys)
- Volleyball (girls)
- Wrestling (girls and boys)

== Notable alumni ==
- Ricardo Martinez, US Federal Judge, graduated from Lynden High School in 1969 and was named Lynden High School's Alumni of the Year in 2018.
- Sterling Dietz, a magician, graduated from Lynden High School in 2009.
