= Lynden Christian Schools =

Coordinates: 48°56′59″N 122°26′43″W

Lynden Christian School
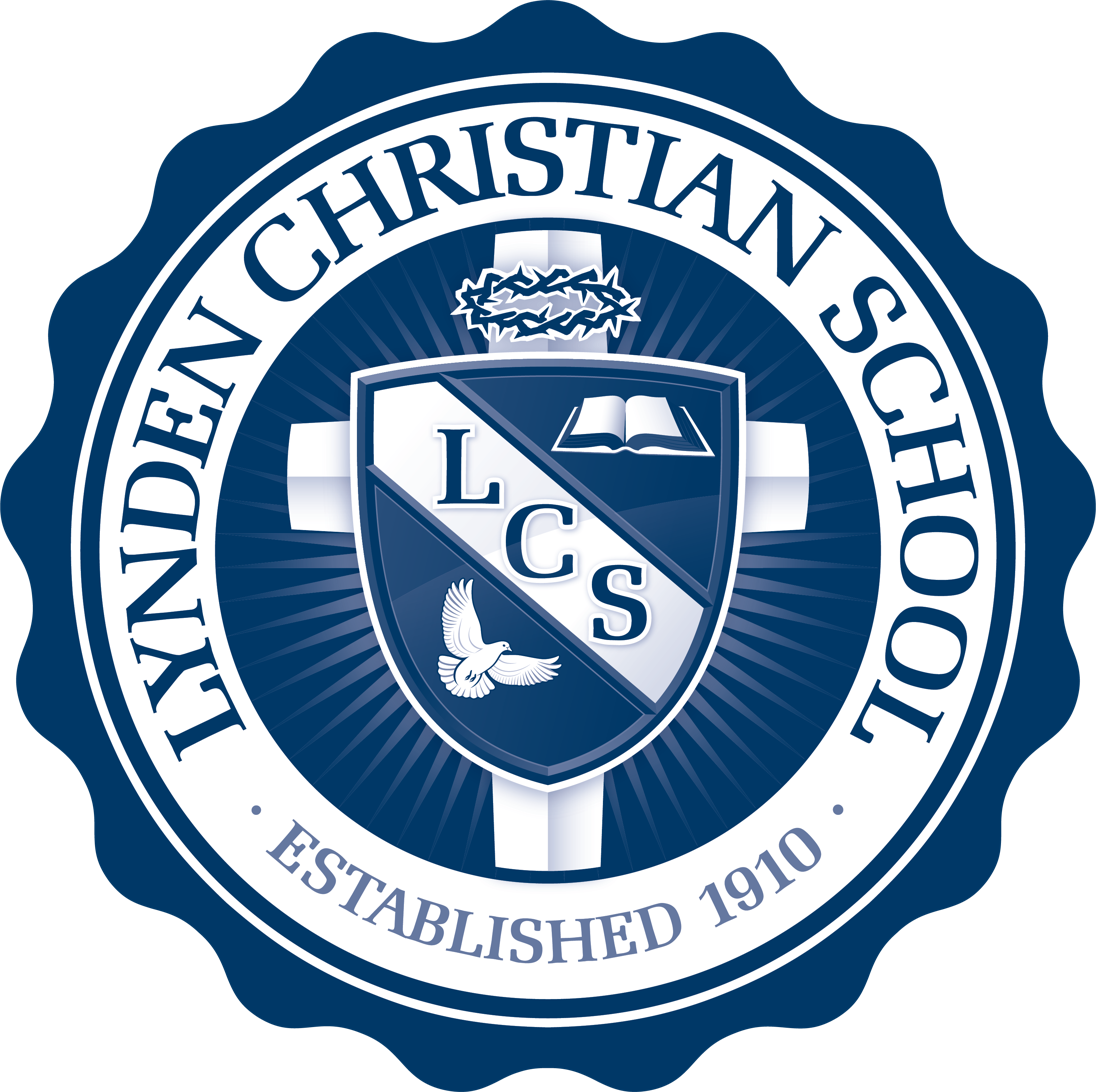

Location
- 417 Lyncs Drive; Lynden, Washington 98264; Lynden, Washington; United States 98264

Information
- Type: Private
- Motto: "Linking head and heart, home and school, child and God."
- Denomination: Non-denominational
- Established: 1910
- Superintendent: Paul Bootsma
- Principal: Don Van Maanen (ES); Aaron Bishop (MS); Craig Johnson (HS)
- Teaching staff: 87 (with 28 additional aides)
- Average class size: 23
- Hours in school day: 6 hrs. 45 min.
- Campus type: Closed campus
- Colors: Navy blue, white
- Song: "Lynden Christian Forward"
- Athletics: Brenda Terpstra
- Sports: Baseball, basketball, cheer, cross country, football, golf, soccer, track, volleyball
- Mascot: Lynx
- Team name: Lyncs (Lynden Christian School)
- Rivals: Lynden High School
- Publication: Lynden Christian Home Bulletin
- Newspaper: Hi Lite
- Yearbook: Excelsior
- Tuition: $5000 (elementary and middle school), $8000 (grades 9-12)
- Communities served: Whatcom County
- Website: www.lyncs.org

Lynden Christian School (abbreviated LCS), often referred to as Lynden Christian (LC), is a non-denominational private Christian school. The school educates 1,300 students in Lynden, Washington, United States.

== Admission requirements ==
- Academic ability and interest (minimum “C” average or better)
- Self-discipline and motivation
- Ability to establish priorities and carry them through
- Emotional maturity needed to adjust to a new language and culture
- Willingness to abide by the school code and United States laws
- A respect for the American culture and religious nature of this school
