= Grand Mound, Washington =

Unincorporated community in Washington, United States

Grand Mound
- CDP
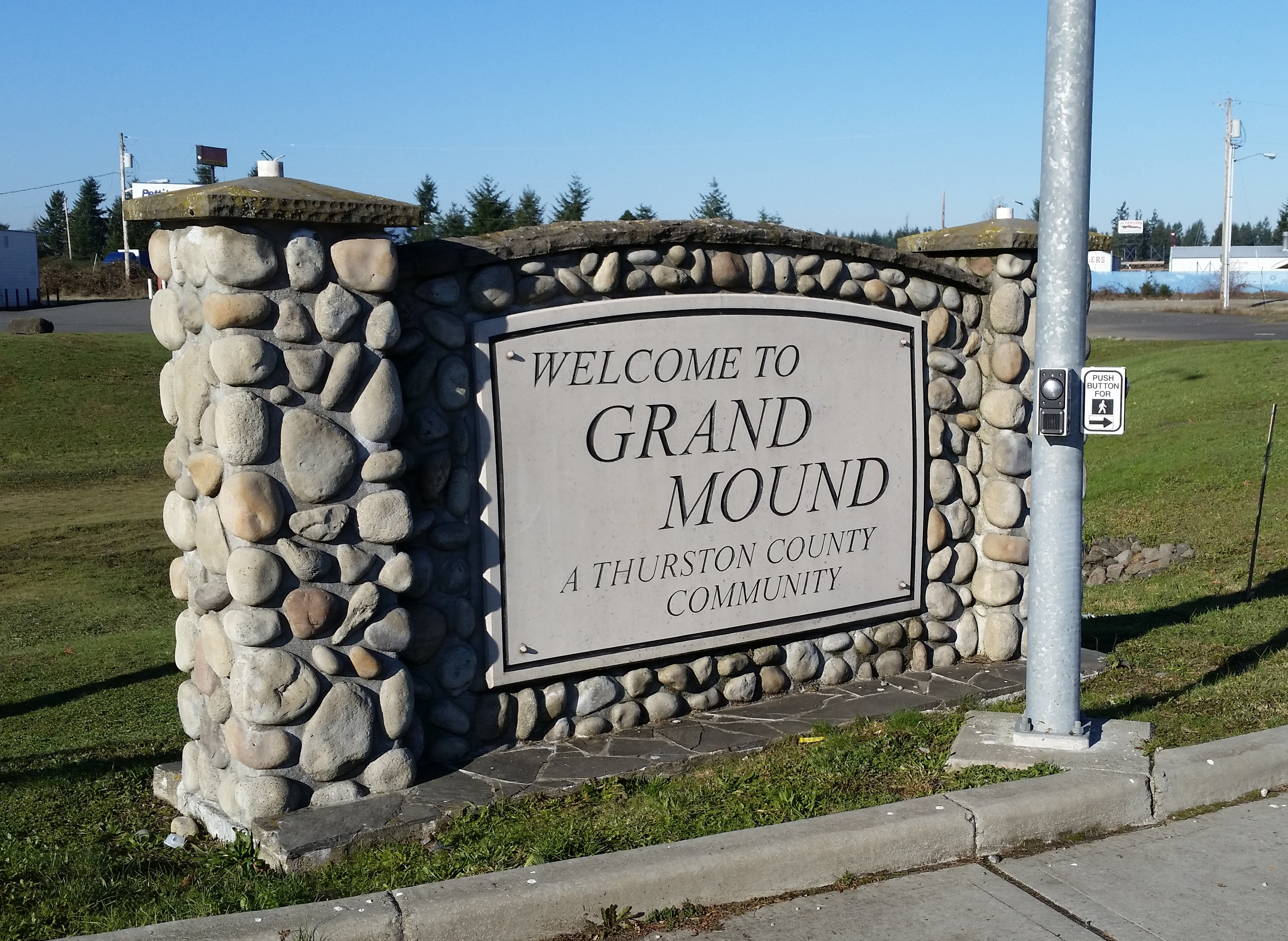
- Town sign for Grand Mound, located at main intersection
- Interactive map of Grand Mound
- Coordinates: 46°48′14″N 123°0′36″W
- Country: United States
- State: Washington
- County: Thurston
- Settled: 1851

Area
  - Total: 3.93 sq mi (10.2 km^{2})
  - Land: 3.93 sq mi (10.2 km^{2})
  - Water: 0.0 sq mi (0 km^{2})
- Elevation: 167 ft (51 m)

Population (2020)
  - Total: 3,301
  - Density: 840/sq mi (324/km^{2})
- Time zone: UTC-8 (Pacific (PST))
  - Summer (DST): UTC-7 (PDT)
- ZIP codes: 98531, 98579
- Area codes: 360, 564
- FIPS code: 53-27890
- GNIS feature ID: 1512250

Grand Mound is a community and census-designated place (CDP) in Thurston County, Washington, United States. It was named and founded by Jotham Weeks Goodell, father of Phoebe Judson, in 1851. The population was 3,301 at the 2020 census. This area uses the 98579 and 98531 zip codes, which also includes Rochester and Gate.

== History ==
Prior to European colonization, the Grand Mound Prairie was home to the Upper Chehalis (q̓ʷay̓áyiɬq̓) people. A large settlement called aqáygt (meaning "long prairie" in the Upper Chehalis language) was located where Grand Mound is today, but settlers burned and razed it after a smallpox outbreak caused by contact with Europeans killed hundreds of indigenous people in the area.

Grand Mound was founded in 1851, with stage service arriving in 1854. Known as Mound Prairie, the community built Fort Henness, which consisted of two blockhouses, in 1855 amid fears over potential Native American attacks during the Puget Sound War, despite the Upper Chehalis abstaining from the conflict. The fort housed 224 people, including Company F of the First Regiment of Washington Territorial Volunteers under the command of Captain Benjamin Lee Henness. The fort never experienced combat. In 1913, the Washington State School for Girls (also known as the State Training School for Girls) was created and opened on 70 acres (28 ha) in 1914. The school was renamed as Maple Lane School in 1959, and closed in 2011.

In the 1920s, strawberries became a major crop in the area, and a processing plant was built, but during the Great Depression the industry failed and the Northern Pacific Railway closed the Grand Mound station. By 1941 the population of the area had grown to about 200 people and the community had a post office along with a store and a single gas station.

On November 6, 1962, voters approved the formation of Thurston County Fire Protection District No. 14, which provided fire suppression, and later emergency medical services. The district began operations from the since abandoned gas station in 1963, later demolishing the aging building to construct a new fire station on the same site, which was completed in late 1971. In September 1979, voters approved the issuance of a $120,000 facilities bond, which funded a new fire station to serve the Michigan Hill area, and the addition of 4 new bays to the main station in Grand Mound. In November 2000, voters approved a $750,000 facilities bond to build a new station on land donated to the district by Thurston County, and to purchase a new water tender. In February 2002, voters approved the merger of Fire District No. 14 into Fire District No. 1, forming Grand Mound - Rochester Fire Department. A new fire station was built to serve Grand Mound in 2007 with proceeds from a $3,500,000 facilities bond voters approved in May 2006. In August of 2009, voters approved the consolidation of Thurston County Fire Protection District No. 11 into Grand Mound - Rochester Fire Department (Fire District No. 1), forming West Thurston Regional Fire Authority on January 1, 2010.

The community became a census-designated place in 1990. In March 2008, a 398-room Great Wolf Lodge opened in Grand Mound, which was majority owned by the Confederated Tribes of the Chehalis Reservation.

== Geography ==
Grand Mound is in the southern part of Thurston County, near the county line with Lewis County, immediately north of Centralia. Interstate 5 and U.S. Route 12 serve the community, with the latter leaving Interstate 5 at the Grand Mound exit to head west to Grays Harbor. According to the United States Census Bureau, the CDP has a total area of 3.93 square miles (10.2 km^{2}), all of it land. It is located on Grand Mound Prairie, which was named after a 125-foot (38 m) tree-covered hill in the area, which was the largest of several similar mounds in the area.

Prairie Creek is the only stream within the town's limits. It flows into the nearby Chehalis River, and the confluence of the two is located immediately southwest of the town. Scatter Creek can be found just north of Grand Mound, where it flows west through the Scatter Creek Wildlife Recreation Area and makes its way to its confluence with the Chehalis River, just south of nearby Rochester.

Just north of Grand Mound is the Scatter Creek Unit, a 915-acre (370.29-hectare) wildlife reserve which contains one of the few remaining areas of south Puget Sound prairie.

== Demographics ==
Historical population
Census	Pop.	Note	%±
1990	1,394		—
2000	1,948		39.7%
2010	2,981		53.0%
2020	3,301		10.7%
U.S. Decennial Census; 2020 Census

As of the census of 2000, there were 1,948 people, 687 households, and 529 families residing in the CDP. The population density was 621.2 people per square mile (239.5/km^{2}). There were 734 housing units at an average density of 234.1/sq mi (90.3/km^{2}). The racial makeup of the CDP was 87.99% White, 0.31% African American, 1.23% Native American, 0.31% Asian, 0.10% Pacific Islander, 6.62% from other races, and 3.44% from two or more races. Hispanic or Latino of any race were 10.16% of the population.

There were 687 households, out of which 38.0% had children under the age of 18 living with them, 57.2% were married couples living together, 12.7% had a female householder with no husband present, and 22.9% were non-families. 16.7% of all households were made up of individuals, and 5.4% had someone living alone who was 65 years of age or older. The average household size was 2.84 and the average family size was 3.13.

In the CDP, the age distribution of the population shows 29.1% under the age of 18, 9.7% from 18 to 24, 30.9% from 25 to 44, 21.2% from 45 to 64, and 9.1% who were 65 years of age or older. The median age was 33 years. For every 100 females, there were 104.6 males. For every 100 females age 18 and over, there were 102.8 males.

The median income for a household in the CDP was $42,153, and the median income for a family was $41,864. Males had a median income of $40,250 versus $24,511 for females. The per capita income for the CDP was $16,008. About 13.5% of families and 14.8% of the population were below the poverty line, including 18.6% of those under age 18 and 12.5% of those age 65 or over.

== Arts and culture ==
=== Historic buildings and sites ===
Several historical markers can be found in Grand Mound. A historical marker in the community commemorates a successful attempt by the townswomen of Grand Mound to vote in Washington territorial elections. Just south of Grand Mound, on Old Highway 99, is an Oregon Trail marker, established in 1916 by the Daughters and Sons of the American Revolution. A monument across from Grand Mound Cemetery marks the former location of Ft. Henness, a stockade built and occupied during the Puget Sound War of 1855-56.

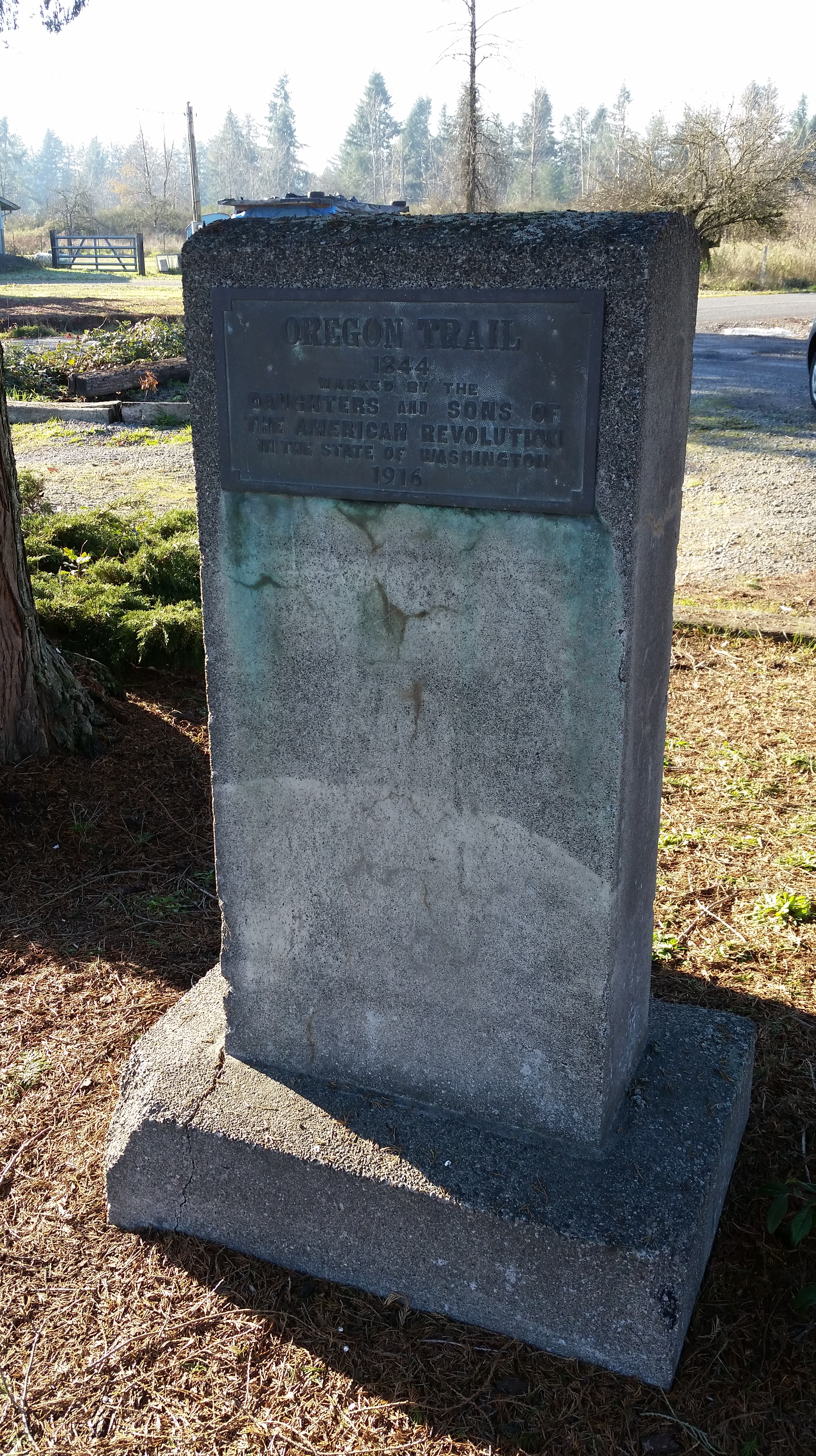
Oregon Trail marker

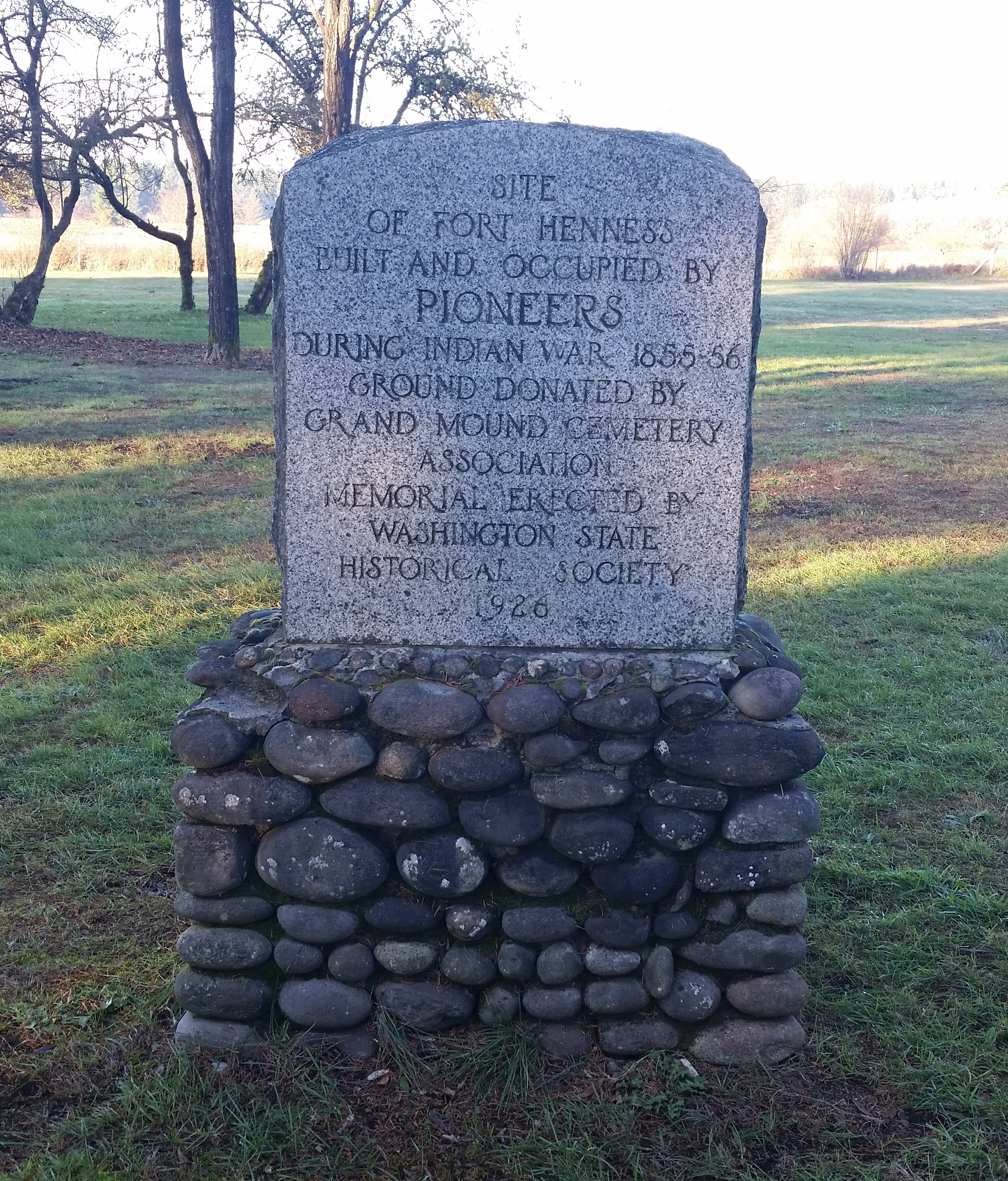
Ft. Henness monument

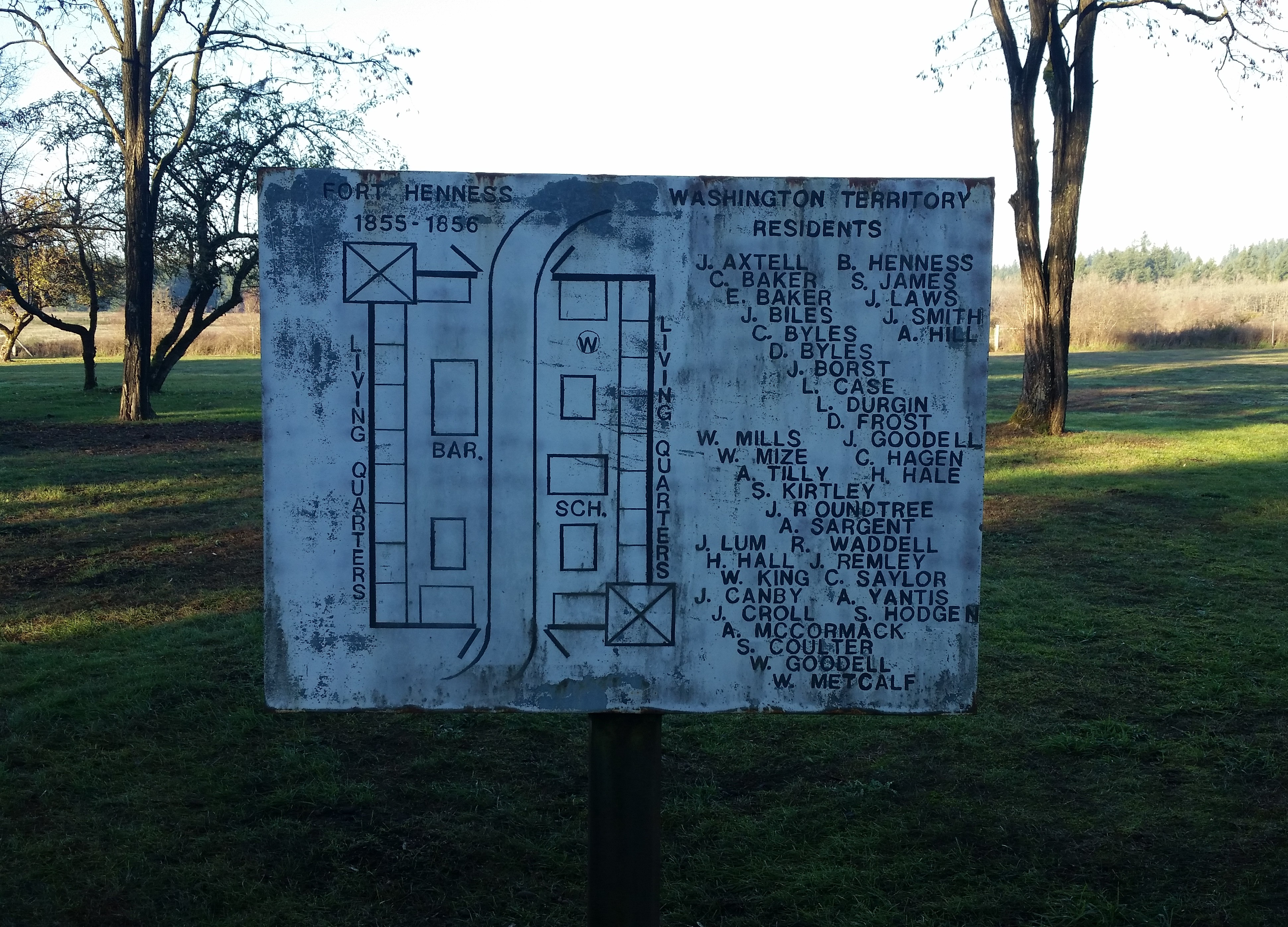
Ft. Henness layout

== Parks and recreation ==
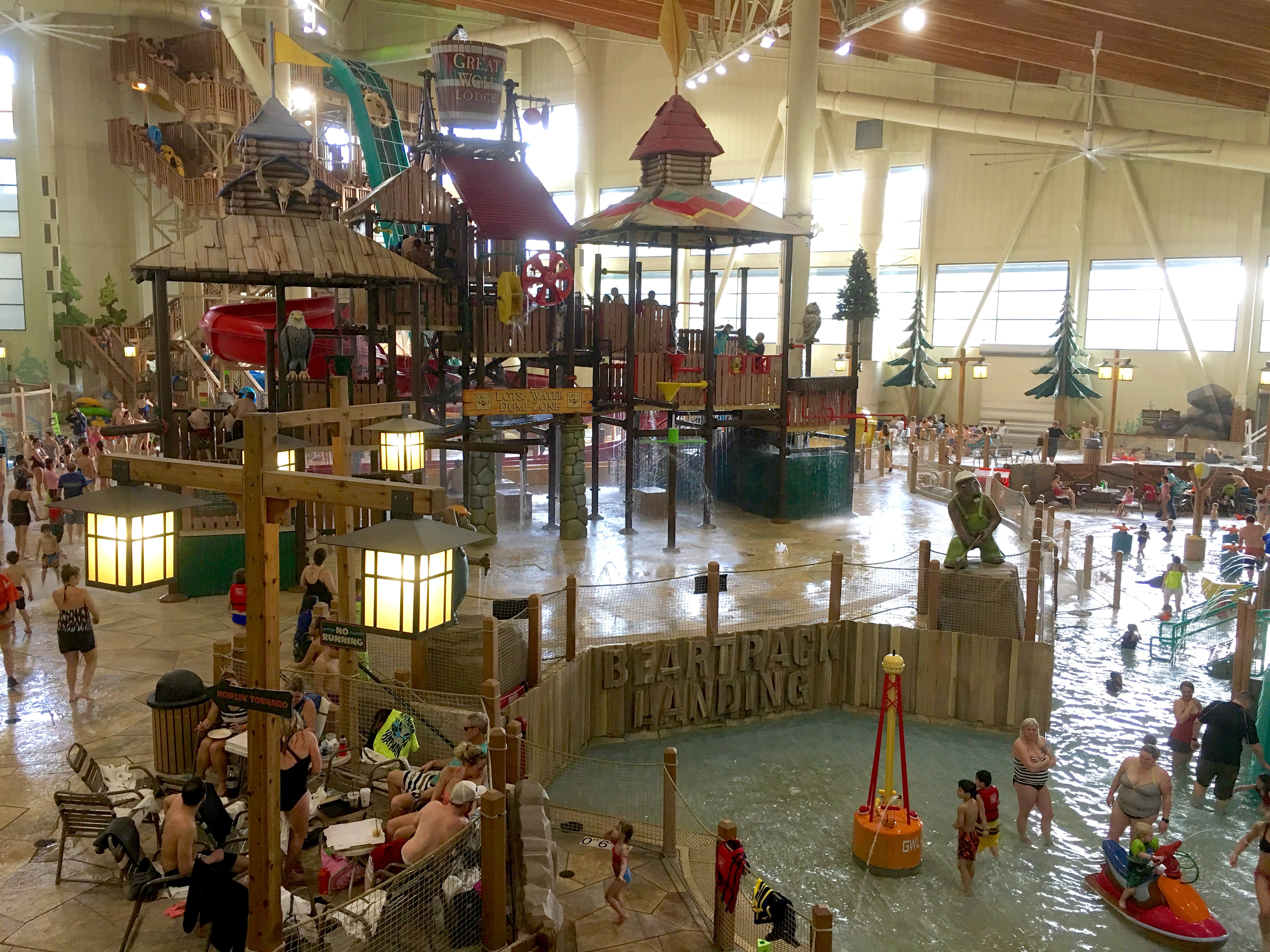
Great Wolf Lodge, interior, 2016

The South Sound Speedway, a Figure 8 racetrack, is immediately northeast of the downtown area. The town is also home to the Great Wolf Lodge, an indoor waterpark and resort, which opened in 2008.

== Government ==
Fire and emergency services are provided by the West Thurston Regional Fire Authority, with a single station located along Sargent Road. Grand Mound lacks a post office. Mail delivery is largely provided by the post office in neighboring Rochester; most locations in Grand Mound have Rochester addresses. A few locations on the south side of Grand Mound have Centralia addresses.

== See also ==
- Mima Mounds Natural Area Preserve
