= Lynden Tribune =

Weekly newspaper published in Lynden, Washington

- Type: Weekly newspaper
- Owner(s): Lynden Tribune & Print Co.
- Founder(s): Charles D. Jones; H. E. Stuart
- Publisher: Michael D. Lewis
- Editor-in-chief: Bill Helm
- Founded: 1908
- Language: English
- Headquarters: 113 Sixth St., Lynden, WA 98264
- Circulation: 12,250 (as of 2022)
- ISSN: 2328-3963
- OCLC number: 17398139
- Website: lyndentribune.com

The Lynden Tribune is a weekly newspaper published in Lynden, Washington.

== History ==
The Lynden Tribune was first published on July 9, 1908. Charles D. Jones was editor and H. E. Stuart was business manager. The duo had purchased the equipment and subscription list of the Lynden Sun-Pilot, which had formed in 1905 after C. A. Sluss purchased the Lynden Sun and Pacific Pilot and consolidated them together. In their first editorial addressed "To The People of Lynden," the two wrote:

"The TRIBUNE comes into your midst without an apology. It has no friends and hopes to make few enemies. Perhaps you'll think it rather a bold and wayward child at first but, as you become better acquainted, we believe it will find a warm place in your heart."

— Charles D. Jones and H. E. Stuart, To The People of Lynden, The Lynden Tribune (July 9, 1908)

In early 1909, the Tribune had been purchased by Dan Cloud, former editor of the Tacoma Daily News. Cloud fell ill and Herman Rosenzweig then became the proprietor on October 19, 1911. A few years later Sol H. Lewis purchased the paper in 1914. He had graduated from University of Washington studying journalism and borrowed $7,500 as a down payment from family. He first edition as owner was published on October 22, 1914. For decades he wrote a column called "The Lynden Gimlet" and operated the paper until his death in 1953. At that time the paper was inherited by his sons William R. "Bill" and Julian M. Lewis. In 1970, the Lewis family acquired the nearby Ferndale Record from longtime owner Ralph W. Pinkerton. Michael Lewis became a Tribune co-owner in 1984 when his uncle Bill Lewis retired. He obtained full ownership after his father Julian Lewis retired in 1992.

In 2025, the Ferndale Record was merged into the Lynden Tribune and the masthead was changed to the Lynden Tribune & Ferndale Record. That same year the paper's owner shuttered its press. The printing of the paper was transferred to a facility run by the Skagit Valley Herald.
