= Northwest Washington Fair =

Annual fair in Lynden, Washington, U.S.

Coordinates: 48°56′13.85″N 122°28′37.17″W

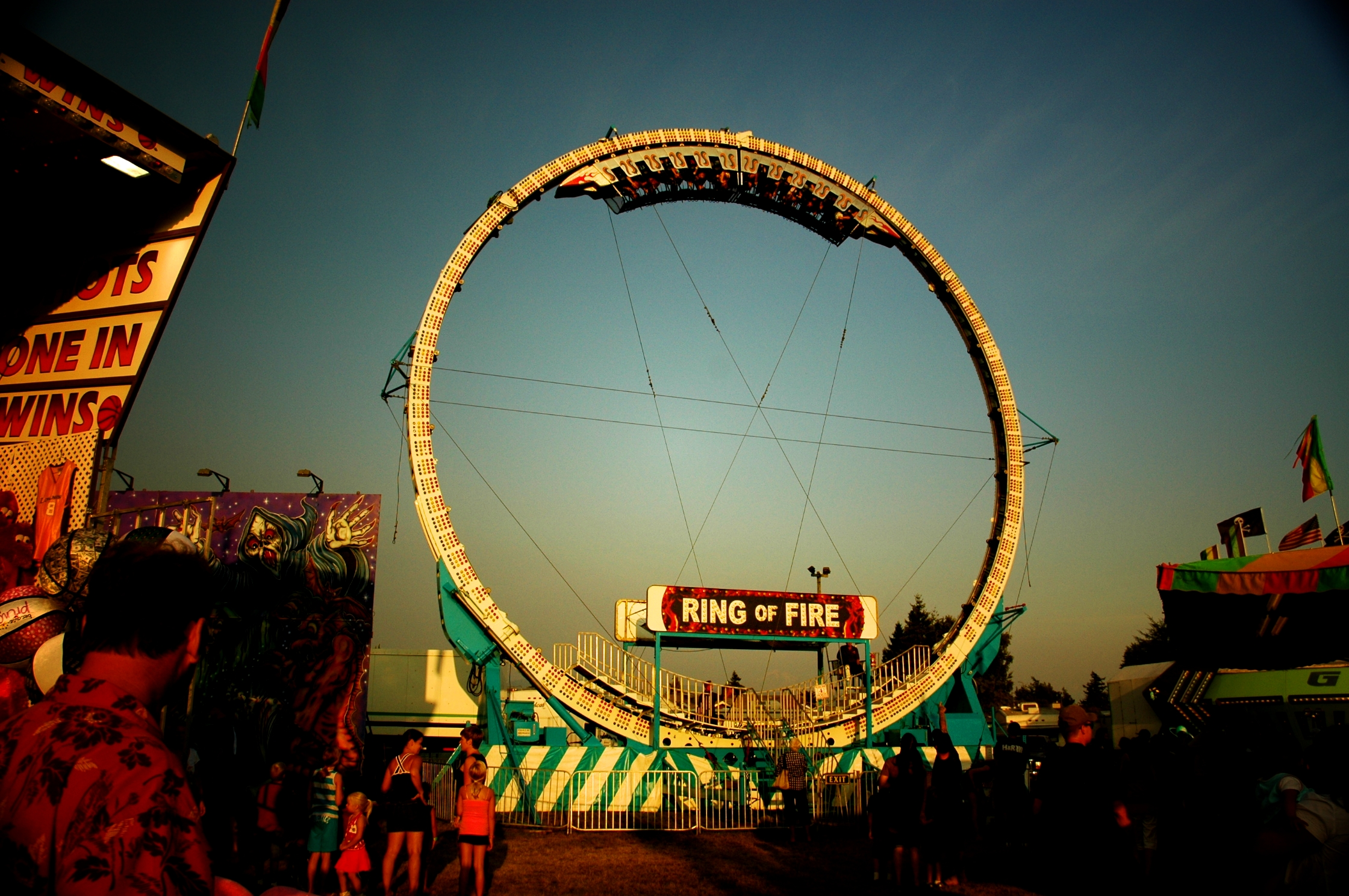
- The Ring of Fire carnival ride in 2009
- Status: Active
- Genre: County fair
- Dates: August
- Frequency: Annual
- Locations: Lynden, Washington, U.S.
- Years active: 1909–present
- Attendance: approximately 200,000 per year
- Website: nwwafair.com

The Northwest Washington Fair is an annual county fair in Whatcom County, Washington, United States. The 10 day August event has been held in Lynden since 1909 and draws approximately 200,000 visitors. The fair includes animal exhibits, agricultural displays, a carnival, and food vendors. Live entertainment ranges from a demolition derby and rodeo to musical acts at the grandstand and other performances.

The event was originally a street fair first held on October 16, 1909, by Lynden merchants. It was renamed the Nooksack Valley Produce Fair in 1910 and the Whatcom County Fair the following year. The event became known as the Northwest Washington Fair in 1923. The fair features a large display of FFA and 4-H animals as well as open-class animal exhibits. The fairgrounds include a 46,000 sq ft (4,300 m^{2}) barn showcasing swine, dairy, sheep, llamas and alpacas, beef cattle, and other animals; horse barns; poultry and rabbit barns; and a dog and cat barn.

The fair was not held from 1931 through 1933; from 1942 to 1945 due to World War II; and in 2020 due to the COVID-19 pandemic.
