= Willamette, Oregon =

Town in USA

The town of Willamette, Oregon was incorporated on October 5, 1908, and is located directly West across the Willamette River from Oregon City, Oregon and upstream from the Willamette Falls.

The area was first called Willamette Falls, but later shortened to Willamette. The first mayor of Willamette was James Downey. The town consisted of approximately 300 residents. The main business within the town limits was the Capen Shoe Company Factory, located at 7th Avenue (now known as Willamette Falls Drive) and 12th Street. Each residence had electricity, running water and a sewage disposal system. Willamette had its own electric trolley service from the Main Street into town to the Willamette Falls Railroad station located at the bridge to Oregon City. Some residents used the trolley service to travel to work at the paper mills on the west side of the Willamette River and in Oregon City.

== Typhoid outbreak ==
In 1910 and 1911, the town of Willamette was struck by a typhoid fever outbreak, first believed to be caused by the spring floods of the Willamette River which poisoned the town well at the bottom of 12th Street. Newspaper reports of the time, state that 10% of the town (35 people) were stricken with typhoid fever and at least one died. The source of the second outbreak was in question since the well had tested clean by state health officials.

== Paperwork anomaly ==
In 1912, the former mayor James Downey, sued the town of Willamette when a property tax was enforced. Downey claimed that Willamette had not filed the proper paperwork of incorporation according to Oregon law and therefore was unable to collect a tax. A judge agreed since county officials had never verified the 1908 vote of incorporation. A new vote was held in 1913, and the proper paperwork was filed.

== Annexation ==
In 1913, the town of Willamette made two unsuccessful attempts to annex its neighboring communities to the north, Sunset, Windsor, West Oregon City, and Bolton. In August 1913, these communities then merged to form the current city of West Linn.

In 1917, the much larger neighbor, West Linn, annexed Willamette into its boundary allowing Willamette access to West Linn's clean water from the nearby Clackamas River, secured through an arrangement with Oregon City.

The original area of Willamette was designated as a National Register Historic District in 2009, under the name of "Willamette Falls." The area encompasses the local historic district of Willamette, established by West Linn in the 1970s.
