= Yelkanum Seclamatan =

Chief of the Nooksack Indians

- Y'elʔqáy'nem Selh'émeten
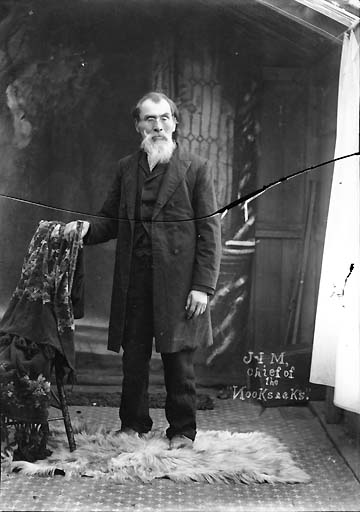

Nooksack leader

Personal details
- Born: Squahalish, Washington
- Died: Lynden, Washington
- Spouse(s): Fannie; Clara Tennant
- Relations: Nina (sister; died 1875)
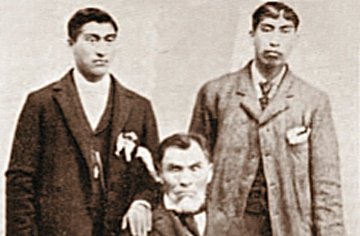
- Children
- Nickname: Lynden Jim or Indian Jim

Yelkanum Seclamatan (/jɛlˈkeɪnəm səˈklæmətən/ yel-KAY-nəm sə-KLAM-ə-tən; Nooksack: Y'elʔqáy'nem Selh'émeten [jˀəlʔˈqæjˀnəm səˈɬʼəməˌtən]; died April 1911), also known as Chief Jim, Indian Jim, Lynden Jim, or Squahalish Jim, was chief of the Nooksack Indians in the late 19th century. His first name has variously been spelled Yellakanim, Yallakanum, or Yellow Kanim, and his last name Seklameten or Seclamatum.

== Life ==
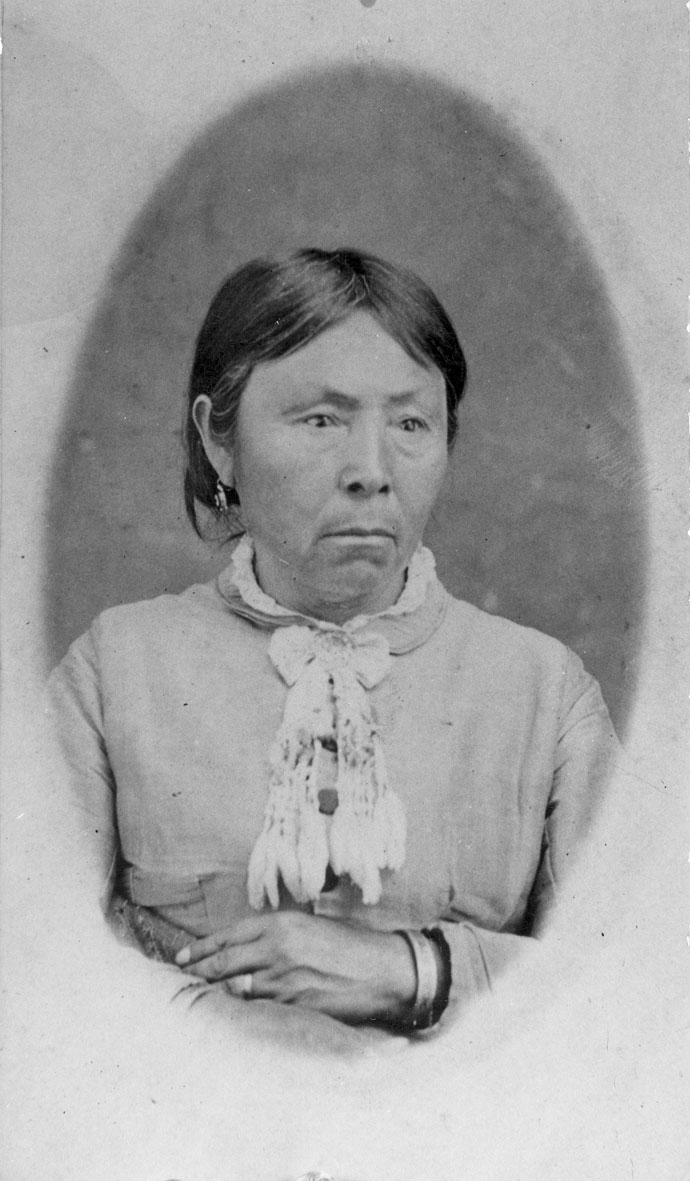
Clara Tennant, one of Yelkanum's wives

In the late 1870s, Yelkanum contributed portions of his land to be used in the construction of a Nooksack Indian Methodist School by Clara and Rev. John Tennant (after whom Tennant Lake is named). In 1893 Tennant died of a stroke, and ten years later Yelkanum married his Lummi wife Clara Tennant. However, three months after their marriage Clara died of pneumonia.

Yelkanum's death was announced in The Bellingham Herald on April 27, 1911. At the time he lived with his granddaughter Emily Williams.
