= Lynden School District =

School district in Washington, United States

Lynden School District is a public primary and secondary education school district located in Lynden, Washington. The Lynden School District operates one high school, one middle school, one parent partnership alternative learning school, and three elementary schools. The district offices occupy a portion of the Lynden High School campus but maintain an independent address at 1203 Bradley Road in Lynden.

Lynden High School enrolls approximately 890 students in ninth, tenth, eleventh, and twelfth grades. The school mascot is a lion; school colors are green and gold. The high school campus is located at 1201 Bradley Road in Lynden. It is a Washington Interscholastic Activities Association 2A school and has produced numerous state championship athletic teams. In addition to their reputation as dominating athletes, Lynden students have earned top academic accolades, including a YMCA Youth & Government Mock Trial State Championship title, numerous Washington Future Problem Solving state finals honors, and the National Make A Difference Day's top prize.

Lynden Middle School enrolls about 600 students in sixth, seventh, and eighth grades. The school mascot is a lion; school colors are green and gold. The middle school is located at 516 Main Street in Lynden, two blocks north of historic downtown Lynden. The middle school campus is home to the celebrated Judson Hall Auditorium.

Bernice Vossbeck Elementary School, educating approximately 400 students, enrolls students in kindergarten to fifth grade. The school is located at 1301 Bridgeview Drive, a half mile north of Lynden High School. Bernice Vossbeck is home to the 2010 Destination Imagination "Do or DI" state champions, and school staff have received the State of Washington Office of Superintendent of Public Instruction Classified School Employee Excellence Award.

William A. Fisher Elementary School enrolls approximately 340 students in kindergarten to fifth grade. The school is located at 501 North 14th Street in Lynden. The school is located several blocks northwest of historic downtown Lynden and is named for former Lynden School District Superintendent William A. Fisher, who held the position for over forty years, seeing students through the "Roaring 20s", the Great Depression, the Second World War, and the earlier days of the Cold War.

Isom Elementary School (formerly Elbert Isom Intermediate School) educates about 380 students in kindergarten to fifth grade. The school is located at 8461 Benson Road. In 2010, Isom was recognized by the Center for Educational Effectiveness & Phi Delta Kappa-Washington State as a School of Distinction.
