= Lynden, Washington =

City in Washington, United States

Lynden Nooksack: Squahalish
- City
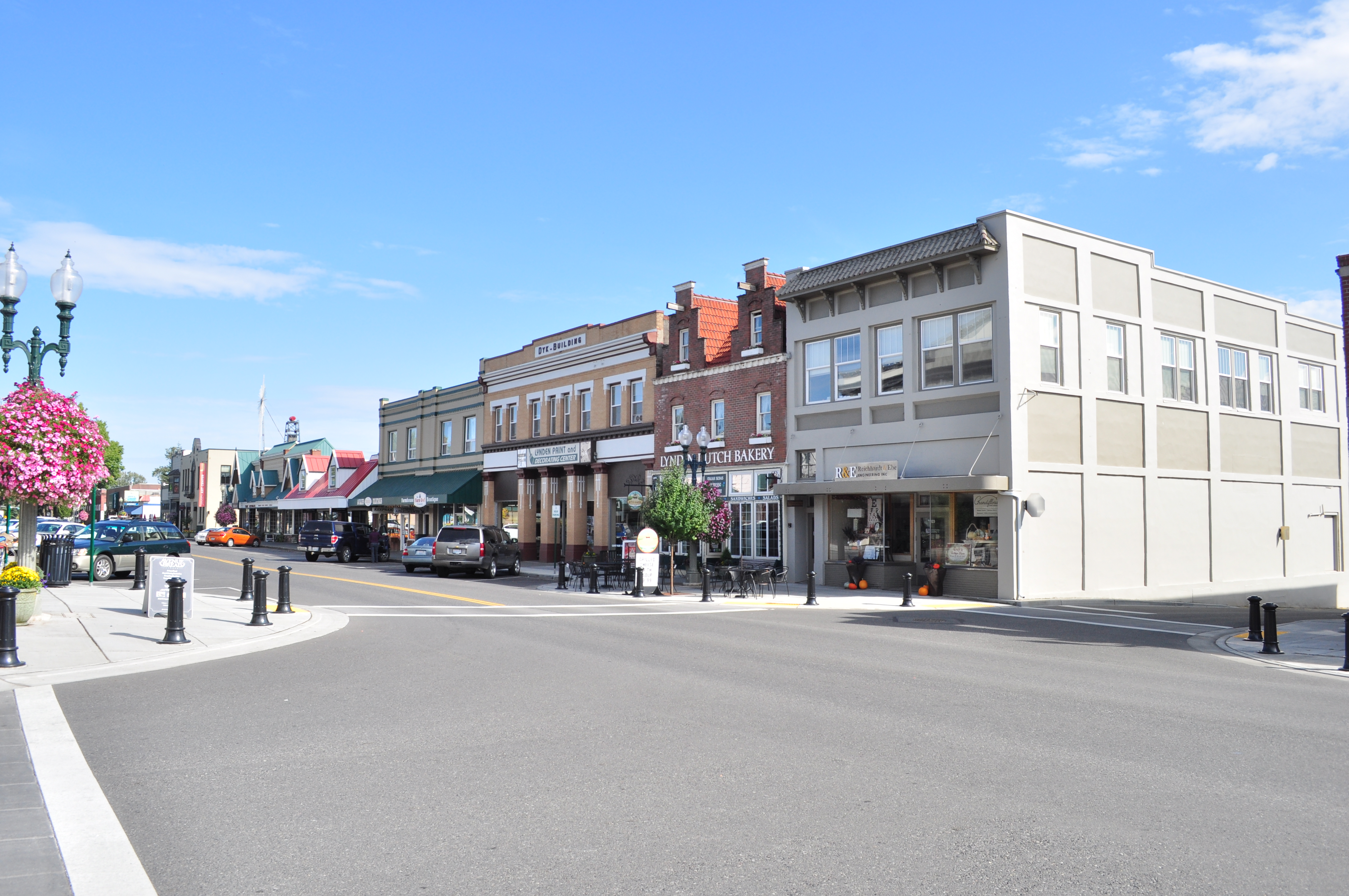
- Downtown Lynden
- Nicknames: Gem City; Queen of the Nooksack Valley
- Location of Lynden, Washington
- Coordinates: 48°56′47″N 122°28′25″W
- Country: United States
- State: Washington
- County: Whatcom

Government
  - Type: Mayor–council
  - Mayor: Scott Korthuis

Area
  - City: 5.44 sq mi (14.10 km^{2})
  - Land: 5.44 sq mi (14.08 km^{2})
  - Water: 0.012 sq mi (0.03 km^{2})
- Elevation: 102 ft (31 m)

Population (2020)
  - City: 15,749
  - Estimate (2023): 16,551
  - Density: 2,897/sq mi (1,119/km^{2})
  - Metro: 234,954 (Bellingham metropolitan area) (US: 204th)
  - Metro density: 109.4/sq mi (42.25/km^{2})
- Demonym: Lyndenite
- Time zone: UTC-8 (Pacific (PST))
  - Summer (DST): UTC-7 (PDT)
- ZIP Code: 98264
- Area code: 360, 564
- FIPS code: 53-40805
- GNIS feature ID: 2410899
- Website: lyndenwa.org

Lynden is a city in Whatcom County, Washington, United States. It is located 15 miles (24 km) north of Bellingham, the county seat and principal city of the Bellingham Metropolitan Area. It is the third largest city in Whatcom County. The city is approximately 5 miles (8.0 km) south of the Canada–U.S. border.

The city is located along the Nooksack River and State Route 539. The population of Lynden was 15,749 at the 2020 census. In 2024, it was updated to 16,551. The city is also home to the annual Northwest Washington Fair.

== History ==
In 1870, Phoebe Judson and her husband Holden founded Lynden on the lands of the indigenous Nooksack people, near a settlement called Squahalish. Judson named the post office in 1893 after the Bavarian Hohenlinden as described in Thomas Campbell's poem "Hohenlinden", a town on a hillside by a river with a view of a mountain, because Lynden fit this description. According to her book A Pioneer's Search for an Ideal Home, Judson changed the spelling of "Linden" to be more visually appealing. Lynden was officially incorporated as a city on March 16, 1891. A statue of Judson at the intersection of Front and 6th Street was dedicated in 2017.

The city lies in a broad valley formed by the Nooksack River, which empties into nearby Bellingham Bay. The valley's forests were logged in the 1870s by the first wave of American settlers, and the clearing of log jams on the Nooksack River at the end of the decade opened more land to farming. The first road connecting to Whatcom (now Bellingham) was completed in 1875 and railroads reached Lynden a decade later. The region's raspberry, strawberry, and blueberry farms emerged after World War I alongside the dairy and poultry industries.

The region saw significant Dutch immigration in the early and mid-20th century and the establishment of Calvinist churches and Dutch language schools. The city began promoting its Dutch heritage in the 1980s, including the springtime Holland Days festival and a Sinterklaas celebration in December. Several buildings along Front Street were renovated with Dutch designs and businesses were renamed to match with "Dutch" names and products. Lynden retained its Dutch churches—numbering 28 by 1995—and many businesses voluntarily closed their stores on Sundays. By 2010, the city's population had grown to nearly 12,000 and 30 percent of Lynden residents claimed Dutch ancestry.

In 2005, a drug smuggling tunnel was discovered in Lynden, built by a band of Canadian smugglers in the basement of a residence 5 miles (8.0 km) north of Lynden along the Canada–U.S. border. At the time, this was the only known drug tunnel along the border.

The first time that a presumptive presidential nominee of a U.S. major political party came to Lynden during a general election year was in May 2016, when Donald Trump visited the city. The rally was originally planned to take place at Boeing Field in Seattle, but was relocated to Lynden after the permits were allegedly denied. The rally drew "thousands" of people and protestors outside of the venue; over $129,000 in extra policing and security costs were attributed to the event.

== Geography ==
The Nooksack River runs along a short portion of the city's southern border.

According to the United States Census Bureau, the city has a total area of 5.18 square miles (13.42 km^{2}), of which 5.17 square miles (13.39 km^{2}) is land and 0.01 square miles (0.03 km^{2}) is water.

=== Climate ===
Lynden has a warm-summer Mediterranean climate (Köppen Csb) typical of the Pacific Northwest that is characterized by warm (but not hot) dry summers, and mild to chilly rainy winters. In Lynden's case, the climate is moderated by the proximity to the Pacific Ocean, with small temperature variations on average throughout the year, resulting in mild year-round temperatures, although winter months can get quite cool. Average high temperatures range from 44.6 °F (7.0 °C) in January to 73.6 °F (23.1 °C) in August. Lynden, on average, has very wet winters and dry summers, also representative of the region.

Climate data for Lynden, WA
Month	Jan	Feb	Mar	Apr	May	Jun	Jul	Aug	Sep	Oct	Nov	Dec	Year
Record high °F (°C)	59.0 (15.0)	64.0 (17.8)	63.0 (17.2)	75.0 (23.9)	86.0 (30.0)	106.0 (41.1)	88.0 (31.1)	88.0 (31.1)	84.0 (28.9)	74.0 (23.3)	63.0 (17.2)	57.0 (13.9)	106.0 (41.1)
Mean daily maximum °F (°C)	44.6 (7.0)	48.1 (8.9)	52.6 (11.4)	58.0 (14.4)	63.9 (17.7)	68.7 (20.4)	73.2 (22.9)	73.6 (23.1)	68.3 (20.2)	58.2 (14.6)	49.1 (9.5)	43.3 (6.3)	58.5 (14.7)
Daily mean °F (°C)	39.2 (4.0)	41.2 (5.1)	45.0 (7.2)	49.5 (9.7)	55.1 (12.8)	59.9 (15.5)	63.4 (17.4)	63.4 (17.4)	58.3 (14.6)	50.5 (10.3)	43.3 (6.3)	38.1 (3.4)	50.6 (10.3)
Mean daily minimum °F (°C)	33.7 (0.9)	34.3 (1.3)	37.3 (2.9)	40.9 (4.9)	46.2 (7.9)	51.0 (10.6)	53.6 (12.0)	53.1 (11.7)	48.2 (9.0)	42.7 (5.9)	37.5 (3.1)	32.9 (0.5)	42.6 (5.9)
Record low °F (°C)	10.0 (−12.2)	12.0 (−11.1)	19.0 (−7.2)	28.0 (−2.2)	37.0 (2.8)	39.0 (3.9)	41.0 (5.0)	44.0 (6.7)	39.0 (3.9)	21.0 (−6.1)	7.0 (−13.9)	7.0 (−13.9)	7.0 (−13.9)
Average precipitation inches (mm)	5.5 (140)	3.4 (86)	3.8 (97)	3.1 (79)	2.9 (74)	2.2 (56)	1.4 (36)	1.4 (36)	2.2 (56)	4.2 (110)	6.4 (160)	5.0 (130)	41.5 (1,060)
Average snowfall inches (cm)	2.7 (6.9)	1.8 (4.6)	0.6 (1.5)	0 (0)	0 (0)	0 (0)	0 (0)	0 (0)	0 (0)	0.1 (0.25)	0.9 (2.3)	2.8 (7.1)	8.9 (22.65)
Average precipitation days	18	14	17	15	23	11	6	6	9	15	20	18	172
Average snowy days	1.6	1.1	0.5	0	0	0	0	0	0	0	0.4	1.4	5

== Demographics ==
Historical population
Census	Pop.	Note	%±
1890	560		—
1900	365		−34.8%
1910	1,148		214.5%
1920	1,244		8.4%
1930	1,564		25.7%
1940	1,696		8.4%
1950	2,161		27.4%
1960	2,542		17.6%
1970	2,808		10.5%
1980	4,022		43.2%
1990	5,709		41.9%
2000	9,020		58.0%
2010	11,951		32.5%
2020	15,749		31.8%
2023 (est.)	16,551		5.1%
U.S. Decennial Census

=== 2020 census ===
As of the 2020 census, Lynden had a population of 15,749. The median age was 37.7 years; 26.7% of residents were under the age of 18 and 20.6% of residents were 65 years of age or older. For every 100 females there were 91.1 males, and for every 100 females age 18 and over there were 87.4 males age 18 and over.

99.4% of residents lived in urban areas, while 0.6% lived in rural areas.

There were 5,890 households in Lynden, of which 35.5% had children under the age of 18 living in them. Of all households, 58.6% were married-couple households, 11.8% were households with a male householder and no spouse or partner present, and 25.9% were households with a female householder and no spouse or partner present. About 25.8% of all households were made up of individuals and 16.0% had someone living alone who was 65 years of age or older.

There were 6,156 housing units, of which 4.3% were vacant. The homeowner vacancy rate was 1.9% and the rental vacancy rate was 3.2%.

The most reported ancestries were:

- Dutch (19.6%)
- English (18.6%)
- German (16.2%)
- Irish (10.9%)
- Mexican (9.4%)
- Scottish (4.2%)
- Norwegian (4%)
- Italian (2.7%)
- French (2.4%)
- Swedish (2.4%)

Racial composition as of the 2020 census
Race	Number	Percent
White	12,787	81.2%
Black or African American	139	0.9%
American Indian and Alaska Native	89	0.6%
Asian	564	3.6%
Native Hawaiian and Other Pacific Islander	42	0.3%
Some other race	784	5.0%
Two or more races	1,344	8.5%
Hispanic or Latino (of any race)	1,898	12.1%

=== 2010 census ===
As of the 2010 census, there were 11,951 people, 4,594 households, and 3,248 families residing in the city. The population density was 2,311.6 inhabitants per square mile (892.5/km^{2}). There were 4,812 housing units at an average density of 930.8 per square mile (359.4/km^{2}). The racial makeup of the city was 89.7% White, 0.7% African American, 0.9% Native American, 2.5% Asian, 0.2% Pacific Islander, 4.0% from other races, and 2.1% from two or more races. Hispanic or Latino of any race were 8.7% of the population.

There were 4,594 households, of which 32.7% had children under the age of 18 living with them, 60.1% were married couples living together, 8.1% had a female householder with no husband present, 2.6% had a male householder with no wife present, and 29.3% were non-families. 26.5% of all households were made up of individuals, and 15.8% had someone living alone who was 65 years of age or older. The average household size was 2.57 and the average family size was 3.11.

The median age in the city was 38.6 years. 26.4% of residents were under the age of 18; 7.6% were between the ages of 18 and 24; 23.5% were from 25 to 44; 22.8% were from 45 to 64; and 19.6% were 65 years of age or older. The gender makeup of the city was 46.8% male and 53.2% female.

=== 2000 census ===
As of the 2000 census, there were 9,020 people, 3,426 households, and 2,500 families residing in the city. The population density was 2,208.8 people per square mile (853.6/km^{2}). There were 3,592 housing units at an average density of 879.6 per square mile (339.9/km^{2}). The racial makeup of the city was 93.07% White, 0.27% African American, 0.45% Native American, 2.26% Asian, 2.51% from other races, and 1.44% from two or more races. Hispanic or Latino of any race were 4.73% of the population.

There were 3,426 households, out of which 34.5% had children under the age of 18 living with them, 62.8% were married couples living together, 7.9% had a female householder with no husband present, and 27.0% were non-families. 24.8% of all households were made up of individuals, and 15.3% had someone living alone who was 65 years of age or older. The average household size was 2.60 and the average family size was 3.11.

In the city, the age distribution of the population shows 28.2% under the age of 18, 8.0% from 18 to 24, 25.5% from 25 to 44, 19.0% from 45 to 64, and 19.3% who were 65 years of age or older. The median age was 37 years. For every 100 females, there were 89.7 males. For every 100 females ages 18 and over, there were 84.7 males.

The median income for a household in the city was $42,767, and the median income for a family was $50,449. Males had a median income of $39,597 versus $23,292 for females. The per capita income for the city was $20,639. About 4.1% of families and 6.1% of the population were below the poverty line, including 4.5% of those under age 18 and 12.7% of those age 65 or over.

== Arts and culture ==
The Lynden Heritage Museum was established in 1976 by George Young and has over 20,000 items and rotating exhibits. It was originally known as the Lynden Pioneer Museum until the museum was renamed in 2023 to reflect its mission to cover more than just the "pioneer era" of the city's history.

=== Events ===
The Northwest Raspberry Festival is held annually during the third weekend in July. The festival includes a street fair, basketball tournament, car show, fun run, rock climbing wall, tours of raspberry fields and wineries, and a day-long ice cream social. Other annual events in Lynden include the Farmer's Day Parade in July and the Sinterklaas/Lighted Christmas Parade in December.

In August, the annual Northwest Washington Fair draws over 200,000 people and serves as the regional fair for Whatcom County. It includes agricultural display, art and crafts, live entertainment, and vendors. The fair was founded in 1909.

=== Performing arts and music ===
The Claire Theatre in downtown Lynden was established in 1987 and hosts multiple community theater performances each year. The Lynden Music Festival has hosted musical performances at events throughout the year since 2009. Performances are often held in local businesses and churches.

=== Religion ===
The city is noted for its abundance of churches. At one time, some people in Lynden claimed to hold the world record for most churches per square mile and per capita, although that is unsubstantiated. Due to the town's large population of those who attend or are members of Lynden's many churches, the town has had a long tradition of most businesses closing on Sunday. In recent years, businesses have started to open on Sundays, as in other communities; a 41 year old law prohibiting Sunday alcohol sales was repealed on October 20, 2008, due to a shift in public opinion.

== Education ==
The city is served by the Lynden School District.

== Media ==
The Lynden Tribune is a weekly newspaper published in Lynden since 1908. It was the successor to the defunct Lynden Sun-Pilot, which formed in 1905. The Lewis family has owned and operated the paper since 1914. The family business ran its own printing press until it was shuttered in 2025.

== Infrastructure ==
=== Transportation ===
Lynden is served by two state highways: State Route 539, which travels north to the Canadian border and south to Bellingham; and State Route 546, which travels east towards Sumas. The Whatcom Transportation Authority provides bus service between Lynden and Cordata Station in Bellingham. The city is also connected via a short branch of the BNSF Railway system, traveling east to a junction with the Sumas Subdivision.

The city is home to Lynden Municipal Airport (Jansen Field), located between Benson and Depot roads, with private residences connected to the taxiways. The Port of Bellingham proposed a takeover of the airport in the early 1980s to support local cropdusting operations, but abandoned their plans due to its proximity to the town, which disqualified it from receiving federal matching funds for improvements.

== Notable people ==
- Catherine Burns, actress and screenwriter
- Sterling Dietz, magician
- Daulton Hommes, basketball player
- Phoebe Judson, the founder of Lynden
- Ricardo S. Martinez, U.S. District Court Judge
- Ray Pixley, racing driver
- Yelkanum Seclamatan, Nooksack chief
- Ty Taubenheim, baseball player
- Gordon Wright, historian

== Sister city ==
Lynden has one sister city relationship with the municipal governments of the City of Langley and Township of Langley in British Columbia. Both communities, located across the Canada–U.S. border from Lynden, signed agreements with Lynden in 1986 ahead of Expo 86 in Vancouver.
