= Lower Mainland =

Region of British Columbia, Canada

- Region
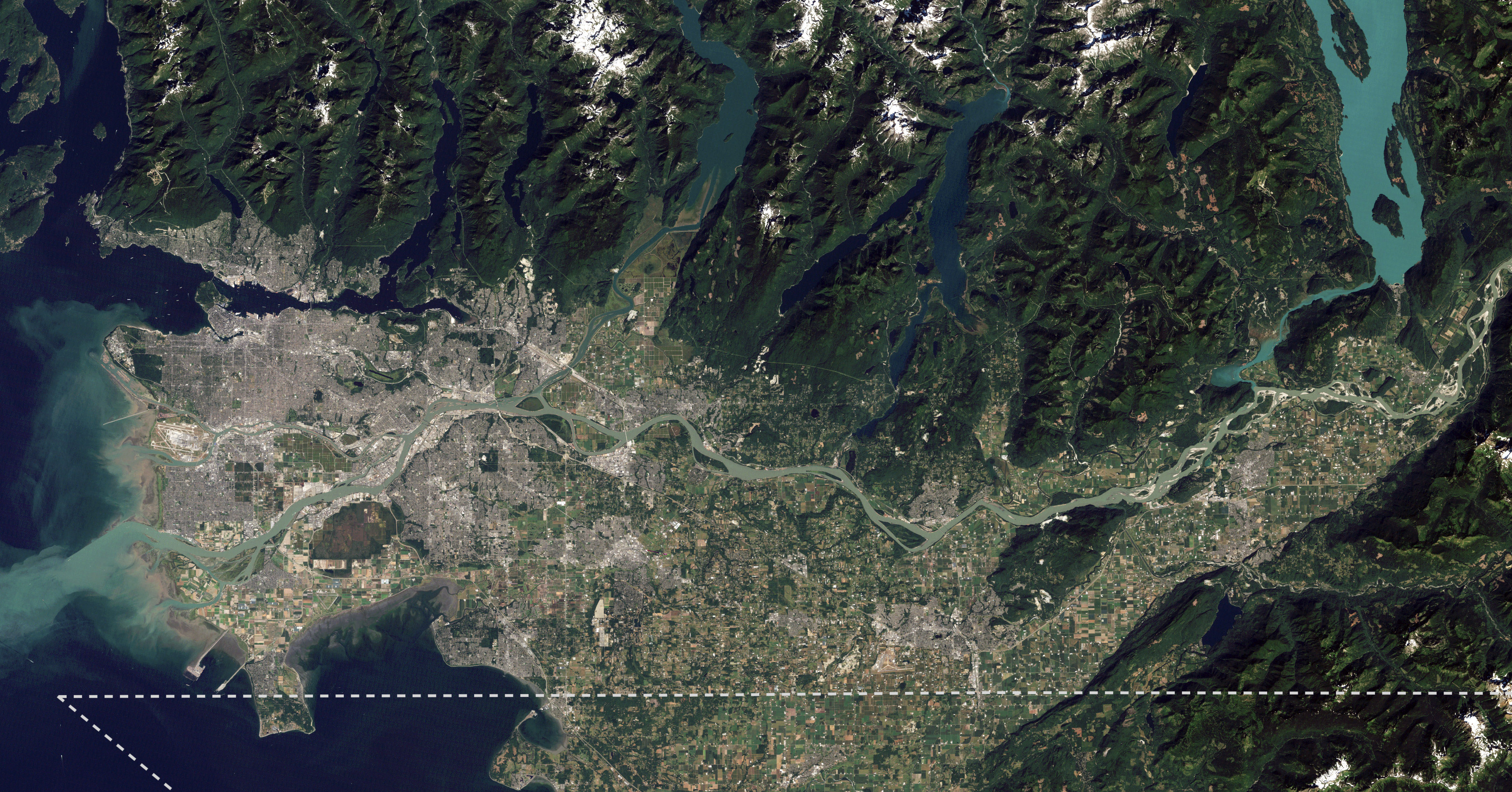
- Core area of the Lower Mainland
- Coordinates: 49°05′00″N 122°21′00″W
- Country: Canada
- Province: British Columbia
- Region: British Columbia Coast

Area
  - Total: 36,303.31 km^{2} (14,016.79 sq mi)
  - Extended area: 31,368.24 km^{2} (12,111.35 sq mi)
  - Core area: 4,935.07 km^{2} (1,905.44 sq mi)

Population (2021)
  - Total: 3,049,496 (Note: Total population of the Lower Mainland Economic Region, which includes the Metro Vancouver Regional District, Fraser Valley Regional District, Squamish-Lillooet Regional District, and Sunshine Coast Regional District.)
  - Density: 84.1/km^{2} (218/sq mi)
  - Core area: 2,924,685 (Note: Combined population of the Metro Vancouver Regional District and the Fraser Valley Regional District)
  - Extended area: 124,811
- Time zone: UTC−07:00 (Pacific Time)
- Postal code prefixes: V
- Area codes: 236, 257, 604, 672, 778

The Lower Mainland is a geographic and cultural region of the mainland coast of the Canadian province of British Columbia that generally comprises the regional districts of Metro Vancouver and the Fraser Valley. Home to approximately 3.05 million people as of the 2021 Canadian census, the Lower Mainland contains sixteen of the province's 30 most populous municipalities and approximately 60% of the province's total population.

The region was historically occupied by the Sto:lo, a Halkomelem-speaking people of the Coast Salish linguistic and cultural grouping.

== Boundaries ==
Although the term Lower Mainland has been used from the earliest period of European colonization in British Columbia, it has never been officially defined in legal terms. The term has historically been in popular usage for over a century to describe a region that extends from Horseshoe Bay south to the Canada–United States border and east to Hope at the eastern end of the Fraser Valley. This definition makes the term Lower Mainland almost synonymous with the regional districts of Metro Vancouver and Fraser Valley.

However, the British Columbia Geographical Names Information System (BCGNIS) comments that most residents of Vancouver might consider it to be only areas west of Mission and Abbotsford, while residents in the rest of the province consider it to be the Sea-to-Sky Corridor south of Whistler and west of Hope.

== Geography ==
The region is bounded to the north by the Pacific Ranges and to the southeast by the Cascade Mountains, and is traversed from east to west by the Fraser River. Due to its consistency of climate, flora and fauna, geology and land use, "Lower Mainland" is also the name of an ecoregion—a biogeoclimatic region—that comprises the eastern part of the Georgia Depression and extends from Powell River on the Sunshine Coast to Hope at the eastern end of the Fraser Valley.

=== Climate ===
One of the mildest climates in Canada, the region has a mean annual temperature of 9 °C (48 °F) with a summer mean of 15 °C (59 °F) and a winter mean of 3.5 °C (38.3 °F). Annual precipitation ranges from an annual mean of 850 millimetres (33 in) in the west end to 2,000 millimetres (79 in) in the eastern end of the Fraser Valley and at higher elevations. Maximum precipitation occurs as rain in winter. Less than ten percent falls as snow at sea level but the amount of snowfall increases significantly with elevation.

== Demographics ==
Core area population history
Year	Pop.	±%
1971	1,121,018	—
1981	1,309,560	+16.8%
1986	1,491,580	+13.9%
1991	1,733,761	+16.2%
1996	2,054,062	+18.5%
2001	2,224,515	+8.3%
2006	2,373,612	+6.7%
2011	2,590,921	+9.2%
2016	2,759,365	+6.5%
2021	2,966,830	+7.5%
Source: Statistics Canada

=== Population ===
As of the 2021 census, the population of the Lower Mainland core area totals 2,966,830:

- 2,642,825 in Metro Vancouver Regional District
- 324,005 in the Fraser Valley Regional District

These figures are slightly inflated due to the inclusion of areas within the regional districts which are not normally considered to be part of the Lower Mainland, notably the lower Fraser Canyon and the heads of Harrison and Pitt Lakes, which are within the FVRD, and Lions Bay and Bowen Island, which are within the Metro Vancouver Regional District.

=== Ethnicity ===
Panethnic breakdown of the Lower Mainland (2021 census)
1. European (Note: Statistic includes all persons that did not make up part of a visible minority or an indigenous identity.) (45.7%)
2. East Asian (Note: Statistic includes total responses of "Chinese", "Korean", and "Japanese" under visible minority section on census.) (21.0%)
3. South Asian (14.5%)
4. Southeast Asian (Note: Statistic includes total responses of "Filipino" and "Southeast Asian" under visible minority section on census.) (7.09%)
5. Middle Eastern (Note: Statistic includes total responses of "West Asian" and "Arab" under visible minority section on census.) (3.05%)
6. Indigenous (2.99%)
7. Latin American (1.86%)
8. African (1.53%)
9. Other (Note: Statistic includes total responses of "Visible minority, n.i.e." and "Multiple visible minorities" under visible minority section on census.) (2.32%)

The Lower Mainland is among the most multicultural and diverse regions in Canada.

As of 2021, Europeans form a plurality with 1,337,105 persons or 45.7 percent of the total population, followed by East Asians with 614,860 persons or 21.0 percent and South Asians with 422,880 persons or 14.5 percent.

Panethnic groups in the Lower Mainland (2001−2021)
Panethnic group	2021		2016		2011		2006		2001	
Panethnic group	Pop.	%	Pop.	%	Pop.	%	Pop.	%	Pop.	%
European	1,337,105	45.72%	1,387,125	51.09%	1,403,525	54.99%	1,381,770	58.75%	1,397,990	63.51%
East Asian	614,860	21.02%	564,445	20.79%	494,130	19.36%	458,165	19.48%	399,785	18.16%
South Asian	422,880	14.46%	330,925	12.19%	285,780	11.2%	233,530	9.93%	183,660	8.34%
Southeast Asian	207,420	7.09%	173,060	6.37%	159,430	6.25%	115,185	4.9%	88,000	4%
Middle Eastern	89,135	3.05%	63,300	2.33%	49,505	1.94%	36,085	1.53%	27,595	1.25%
Indigenous	87,355	2.99%	83,660	3.08%	70,915	2.78%	54,845	2.33%	48,380	2.2%
Latin American	54,545	1.86%	36,855	1.36%	30,510	1.2%	24,480	1.04%	20,040	0.91%
African	44,700	1.53%	32,325	1.19%	25,385	0.99%	21,945	0.93%	19,320	0.88%
Other/multiracial	67,755	2.32%	43,295	1.59%	33,165	1.3%	25,815	1.1%	16,565	0.75%
Total responses	2,924,685	98.58%	2,715,000	98.39%	2,552,350	98.51%	2,351,805	99.08%	2,201,330	98.96%
Total population	2,966,830	100%	2,759,365	100%	2,590,921	100%	2,373,612	100%	2,224,515	100%
Note: Totals greater than 100% due to multiple origin responses.

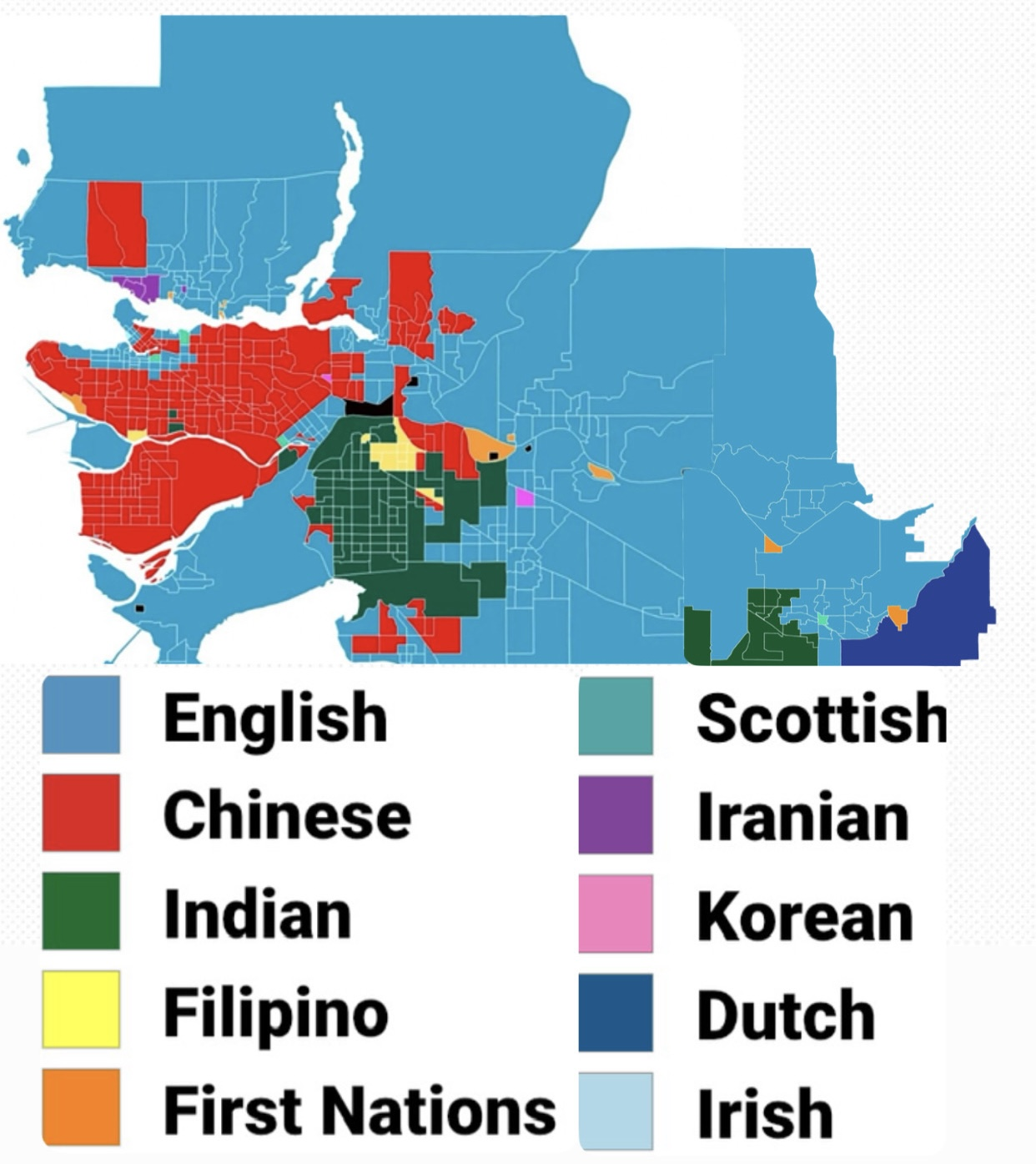
Largest ethnic origin by census tract, 2021 census

=== Religion ===
Religion in the Lower Mainland (2021)
1. Irreligious (46.6%)
2. Christian (33.8%)
3. Sikh (9.09%)
4. Muslim (3.89%)
5. Buddhist (2.48%)
6. Hindu (2.43%)
7. Jewish (0.70%)
8. Other (1.02%)

The Lower Mainland includes large irreligious, Christian, and Sikh communities. The Sikh population, numbering over 265,000 persons or 9.1 percent of the total population is statistically significant across Metro Vancouver and the Fraser Valley; proportionally, it is more than four times the national average of 2.1 percent.

Religious groups in the Lower Mainland (2001−2021)
Religious group	2021		2011		2001	
Religious group	Pop.	%	Pop.	%	Pop.	%
Irreligion	1,361,800	46.56%	1,042,815	40.86%	758,130	34.44%
Christianity	989,105	33.82%	1,088,160	42.63%	1,138,505	51.72%
Sikhism	265,870	9.09%	184,810	7.24%	116,110	5.27%
Islam	113,880	3.89%	74,320	2.91%	53,225	2.42%
Buddhism	72,595	2.48%	79,680	3.12%	76,140	3.46%
Hinduism	71,210	2.43%	42,205	1.65%	28,440	1.29%
Judaism	20,430	0.7%	19,125	0.75%	17,555	0.8%
Indigenous spirituality	2,895	0.1%	2,590	0.1%	2,225	0.1%
Other	26,900	0.92%	18,640	0.73%	11,015	0.5%
Total responses	2,924,685	98.58%	2,552,350	98.51%	2,201,325	98.96%
Total population	2,966,830	100%	2,590,921	100%	2,224,515	100%

=== Language ===
Knowledge of language (2016−2021)
Language	2021		2016	
Language	Pop.	%	Pop.	%
English	2,772,150	94.78%	2,569,215	94.63%
Mandarin	295,400	10.1%	252,260	9.29%
Punjabi	286,270	9.79%	223,510	8.23%
Cantonese	235,220	8.04%	224,655	8.27%
French	185,330	6.34%	185,420	6.83%
Tagalog	113,205	3.87%	98,395	3.62%
Hindi	119,435	4.08%	75,125	2.77%
Spanish	100,355	3.43%	79,885	2.94%
Korean	63,335	2.17%	52,650	1.94%
German	43,490	1.49%	47,825	1.76%
Total responses	2,924,680	98.58%	2,714,995	98.39%
Total population	2,966,830	100%	2,759,365	100%

Mother tongue (2016−2021)
Language	2021		2016	
Language	Pop.	%	Pop.	%
English	1,576,995	53.65%	1,537,875	56.31%
Punjabi	219,015	7.45%	182,050	6.67%
Mandarin	193,190	6.57%	176,435	6.46%
Cantonese	183,860	6.25%	185,135	6.78%
Tagalog	69,895	2.38%	68,240	2.5%
Persian	54,985	1.87%	41,645	1.52%
Korean	54,385	1.85%	47,715	1.75%
Spanish	49,255	1.68%	38,705	1.42%
French	27,280	0.93%	27,820	1.02%
German	24,795	0.84%	32,210	1.18%
Total responses	2,939,500	99.08%	2,731,255	98.98%
Total population	2,966,830	100%	2,759,365	100%

== Regional districts ==
Regional districts were first created across British Columbia from 1966 to 1967 to form bodies for inter-municipal coordination and to extend municipal-level powers to areas outside existing municipalities. Today, the Lower Mainland includes two regional districts: the Metro Vancouver Regional District (MVRD) and the Fraser Valley Regional District (FVRD). Both regional districts, however, include areas outside the traditional limits of the Lower Mainland. Metro Vancouver includes areas like Surrey and Langley that are geographically in the Fraser Valley.

The Metro Vancouver Regional District includes 21 municipalities. The MVRD is bordered on the west by the Strait of Georgia, to the north by the Squamish-Lillooet Regional District, on the east by the Fraser Valley Regional District, and to the south by Whatcom County, Washington, in the United States.

The Fraser Valley Regional District lies east of the Metro Vancouver Regional District, and comprises the cities of Abbotsford and Chilliwack, the district municipalities of Mission, Kent, and Hope, and the village of Harrison Hot Springs. It also includes many unincorporated areas in the Fraser Valley and along the west side of the Fraser Canyon (the Fraser Canyon is not in the Lower Mainland).

Regional district powers are very limited and other localized provincial government services are delivered through other regionalization systems.

== Indigenous territories ==
The region was historically occupied by the Musqueam and Tsleil'waututh, and the southern portion was historically occupied by the Squamish. Its claims overlap those of the Tsleil-waututh, Musqueam, and Kwikwetlem. Other peoples who historically occupied the region are the Sto:lo, Chehalis, Katzie, Kwantlen, Tsawwassen, and Semiahmoo; many of their territories overlap with those of the Musqueam, and with each other. Many other peoples of the Georgia Strait region also frequented the lower Fraser, including those from Vancouver Island and what is now Whatcom County, Washington. Sto:lo "traditional territory", known as Solh Temexw in Halkomelem, roughly coincides with the Lower Mainland, except for the inclusion of Port Douglas at the head of Harrison Lake, which is in In-SHUCK-ch territory, and the lands around Burrard Inlet.

== Health regions ==
The Ministry of Health provides health services in the Lower Mainland through the Provincial Health Services Authority, two regional health authorities, and the First Nations Health Authority. The Provincial Health Services Authority is in charge of specialized health services. Of the two regional health authorities, Vancouver Coastal Health serves Vancouver, Richmond, the North Shore, and the mainland coast as far north as the Central Coast region, while Fraser Health serves the area of the Lower Mainland east of Vancouver and Richmond.

== Natural threats ==
=== Flooding ===
The Lower Mainland is considered to have a high vulnerability to flood risk. There have been two major region-wide floods in 1894 and 1948, both associated with an extreme spring freshet of the Fraser River. Other major floods in the Lower Mainland – including June 1972, November 1990, and November 2021 – have been more localized, primarily impacting areas in the Fraser Valley like the Sumas Prairie, with comparatively minor impacts to Metro Vancouver. Prior to the 2021 flood, according to the Fraser Basin Council, scientists predicted a one-in-three chance of a similar-sized flood occurring in the next 50 years.

In the second quarter of 2007, the Lower Mainland was on high alert for flooding. Higher than normal snow packs in the British Columbia Interior prompted municipal governments to start taking emergency measures in the region. Dikes along the Fraser River are regulated to handle approximately 8.5 metres (28 ft) at the Mission Gauge (the height above sea level of the dykes at Mission). Warmer than normal weather in the province's Interior region caused large amounts of snow to melt prematurely, resulting in higher-than-normal water levels, which, nevertheless, remained well below flood levels.

Flooding can cover much of the Lower Mainland. Cloverdale, Barnston Island, low-lying areas of Maple Ridge, areas west of Hope, White Rock, Richmond, parts of Vancouver, and parts of Surrey are potentially at risk. In 2007, the Lower Mainland was largely spared, although northern regions of the province, along the Skeena and Nechako Rivers, experienced floods. Climate scientists predict that increasing temperatures will mean wetter winters and more snow at the high elevations. This will increase the likelihood of snowmelt floods.

The provincial government maintains an integrated flood hazard management program and extensive flood protection infrastructure in the Lower Mainland. The infrastructure consists of dikes, pump stations, floodboxes, riprap, and relief wells.

=== Earthquakes ===
While earthquakes are common in British Columbia and adjacent coastal waters, most are minor in energy release or are sufficiently remote to have little effect on populated areas. Nevertheless, earthquakes with a magnitude of up to 7.3 have occurred within 150 kilometres (93 mi) of the Lower Mainland.

Based on geological evidence, however, stronger earthquakes appear to have occurred at approximately 600-year intervals. Therefore, there is a probability that there will be a major earthquake in the region within the next 200 years.

In April 2008, the United States Geological Survey released information concerning a newly found fault south of downtown Abbotsford, called the Boulder Creek Fault. Scientists now believe this fault is active and capable of producing earthquakes in the 6.8 magnitude range.

=== Volcanoes ===
Much of the Lower Mainland is vulnerable to explosive eruptions from the Garibaldi Volcanic Belt. Volcanoes in this zone are capable of producing large quantities of volcanic ash that may cause short and long term water supply problems for Lower Mainland communities. All airports covered by the accompanying eruption column would be closed, heavy ash falls would damage electrical equipment and weak structures could collapse under the weight of the ash.

== Communities ==
The Lower Mainland's communities includes large cities in Metro Vancouver, and smaller cities, towns and villages along both banks of the Fraser River. Neighbourhoods within cities are not listed unless historically or otherwise notable and/or separate. Only some of the many Indian Reserves are listed.

=== Upper Fraser Valley ===
- Agassiz
- Bridal Falls
- Chehalis
- Greendale
- Lake Errock
- Kent
- Harrison Hot Springs
- Harrison Mills
- Hope
- Flood
- Laidlaw
- Popkum
- Rosedale
- Ruby Creek

=== Central Fraser Valley ===
- Abbotsford
- Bradner
- Chilliwack
- Clayburn
- Clearbrook
- Cultus Lake
- Deroche
- Dewdney
- Durieu
- Hatzic
- Huntingdon
- Mission
- Mount Lehman
- Nicomen Island
- Ruskin
- Sardis
- Silverdale
- Silverhill
- Stave Falls
- Steelhead
- Yarrow

=== Metro Vancouver ===
- Albion
- Aldergrove
- Anmore
- Annieville
- Barnston Island
- Belcarra
- Boundary Bay
- Bridgeport
- Brighouse
- Burnaby
- Burquitlam
- Cloverdale
- Coquitlam
- Crescent Beach
- Derby ("Old Derby")
- Douglas
- Delta
- Fort Langley
- Haney
- Kanaka Creek
- Langley City
- Langley District
- Lions Bay
- Maillardville
- Maple Ridge
- New Westminster
- Newton
- North Vancouver City
- North Vancouver District
- Pitt Meadows
- Port Coquitlam
- Port Hammond (Hammond)
- Port Kells
- Port Moody
- Queensborough
- Richmond
- Sapperton
- Sea Island
- Scottsdale
- Steveston
- Surrey
- Tsawwassen (neighbourhood)
- Tsawwassen First Nation
- UBC Vancouver
- University Endowment Lands
- Vancouver
- West Vancouver
- Whalley
- White Rock
- Whonnock
- Yennadon

== See also ==
- Fraser Lowland
- List of provincial parks of the Lower Mainland
