= Mills Lake =

Mills Lake may refer to:

- Mills Lake (California)
- Mills Lake (Minnesota)
- Mills Lake, Western Australia

== See also ==
- Mill Lake (disambiguation)
