= Coat of arms of Abbotsford, British Columbia =

Heraldic emblem of the city

Coat of Arms of Abbotsford
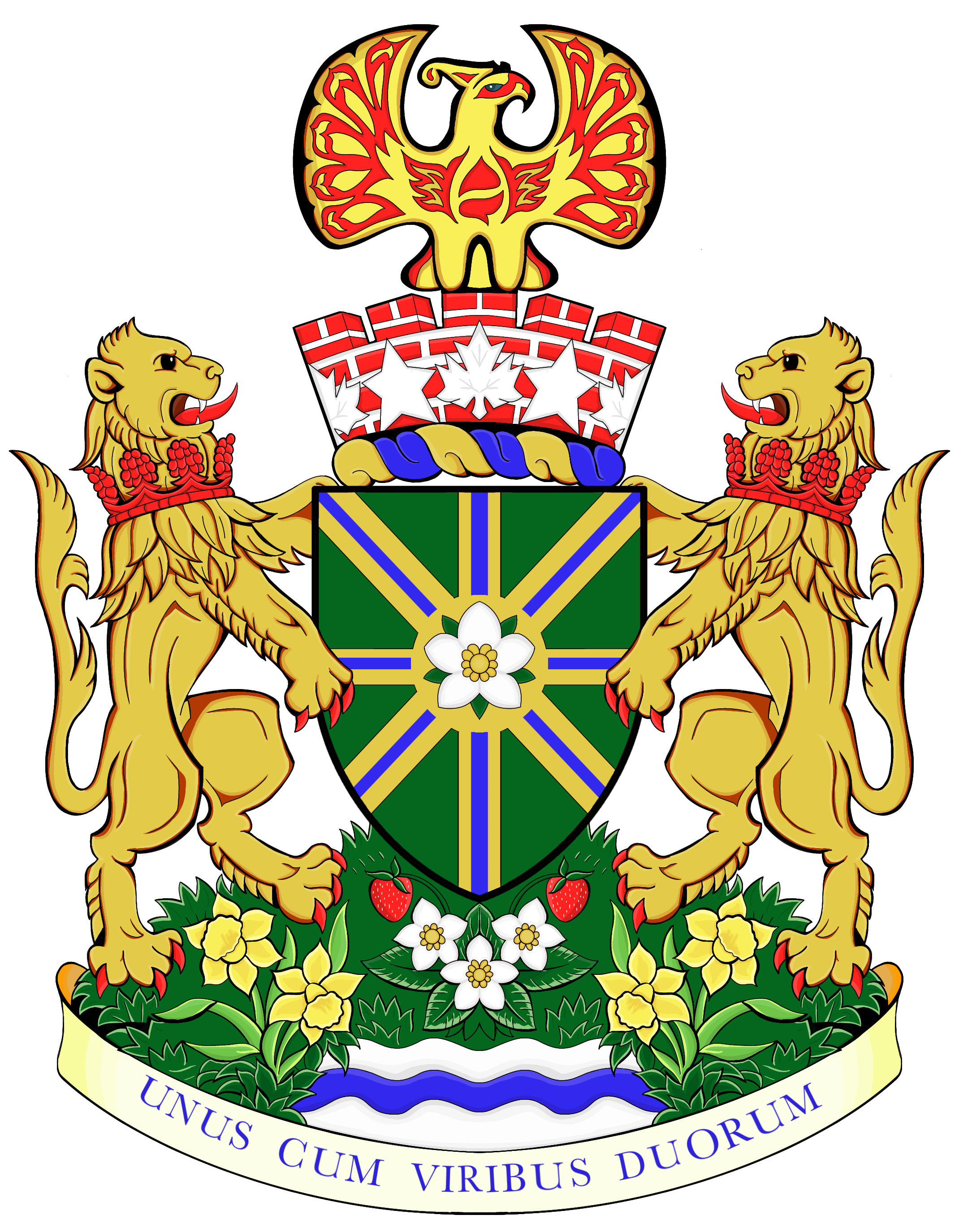
- Armiger: Abbotsford
- Adopted: 1995
- Crest: Issuant from a mural coronet Gules masoned Argent bearing a frieze of alternating maple leaves and mullets Argent a representation of a northwest coast First Peoples thunderbird Or edged Sable embellished Gules
- Torse: Or and Azure
- Shield: Vert a cross and saltire merged Or voided Azure and overall in centre point a bezant charged with a strawberry flower proper
- Supporters: Two lions Or armed langued and gorged with collars the rim heightened with raspberries all Gules
- Compartment: A grassy mound Vert set with a strawberry plant between daffodils proper and rising above barry wavy Argent Azure and Argent
- Motto: UNUS CUM VIRIBUS DUORUM "One with the strength of two"
- Use: Physical representations given to long-service employees and citizens who have contributed to the community; the seal of the city; Mayor's letterhead (colour); signage for buildings; on vehicles; uniform insignia; Chain of Office; city flag; decorative on clothing accessories, stationery items, etc.

The coat of arms of Abbotsford is the heraldic symbol representing the city of Abbotsford. The arms was granted by the Canadian Heraldic Authority on 25 October 1995. The grant included the full coat of arms as well as a flag and a badge, both derived from the arms.

== Symbolism ==
Crest

The mural coronet denotes that these are the arms of a municipality. The red masonry is a reference to the Clayburn brick industry. The band of white stars and maple leaves honour the City of Abbotsford as an historic gateway to the international border with the United States of America. The thunderbird is taken from the crest of the District of Matsqui and commemorates the unique culture and contribution made by the First Nations from the area.

Shield

The gold disc and cross symbolize Abbotsford, known as the “hub” of the Fraser Valley. The strawberry flower is the fraise of the Fraser clan, and is a reference to Simon Fraser, the namesake of the valley. With the amalgamation of the Districts of Abbotsford and Matsqui in January 1995, a primary colour of the former Abbotsford arms was changed from blue to green to reflect the dominant colour taken from the Matsqui arms. The green is also a reference to the rich agricultural lands, meadows and forests associated with the City of Abbotsford.

Compartment

The grassy mound refers to the lands of the City.The daffodils represent its floral riches, and the strawberry flowers allude to the market gardens as well as specialized agricultural production. The wavy bands representing water symbolize the rivers and other bodies of water in the City of Abbotsford.

Supporters

The lions represent the multicultural heritage of Abbotsford's citizens. They are made distinctive to the City of Abbotsford by their collars featuring raspberries coronets, a reference to the abundant raspberry growing industry.

Motto

UNUS CUM VIRIBUS DUORUM ("One with the strength of two") was the motto of the District of Abbotsford, and was adopted as the new City's motto when the district merged with the District of Matsqui in 1995. This Latin phrase represents the strength derived from two separate municipalities becoming one.

== See also ==
- Canadian heraldry
- National symbols of Canada
- List of Canadian provincial and territorial symbols
- Heraldry
