= Bradner, Abbotsford =

Coordinates: 49°06′00″N 122°25′00″W

Bradner is a community within the City of Abbotsford, British Columbia, Canada, located in a rural northwest region of that city which also includes Mount Lehman. Bradner occupies a height of land above the Fraser River, immediately across which is the community of Silverdale, a part of the District of Mission, and Ruskin, on the border between Mission and Maple Ridge. On the floodplain below to the west is the Langley rural neighbourhood of Glen Valley, while on the floodplain to the east, which is called Matsqui Prairie, the nearest Abbotsford neighbourhood is Matsqui Village. Bradner was formerly part of the District of Matsqui, which in 1995 was amalgamated into the City of Abbotsford.

Bradner was named after Thomas Bradner, a settler in the area who homesteaded there in 1895. A Bradner Post Office was designated in 1912 and Bradner was a station on the British Columbia Electric Railway interurban line from New Westminster to Chilliwack after the expansion in 1910. Bradner is near-totally agricultural in nature, and is noted for its annual show of blooms, as the crops in the area are largely floral, particularly daffodils, a legacy of the many farmers of Dutch extraction who helped found that area's agricultural industry.

In 1928, Mr. Fenwick Fatkin, a recent settler from Vancouver, wanted other local growers to showcase their daffodils and this became the humble beginnings of the famous annual Flower Show. In the beginning, only 10 types of daffodils were displayed. Today, there are over four hundred, some of which are still of a Fatkin variety.

Bradner also has a local, monthly newspaper. The Bradner Barker is distributed every month during the months school is in session. It often features work submitted by students at Bradner Elementary.

== See also ==
- Bradner, Ohio
