= TRADEX =

TRADEX can refer to:

- Tradex Technologies, as a former software brand (uppercase form) or a short name for the former company (lowercase form)
- Fraser Valley Trade and Exhibition Centre, as an alternate name for the venue (uppercase form)
- The TRADEX radar is a tracking station on Roi-Namur island in the north part of the Kwajalein atoll in the Marshall Islands
