= Kunimoto =

Kunimoto is a Japanese surname. Notable people with the surname include:

- Keisuke Kunimoto (Lee Gyeong-Woo; born 1989), Japanese/Zainichi Korean race car driver
- Kiichi Kunimoto (born 1981), Japanese mixed martial artist
- Michelle Kunimoto, Canadian astronomer
- Takahiro Kunimoto (born 1997), Japanese football player
- Takeaki Kunimoto (born 1962), Japanese video game composer
- Takeharu Kunimoto (1960–2015), Japanese shamisen player and rōkyoku singer
- Tetsuhide Kunimoto (born 1943), Japanese Businessman
- Yuji Kunimoto (born 1990), Japanese racing driver

== Fictional Characters ==
- Akima Kunimoto, A character from the 2000 animated film Titan A.E.

== See also ==
- 6908 Kunimoto, a main-belt asteroid
