= Matsqui Island =

Island in the Fraser River, Canada

Coordinates: 49°07′00″N 122°20′00″W

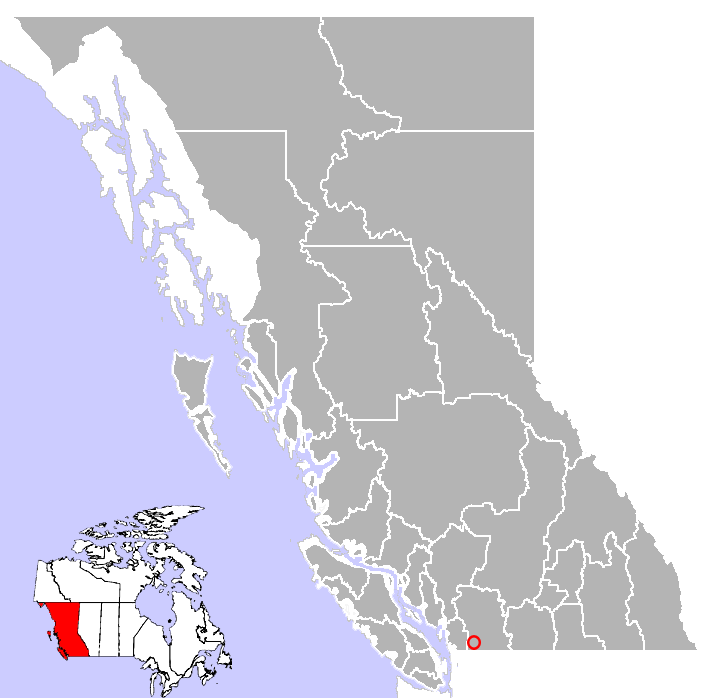
Location of Matsqui in British Columbia

Matsqui Island is a large island in the Fraser River in the Central Fraser Valley region of British Columbia, Canada. It is located north of the City of Abbotsford and south of the City of Mission and about 1.6 kilometres (1 mi) downstream from the Mission Bridge. Though technically located within the District of Mission, Matsqui Island and adjoining sandbars are part of the Matsqui Indian Reserve and are governed by the Matsqui First Nation.

== See also ==
- Matsqui, British Columbia
