= Mill Lake (disambiguation) =

Mill Lake may refer to:

- Mill Lake Park
  - Mill Lake (British Columbia)
- Mill Lake (Idaho)

== See also ==
- Mills Lake (disambiguation)
