= Columbia Bible College =

Canadian Christian college in British Columbia

- Type: Private College
- Established: 1936 as the South Abbotsford Mennonite Brethren Bible School
- Religious affiliation: British Columbia Mennonite Brethren and Mennonite Church British Columbia.
- Academic affiliations: Association for Biblical Higher Education.
- President: Bryan Born
- Faculty: 22
- Administrative staff: 28
- Students: c. 420
- Location: Abbotsford, British Columbia, Canada; 49°3′22″N 122°20′13″W
- Campus: Urban
- Colours: Blue, red, white
- Nickname: Bearcats
- Mascot: Boomer the Bearcat
- Website: columbiabc.edu

Columbia Bible College (CBC) is an evangelical Mennonite Bible College in Abbotsford, British Columbia, Canada. It is affiliated with two regional Mennonite conferences, British Columbia Mennonite Brethren and Mennonite Church British Columbia. Columbia is accredited by the international Association for Biblical Higher Education (ABHE), and is registered with the British Columbia Private Career Training Institution Association (PCTIA).

== History ==
Columbia Bible College has its roots in two Abbotsford schools that merged in 1970.

=== Mennonite Brethren Bible Institute ===
The Mennonite Brethren Bible Institute (MBBI) began in the South Abbotsford Mennonite Brethren Church in 1936 and was called the South Abbotsford Mennonite Brethren Bible School. In 1943, a suitable building was moved to the South Abbotsford church site and the school was renamed Bethel Bible School. Three Mennonite Brethren churches - South Abbotsford, Clearbrook, and Matsqui - joined to support Bethel, which had 34 students that year. The introduction of a high school program led to a temporary relocation of Bethel to a private site in Clearbrook in 1945.

In 1946, the Mennonite Educational Institute moved its high school to a new building in Clearbrook, and Bethel returned to its South Abbotsford campus. Under the leadership of J. F. Redekop, principal from 1944, the school gained the additional support of East Aldergrove, McCallum Road, and Arnold M.B. churches.

In 1955, the Bible School Society (consisting of the six supporting churches) purchased land in Clearbrook and erected what is now the old wing of the classroom building. This became the MBBI.

In 1960, the British Columbia Conference of Mennonite Brethren Churches accepted the responsibility for the operation of MBBI. A record enrolment of 96 was established in 1961–62. The first dormitory was built on the campus in 1962. Increasing enrolments led to two additional dormitories: Redekop Hall in 1966 and Centennial Hall in 1967. A new wing with chapel, classrooms, and music rooms was also added in 1967.

In 1970, Mennonite Brethren Conference of B.C. and the Conference of Mennonites in B.C. entered into a five-year working agreement to operate one Bible school. MBBI merged with Bethel Bible Institute, which was the Conference of Mennonites' school. To accommodate the 189 students enrolled, a new dining room/ student lounge complex was built. In 1970, Bethel Bible Institute became Columbia Bible Institute.

=== Bethel Bible Institute ===
Bethel Bible Institute grew out of the concern to establish a Bible school to meet local and provincial church needs amongst the Conference of Mennonites in British Columbia. In 1939, Rev. N. W. Bahnman announced the opening of a Bible school in Coghlan (now Aldergrove) on the premises of the Bethel Mennonite Church. Twenty-two people enrolled in the tuition free classes at Bethel, which were taught by three instructors without pay.

A society was formed which operated the school for three years (1941–1944), until the Conference of Mennonites in BC assumed full responsibility for the institute. A 4-acre (16,000 m^{2}) tract of land was purchased in Abbotsford next to West Abbotsford Mennonite Church, and a dormitory for women was built. In 1947, the administration building was erected. In 1951–52, enrolment increased to 61 students and a dormitory for men was built. The women's dormitory was renovated in 1963. A teachers' residence was erected in 1964.

When attendance diminished in the 1960s and the facilities needed improvement, a special Bethel Bible Institute Study Conference on the future of the school was held in May 1967. After prayerful discernment and much dialogue with the Mennonite Brethren Conference of B.C. in 1968–70, the Conference of Mennonites decided to close Bethel and merge with MBBI in nearby Clearbrook. Bethel Bible Institute then became Columbia Bible Institute.

=== Columbia Bible Institute ===
The decade of the seventies was one of growth and expansion for Columbia Bible Institute (CBI). To accommodate a record enrolment of 233 students in 1972–73, four extra housing units (mobiles) were added. In 1975–76, a third year was added to the curriculum and a new record enrolment of 266 was reached. In 1976, a three-story, apartment-style dormitory was constructed. Two years later, the apartment complex was sold, and 5 acres (20,000 m^{2}) of land adjacent to the existing campus were purchased for use as an athletics field and for possible campus development. In 1988, Columbia Hall, a three-story residence was completed. An office, administration and library complex was constructed in 1992. An Athletics Centre was built in 2001, home to the "Bearcats". It features two full size courts and seating for 1200. The Student Centre was expanded in 2004, including a new kitchen and dining room, several student lounges, a career and health/wellness center, student life offices, and a recreation room. A new dormitory was completed at the end of 2011, replacing the dormitories dismantled in 2004 to allow for the expansion of the Student Centre. Redekop Hall can accommodate 130 students.

=== Historic covenant ===
The working agreement between the Mennonite Brethren and the Conference of Mennonites at CBI was studied from time to time with the desire to make it a partnership in equality, not merely a partnership in operation. In 1982, this co-operative effort was expanded into a covenant whereby the Mennonite Brethren invited the Conference of Mennonites to unite in the ownership and development of CBI, not merely its operation and governance. At the June 11, 1982 joint convention, the Conference of Mennonites responded to the Mennonite Brethren invitation by affirming a continuing covenant of togetherness in working in God's kingdom. Thus, the first inter-Mennonite Bible Institute in North America was established to actively promote and teach a strong evangelical Anabaptist/Mennonite theology as reflected in the school's Confession of Faith and confessions of the supporting conferences.

=== Columbia Bible College Act ===
On June 26, 1987, the B.C. Legislative Assembly passed the Columbia Bible College Act, giving Columbia the right to grant theological degrees.

== Athletics ==
The athletics teams at Columbia Bible College are known as the CBC Bearcats. The school fields men's and women's teams in volleyball and basketball, and compete in the Pacific Western Athletic Association. The Bearcats hold two national titles: Men's volleyball in 2011, and women's basketball in 2025.

== Notable alumni ==
- Larry Nickel, composer
- Edith Wiens, opera singer

== See also ==
- Canadian Conference of Mennonite Brethren Churches
- Mennonite Church Canada
