= Abbotsford Air Force =

Abbotsford Air Force
| City | Abbotsford, British Columbia |
| League | Canadian Junior Football League |
| Division | B.C. Football Conference |
| Founded | 1987 |
| Colours | Blue and Silver |
| Home field | Rotary Stadium |

The Abbotsford Air Force was a Canadian Junior Football team based in Abbotsford, British Columbia. The Air Force played in the eight-team B.C. Football Conference, which itself is part of the Canadian Junior Football League (CJFL) and competes annually for the national title known as the Canadian Bowl. The Air Force were founded in 1987.

On May 22, 2007, the Air Force announced they would fall to non-playing status for the 2007 season, due to the inability to secure adequate coaching staff.
