= Clearbrook, Abbotsford =

Coordinates: 49°04′34″N 122°19′38″W

Clearbrook is a neighbourhood of the City of Abbotsford, British Columbia, located in the western portion of the city in the vicinity of Clearbrook Road. The area was originally known as Sandy Flats or West Abbotsford, and was located in the Poplar district of the District of Matsqui. It became known as Clearbrook by the late 1940s, most likely named after Clearbrook Road, a road that originally ran from Old Yale Road south across the Canada-USA border to nearby Clearbrook, Washington.

The area was heavily logged in the early 20th century by the Abbotsford Lumber Company and other smaller logging firms which left behind nothing but large stumps and small trees. In 1930 Mennonite immigrants who had migrated to Canada from Russia beginning in the 1870s as well as those who had fled the Soviet Union in the previous decade began settling in the area. After several years spent clearing the land, these early settlers were able to plant strawberries and raspberries before eventually building dairy and poultry farms.

After World War II a commercial area began to develop, with the intersection of Clearbrook Road and South Fraser Way serving as the focal point. Mennonites continued to move to the area, increasing the population to around 4,000 by 1967. A secondary school, the Mennonite Educational Institute, and two post-secondary schools -- Bethel Bible Institute and Mennonite Brethren Bible Institute (the two schools later merged to form what is now Columbia Bible College), were established in Clearbrook in the 1940s, as were a number of Mennonite congregations.

By the 1980s the population of the area had reached around 20,000, due to a large influx of people from a variety of backgrounds, most notably Sikh and Hindu immigrants from India, mainly from Punjab. The area is now indistinguishable from the rest of what is now Abbotsford, although many Mennonite Brethren and Mennonite Church congregations continue to flourish in the Clearbrook area, along with Gurdwaras (Sikh temples) and a Hindu temple.

In 2016, the Berkeley Springs International Water Tasting event declared Clearbrook's water the best-tasting in the world.
