= Michelle Kunimoto =

Canadian astronomer

Michelle Kunimoto (born 1992 or 1993 (age 31–32)) is a Canadian astronomer from Abbotsford, British Columbia, and is an Assistant Professor in the Department of Physics and Astronomy at the University of British Columbia (UBC). Kunimoto had discovered four exoplanet candidates as a UBC undergraduate, using Kepler space telescope data, becoming one of the youngest people to do so in 2016. She was named to the Forbes 30 Under 30 list in 2017. In 2020, she discovered 17 more.

Kunimoto was a postdoctoral fellow at the Massachusetts Institute of Technology and led MIT's planet search team for NASA's Transiting Exoplanet Survey Satellite (TESS) Mission. She leads the TESS Faint Star Search. As of 2025, she has uncovered more than 3,600 planet candidates, including over 100 confirmed exoplanets. Her discoveries include the HD 101581 and HD 260655 planetary systems.
