= Fraser Valley Trade and Exhibition Centre =

Exhibition Centre

Fraser Valley Trade and Exhibition Centre - TRADEX
- Interactive map of Fraser Valley Trade and Exhibition Centre - TRADEX
- Address: 1190 Cornell Street
- Location: Abbotsford, British Columbia, Canada
- Coordinates: 49.02408°N 122.38136°W
- Owner: City of Abbotsford

Construction
- Opened: July 28, 1991

The Fraser Valley Trade and Exhibition Centre or TRADEX is the second largest facility of its kind in Abbotsford, British Columbia, Canada.

Events are ran by independent companies or people (show managers) who are subject to TRADEX policies and procedures. The events vary in type and include consumer shows, trade shows, banquets, agricultural shows, special events, meetings, sporting events, outdoor events, weddings, product launches, film shoots, and ride and drives.

The building has an H-shaped layout of two 60,000 square feet (5,600 m^{2}) halls which can be used independently or for a single large exhibition. It has nine hangar-style doors of varying sizes, the biggest of which allows the passage of objects as large as 90 feet (27 m) wide and 19 feet (5.8 m) high.

The centre hosts the bulk of its events between September and May, during which time events are run almost every weekend. During the rest of the year, the centre hosts fewer events, mostly held outdoors.

== History ==
The centre was constructed as a joint project between the BC Pavilion Corporation (BC PavCo) the Provincial Government, the Municipal Government and Airshow Canada, and was completed in 1991. It was managed by BC PavCo until 2003 when the centre was purchased by the City of Abbotsford and Tourism Abbotsford contracted to take over the operation of the centre.

== Additional information ==
In addition to 120,000 total square feet of exhibition space, TRADEX has:

- Three additional meeting rooms, of varying sizes
- A show office with a private meeting room/lounge
- One loading bay with two loading bay doors
- Fully licensed catering facilities from fast food concessions to banquet for 2,500 people per hall
- A two level food concession area totalling 4,000 square feet (370 m^{2}), with seating for 500 people
- 400,000 square feet (37,000 m^{2}) of paved, gravel and grass parking lot area, totalling 2,500 parking stalls, with over 1,000 being paved
