= Mills Lake (Minnesota) =

Lake in the state of Minnesota, United States

- Location within Minnesota
- Location: Blue Earth County, Minnesota
- Coordinates: 44°5′N 94°9′W
- Type: lake

Mills Lake is a lake in Blue Earth County, Minnesota, in the United States.

Mills Lake was named for Titus Mills, an early settler whose farm was near this lake.

== See also ==
- List of lakes in Minnesota
