= Mill Lake (British Columbia) =

Lake in Abbotsford, British Columbia, Canada

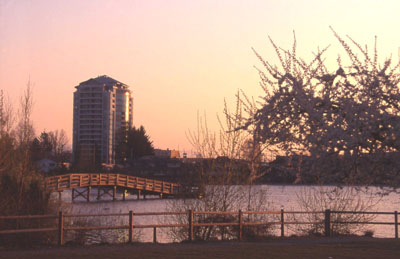
- View of Mill Lake in Abbotsford, British Columbia

- Location within British Columbia
- Location: Mill Lake Park, Abbotsford, British Columbia, Canada
- Coordinates: 49°02′41″N 122°18′39″W

Mill Lake is a small lake in the city of Abbotsford, British Columbia, Canada, located between the Trans-Canada Highway and South Fraser Way. It is the centrepiece of Mill Lake Park.

== History ==
Originally called lake Lekw'ōquem (Le-kwa-kwem) by the indigenous Stò:lō Nation that lived off the land.

Mill Lake's first settler name was "Bais Lake", after an early settler farmer, before being renamed "Abbotsford Lake", due to its location. It was renamed "Mill Lake" because of its role in local forestry.

Around the turn of the twentieth century, Abbotsford resident Charles Hill-Tout opened a sawmill on the shores of the lake, and it contributed over 50,000 railway ties to the Canadian Pacific Railway. In 1903, brothers Joe, Richard Arthur, Sam and Bill Trethewey purchased the mill, and in 1912 opened the Abbotsford Timber and Trading Company. This company swiftly became one of the highest employers in all of British Columbia, producing 20 million feet of timber boards per year. The lake was used to sort the logs that arrived by rail, where they were processed and sent to primarily American markets. The mill remained active until 1934, when the Great Depression and the depletion of local forests forced the brothers to close the site. The Abbotsford Lions Club purchased the site, removed the mill equipment, and began the process of turning Mill Lake into a park, bringing in sand and grass locations for visitors.

== Geography ==
Mill Lake is located in central Abbotsford, bordered to the south by Bevan Avenue, to the east by Ware Street, to the north by Mill Lake Road and Bourquin Crescent, and to the west by Emerson Street and Gladwin Road.

== See also ==
- List of lakes of British Columbia
