= Abbotsford, British Columbia =

Abbotsford
- City
- City of Abbotsford
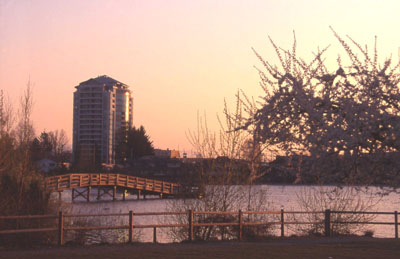
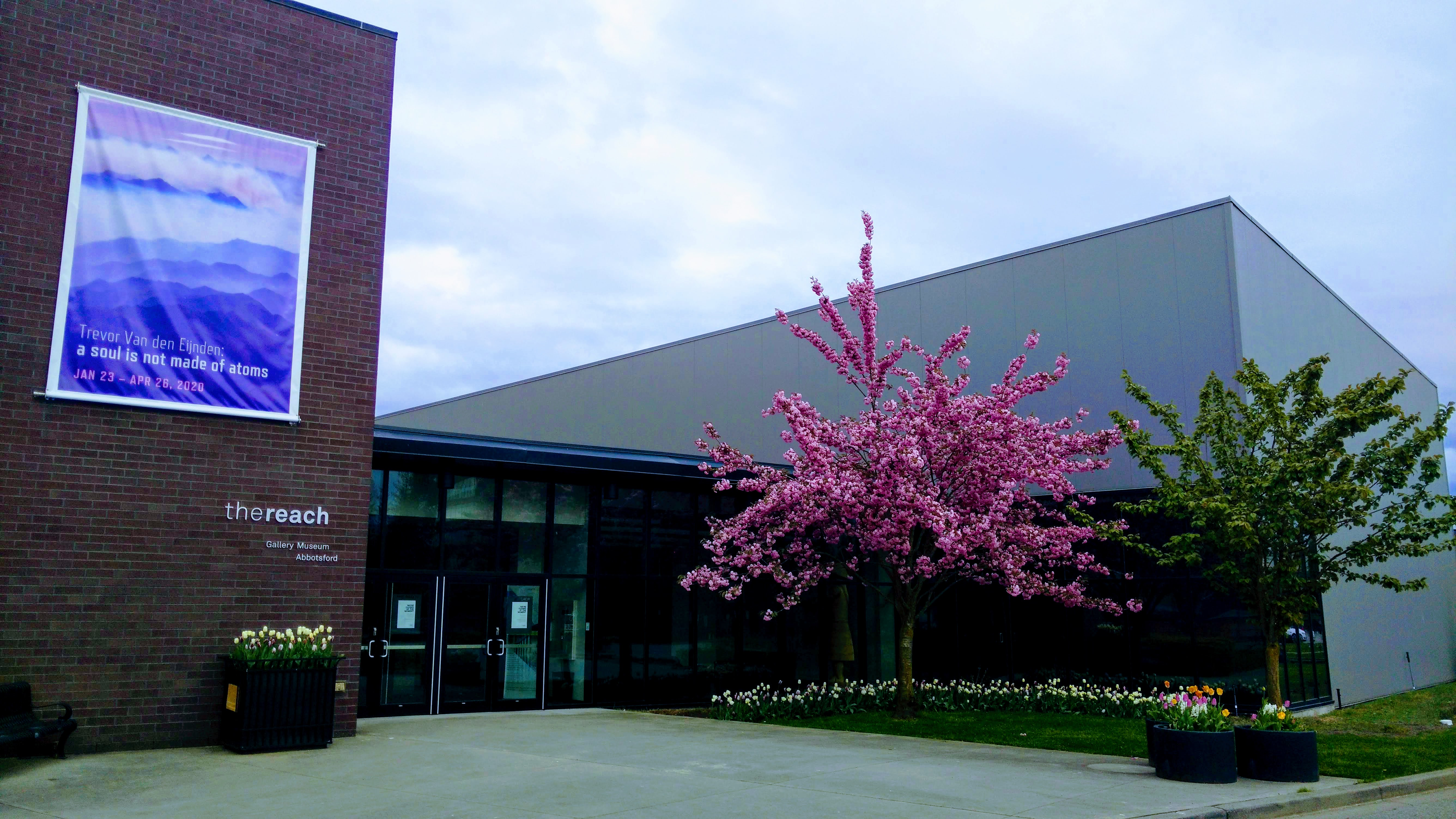
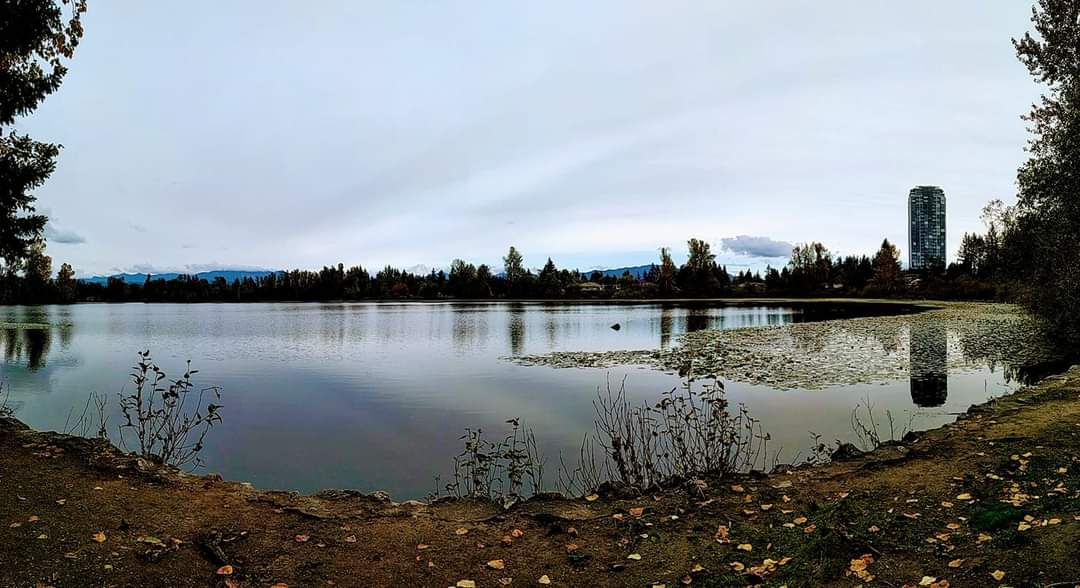
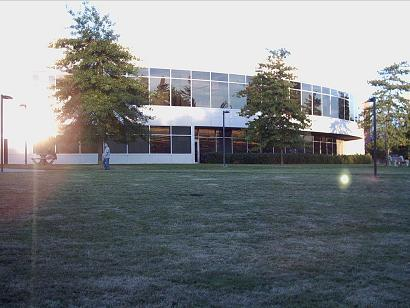
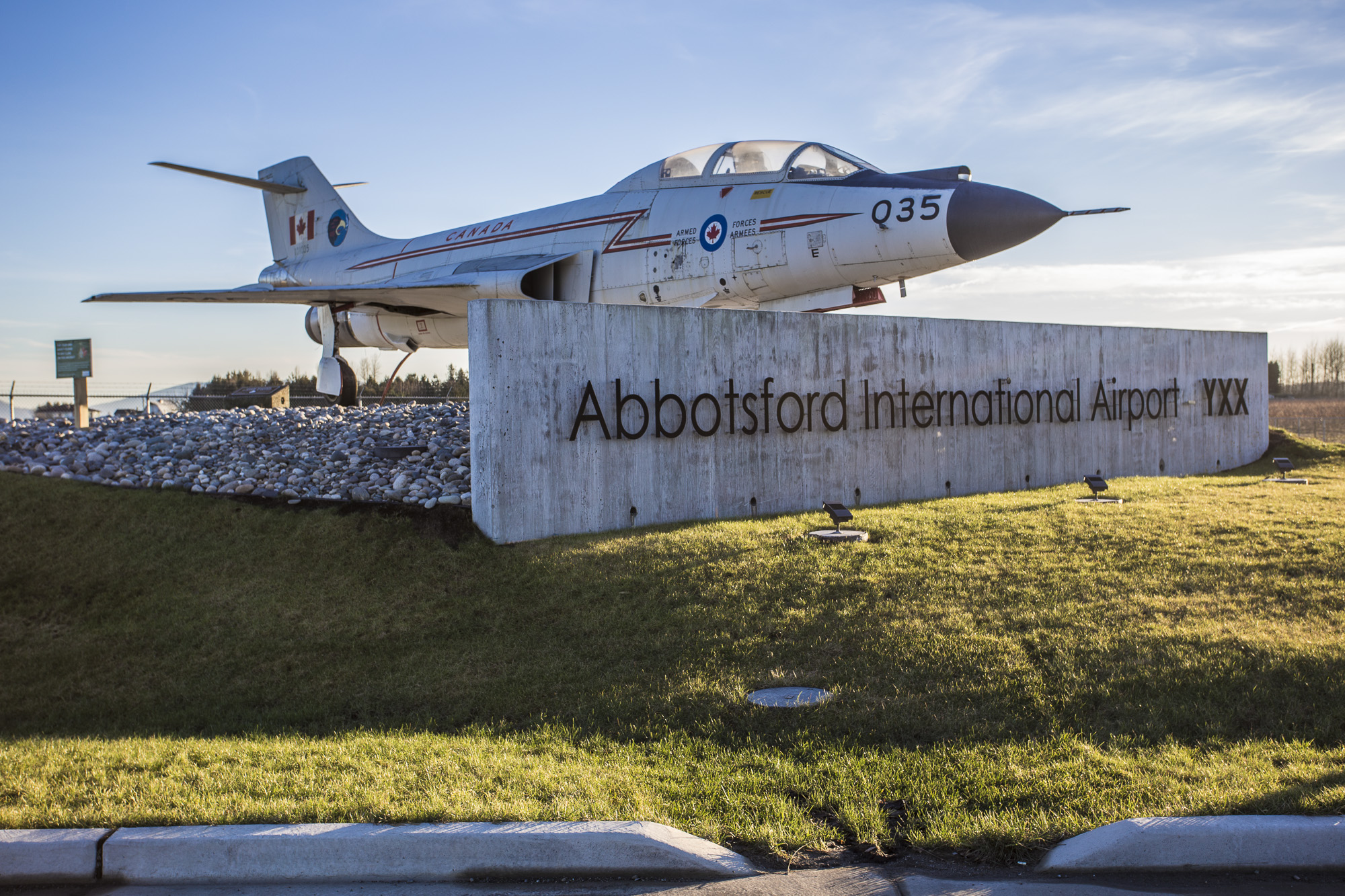
- Abbotsford from Mill Lake The Reach Gallery Museum Mill Lake University of the Fraser Valley Abbotsford International Airport

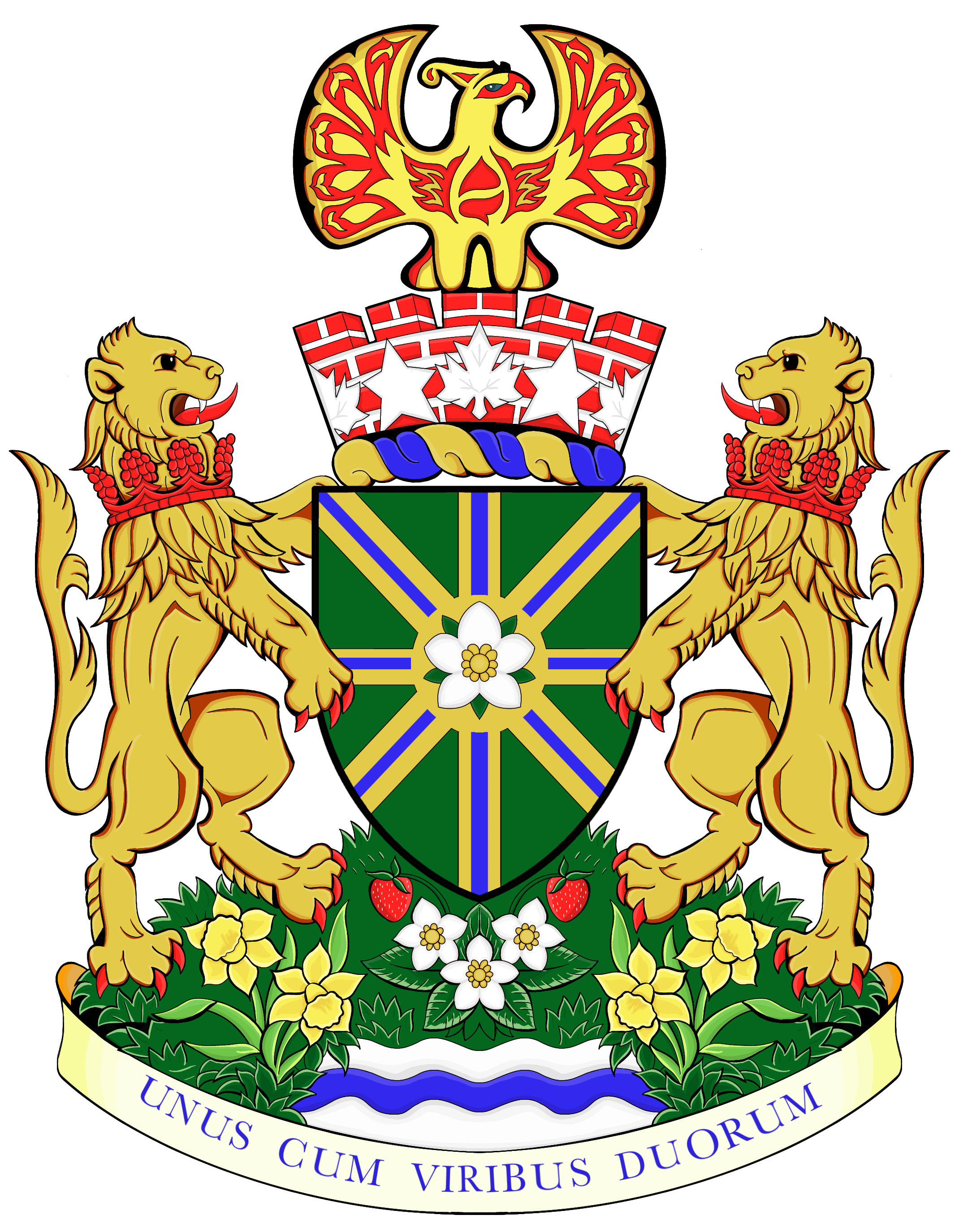
- Flag Coat of arms Logo
- Nicknames: "Abby", City in the Country, Raspberry Capital of Canada, A-Town
- Motto: "Unus Cum Viribus Duorum" (Latin) "One with the strength of two"
- Location of Abbotsford in British Columbia Abbotsford (Canada) Abbotsford (North America)
- Coordinates: 49°03′06″N 122°19′44″W
- Country: Canada
- Province: British Columbia
- Regional district: Fraser Valley
- Established: 1892
- Incorporated: 1945
- Amalgamation with the District of Sumas: 1972
- Amalgamation with the District of Matsqui: 1995

Government
  - Body: Abbotsford City Council
  - Mayor: Ross Siemens
  - City Council: List of Councillors: Les Barkman; Patricia Driessen; Kelly Chahal; Mark Warkentin; Dave Loewen; Patricia Ross; Dave Sidhu; Simon Gibson
  - MP: List of MPs: Sukhman Gill (Conservative) Abbotsford—South Langley; Brad Vis (Conservative) Mission-Matsqui-Fraser Canyon
  - MLA: List of MLAs: Korky Neufeld (BC Conservatives) Abbotsford West; Reann Gasper (BC Conservatives) Abbotsford-Mission; Bruce Banman (Independent) Abbotsford South; Harman Bhangu (BC Conservatives) Langley-Abbotsford

Area
  - Land: 375.33 km^{2} (144.92 sq mi)
  - Metro: 606.72 km^{2} (234.26 sq mi)
  - Rank: 1st in British Columbia
- Elevation: 38 m (125 ft)

Population (2021)
  - City: 153,524
  - Estimate (2022): 168,478
  - Rank: 32nd in Canada; 5th in British Columbia
  - Density: 409/km^{2} (1,060/sq mi)
  - Metro: 195,726
  - Metro density: 322.6/km^{2} (836/sq mi)
- Demonym: Abbotsfordian
- Time zone: UTC−07:00 (PT)
- Forward sortation area: V2S–V2T, V3G, V4X
- Area codes: 604, 778, 236, 672 250
- GDP (Abbotsford-Mission CMA): CA$6.9 billion (2016)
- GDP per capita (Abbotsford-Mission CMA): CA$38,162 (2016)
- Website: abbotsford.ca

Abbotsford (/æbətsfərd/, A-buts-furd) is a city in British Columbia next to the Canada–United States border, Greater Vancouver, and the Fraser River. With a census population of 153,569 people (2021), it is the most populous municipality in the province outside metropolitan Vancouver. Abbotsford–Mission has the third-highest proportion of visible minorities among census metropolitan areas in Canada, after the Greater Toronto Area and the Greater Vancouver CMA. It is home to Tradex, the University of the Fraser Valley, and Abbotsford International Airport.

As of the 2021 census, it is the largest municipality of the Fraser Valley Regional District and the fifth-largest municipality of British Columbia. The Abbotsford–Mission metropolitan area of around 195,726 inhabitants as of the 2021 census is the 23rd-largest census metropolitan area in Canada. It has also been named by Statistics Canada as Canada's most generous city in terms of charitable donations for nine consecutive years.

The community of 375.55 square kilometres (145.00 sq mi) is the largest city by area in British Columbia. The municipality's southern boundary is the Canada–United States border. In Canada, it is bordered by the Township of Langley to the west, the City of Mission to the north, and the City of Chilliwack to the east. Abbotsford borders the town of Sumas, Washington, to the south. Much of Abbotsford has views of Mount Baker (to the southeast, in Washington) and the Coast Mountains (to the north).

== History ==
=== Settlement ===
The first residents of the area are the Stó:lō Nation. The Upper Sumas 6 Indian reserve of the Sumas First Nation is located at Kilgard within Abbotsford city limits.

European settlement began when the Royal Engineers surveyed the area in response to the gold rush along the Fraser River in 1858. This led to the building of Yale Road (today Old Yale Road), the first transportation route to link the Fraser Valley. The settlement grew and the production of butter, milk and tobacco began by the late 1860s. In 1889, former Royal Engineer John Cunningham Maclure applied for a Crown grant to obtain the 160 acres (0.65 km^{2}) that would become Abbotsford.

The Gur Sikh Temple, located on 33089 South Fraser Way, is the oldest Sikh temple in North America. Built in 1908 and opened in 1911, it is now over 110 years old, outlasting the now demolished 2nd Avenue temple in Vancouver (opened in 1908), and the Golden temple (opened in 1905) which was destroyed by fire.

There is some controversy over the origin of the Abbotsford name. The most commonly cited origin is that Maclure named the land "Abbotsford" after family friend Henry Braithwaite Abbott, the western superintendent of the Canadian Pacific Railway. Maclure's sons later stated that the property had actually been named for Sir Walter Scott's home, Abbotsford House, and pronounced it with the accent on ford, In his later years Maclure himself claimed that the naming had been "a combination of two ideas". The Akriggs say that Maclure in an 1894 letter said that when the town was laid out in 1894, the town was named for Henry Abbott, general superintendent of the CPR and brother of Sir John Abbott, prime minister.

=== Contemporary period ===
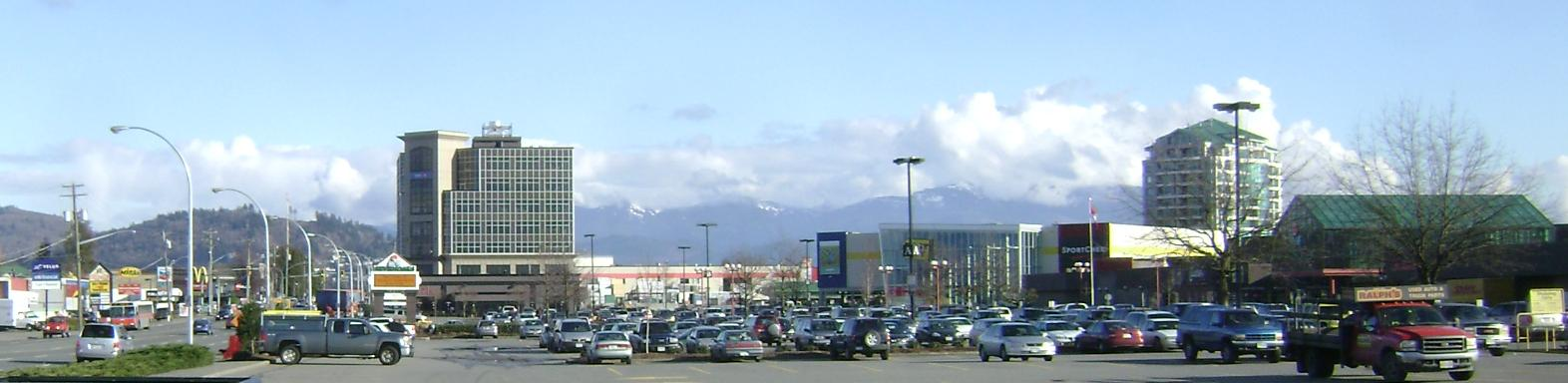
Downtown Abbotsford

The title passed hands to Robert Ward, who filed a townsite subdivision on July 9, 1891. Also in 1891, the CPR built a railway line through the area that connected Mission with the Seattle, Lake Shore and Eastern Railway at Sumas, Washington. This route was the only rail connection between Vancouver and Seattle until 1904. The Village of Abbotsford was incorporated in 1892. At that time Robert Ward sold many of the lots to private investors, but also sold off a significant portion to the Great Northern Railway's subsidiary company the Vancouver, Victoria and Eastern Railway. The British Columbia Electric Railway (BCER) arrived in 1910. The Interurban, as the BCER tram linking Abbotsford with Vancouver and Chilliwack was called, was discontinued in 1950, but BCER's successor BC Hydro retains the right to re-introduce passenger rail service. Service to Vancouver runs from neighbouring Mission by way of the West Coast Express.

The most notable natural disaster to hit Abbotsford was a major flood of the Fraser River in 1948.

In September 1984, Pope John Paul II held an open-air Mass for over 200,000 people at Abbotsford International Airport.

The amalgamation of the Village of Abbotsford and the District of Sumas into the District of Abbotsford occurred in 1972. The District of Abbotsford amalgamated with the District of Matsqui in 1995 to become the City of Abbotsford, raising the population significantly.

In June 2013, the City of Abbotsford spread chicken manure on a homeless camp located in the city. Abbotsford Mayor Bruce Banman publicly apologized for the incident.

The city of Abbotsford has a long and ongoing history of gang-related crime, particularly that of violence and the illegal sale of controlled substances.

On November 16, 2021, Abbotsford residents living in the Sumas Prairie were given an evacuation order, given the flooding in British Columbia at the time, the city calling the situation "catastrophic".

December 2025, four years after the 2021 flood, the community flooded again from atmospheric river with many from the sumas flats evacuated from their homes.

== Government ==
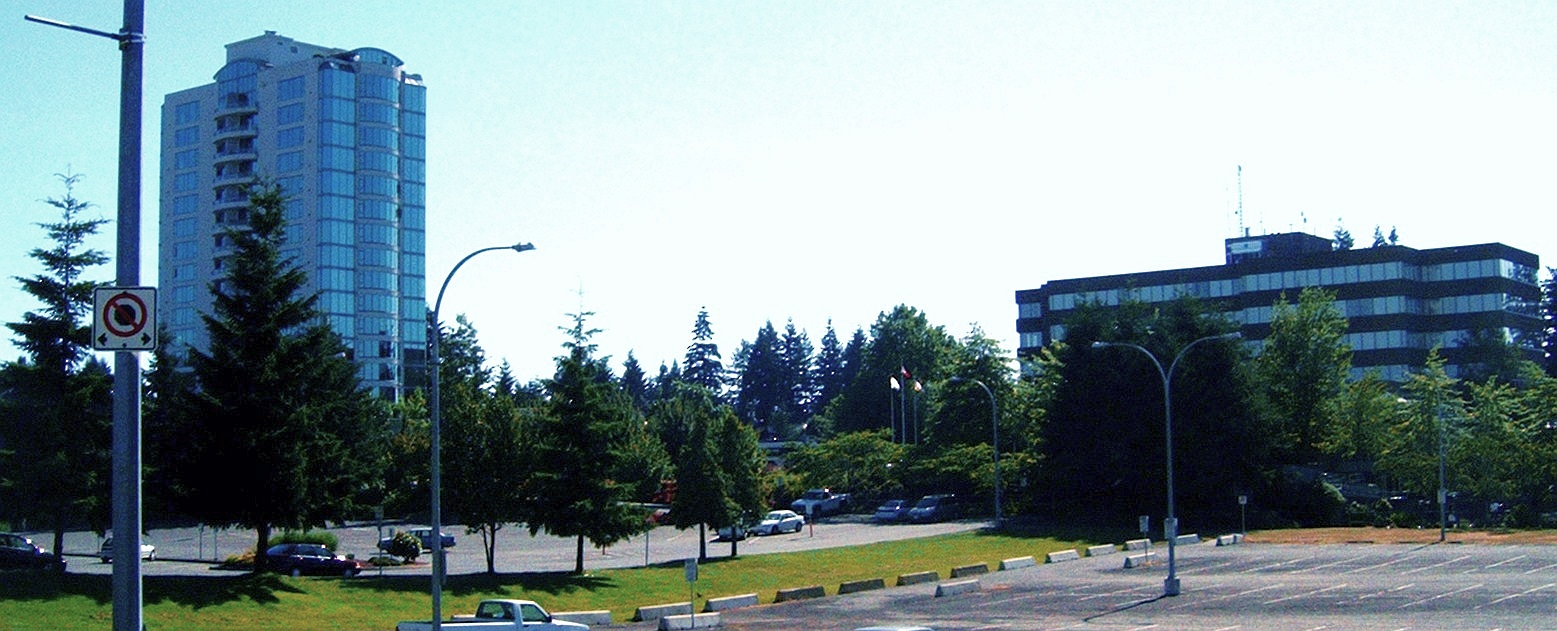
Abbotsford City Hall

Abbotsford City Council comprises a council-manager form of local government. The mayor and council were last elected in 2022. The current mayor is Ross Siemens.

The Abbotsford flag and coat of arms are the same, featuring straight, diagonal crosses representing Abbotsford as at a "crossroads". At the centre is a strawberry blossom to symbolize the local berry industry. The flag of Abbotsford was originally blue in colour. The change to green was initiated in 1995 when the District of Abbotsford and the District of Matsqui amalgamated to create the City of Abbotsford.

== Demographics ==
=== City of Abbotsford ===
Historical population
Year	Pop.	±%
1931	510	—
1941	562	+10.2%
1951	785	+39.7%
1956	830	+5.7%
1961	888	+7.0%
1966	792	−10.8%
1971	706	−10.9%
1976	9,507	+1246.6%
1981	12,745	+34.1%
1986	14,496	+13.7%
1991	18,864	+30.1%
1996	105,403	+458.8%
2001	115,463	+9.5%
2006	123,864	+7.3%
2011	133,497	+7.8%
2016	141,397	+5.9%
2021	153,524	+8.6%
Sources: Statistics Canada (Note: In 1976, the amalgamation with the District of Sumas raised the population. Previous figures were for the square mile of Abbotsford only.) (Note: In 1995, the amalgamation with the District of Matsqui raised the population.)

In the 2021 Census of Population conducted by Statistics Canada, Abbotsford had a population of 153,524 living in 53,234 of its 55,659 total private dwellings, a change of 8.6% from its 2016 population of 141,397. With a land area of 375.33 km^{2} (144.92 sq mi), it had a population density of 409.0/km^{2} (1,059.4/sq mi) in 2021.

The 2021 census reported that immigrants (individuals born outside Canada) comprise 43,190 persons or 28.6% of the total population of Abbotsford. Of the total immigrant population, the top countries of origin were India (23,830 persons or 55.2%), United Kingdom (2,310 persons or 5.3%), Philippines (1,735 persons or 4.0%), United States of America (1,395 persons or 3.2%), Netherlands (895 persons or 2.1%), Vietnam (885 persons or 2.0%), South Korea (850 persons or 2.0%), China (845 persons or 2.0%), Germany (820 persons or 1.9%), and Pakistan (565 persons or 1.3%).

==== Languages ====
According to the 2021 Census, 92,460 persons or 61.0% of Abbotsford's population have English as a mother tongue; Punjabi is the mother tongue of 34,280 persons or 22.6% of the population, followed by German (3,065 or 2.0%), Spanish (1,375 or 0.9%), Korean (1,190 or 0.8%), Tagalog (1,180 or 0.8%), Vietnamese (1,105 or 0.7%), Dutch (990 or 0.7%), French (955 or 0.6%), Mandarin (945 or 0.6%), Hindi (860 or 0.5%), Arabic (720 or 0.5%), Cantonese (555 or 0.4%), Russian (415 or 0.3%), and Urdu (400 or 0.3%).

Furthermore, the 2021 census stated 141,175 persons or 93.6% of Abbotsford's population have knowledge of the English language; 41,145 persons or 27.3% of the population have knowledge of Punjabi, followed by Hindi (7,080 or 4.7%), French (6,295 or 4.2%), German (3,665 or 2.4%), Spanish](2,880 or 1.9%), Tagalog (1,835 or 1.2%), Korean (1,430 or 0.9%), Vietnamese (1,170 or 0.8%), Dutch (1,145 or 0.8%), Mandarin (1,430 or 0.9%), Arabic (1,030 or 0.7%), Urdu (985 or 0.7%), Cantonese (810 or 0.5%), and Russian (805 or 0.5%).

==== Religion ====
A plurality of Abbotsford's population is Christian. Many of the largest congregations in the city are Mennonite Brethren.

The next largest religious group is Sikh. Opened in 1911, the city contains the oldest existing Sikh Gurdwara built in Canada and North America, with earlier Gurdwaras built in Kitsilano (1908) and Golden (1905) since being demolished or destroyed by fire. A National Historic Site, located in Central Abbotsford, the Gur Sikh Temple is now over 110 years old.

The 2021 census reported the religious demography in the city of Abbotsford was:

- Christianity (56,900 persons or 37.7%)
- Irreligion (47,550 persons or 31.5%)
- Sikhism (38,395 persons or 25.5%)
- Hinduism (3,620 persons or 2.4%)
- Islam (2,125 persons or 1.4%)
- Buddhism (1,000 persons or 0.7%)
- Judaism (90 persons or 0.1%)
- Indigenous Spirituality (75 persons or <0.1%)
- Other (1,060 persons or 0.7%)

Religious groups in the City of Abbotsford (1991−2021)
Religious group	2021 Canadian census		2011 Canadian census		2001 Canadian census		1991 Canadian census (Note: Including former District of Matsqui, which would amalgamate with the District of Abbotsford in 1995.)	
Religious group	Pop.	%	Pop.	%	Pop.	%	Pop.	%
Christianity	56,900	37.73%	65,055	49.68%	69,860	61.41%	61,260	71.77%
Irreligion	47,550	31.53%	35,465	27.08%	25,890	22.76%	17,365	20.34%
Sikhism	38,395	25.46%	26,145	19.97%	15,220	13.38%	5,305	6.22%
Hinduism	3,620	2.4%	1,955	1.49%	870	0.76%	555	0.65%
Islam	2,125	1.41%	715	0.55%	390	0.34%	150	0.18%
Buddhism	1,000	0.66%	720	0.55%	1,035	0.91%	405	0.47%
Judaism	90	0.06%	210	0.16%	125	0.11%	105	0.12%
Indigenous spirituality	75	0.05%	25	0.02%	60	0.05%	—N/a	—N/a
Other	1,060	0.7%	665	0.51%	305	0.27%	215	0.25%
Total responses	150,800	98.23%	130,950	98.09%	113,765	98.53%	85,355	98.19%
Total population	153,524	100%	133,497	100%	115,463	100%	86,928	100%

==== Ethnicity ====
According to the 2021 census, the largest pan-ethnic group is European, comprising approximately 55.2% of the municipal population. (Note: Statistic includes all persons that did not make up part of a visible minority or an indigenous identity.) This group includes German, Dutch, British, Irish, Scandinavian and Slavic ethnic origins.

The next largest pan-ethnic group in Abbotsford is South Asian, comprising 30.2% of the city population; this group includes India, Pakistan, Bangladesh, Nepal, Bhutan, Maldives and Sri Lanka national origins; while the population in Abbotsford primarily includes persons of Punjabi ethnic origin. Members of the ethnic group first arrived in the early 1900s to work on farms and in the lumber industry.

This is followed by Indigenous peoples at 4.6% of the population, Southeast Asians (3.1%), and East Asians (2.7%).

Panethnic groups in the City of Abbotsford (2001−2021)
Panethnic group	2021		2016		2011		2006		2001	
Panethnic group	Pop.	%	Pop.	%	Pop.	%	Pop.	%	Pop.	%
European	83,270	55.22%	85,325	61.58%	87,790	67.04%	86,415	70.73%	88,080	77.42%
South Asian	45,505	30.18%	35,310	25.48%	29,725	22.7%	23,360	19.12%	17,005	14.95%
Indigenous	6,855	4.55%	6,595	4.76%	4,460	3.41%	3,565	2.92%	2,500	2.2%
Southeast Asian (Note: Statistic includes total responses of "Filipino" and "Southeast Asian" under visible minority section on census.)	4,610	3.06%	3,110	2.24%	2,005	1.53%	2,130	1.74%	1,650	1.45%
East Asian (Note: Statistic includes total responses of "Chinese", "Korean", and "Japanese" under visible minority section on census.)	4,340	2.88%	4,145	2.99%	3,785	2.89%	4,145	3.39%	2,610	2.29%
African	2,080	1.38%	1,415	1.02%	1,120	0.86%	730	0.6%	500	0.44%
Latin American	1,515	1%	1,120	0.81%	755	0.58%	1,095	0.9%	760	0.67%
Middle Eastern (Note: Statistic includes total responses of "West Asian" and "Arab" under visible minority section on census.)	1,270	0.84%	555	0.4%	380	0.29%	295	0.24%	145	0.13%
Other/multiracial (Note: Statistic includes total responses of "Visible minority, n.i.e." and "Multiple visible minorities" under visible minority section on census.)	1,350	0.9%	985	0.71%	930	0.71%	430	0.35%	530	0.47%
Total responses	150,800	98.23%	138,555	97.99%	130,950	98.09%	122,175	98.64%	113,770	98.53%
Total population	153,524	100%	141,397	100%	133,497	100%	123,864	100%	115,463	100%
Note: Totals greater than 100% due to multiple origin responses

=== Abbotsford CMA ===
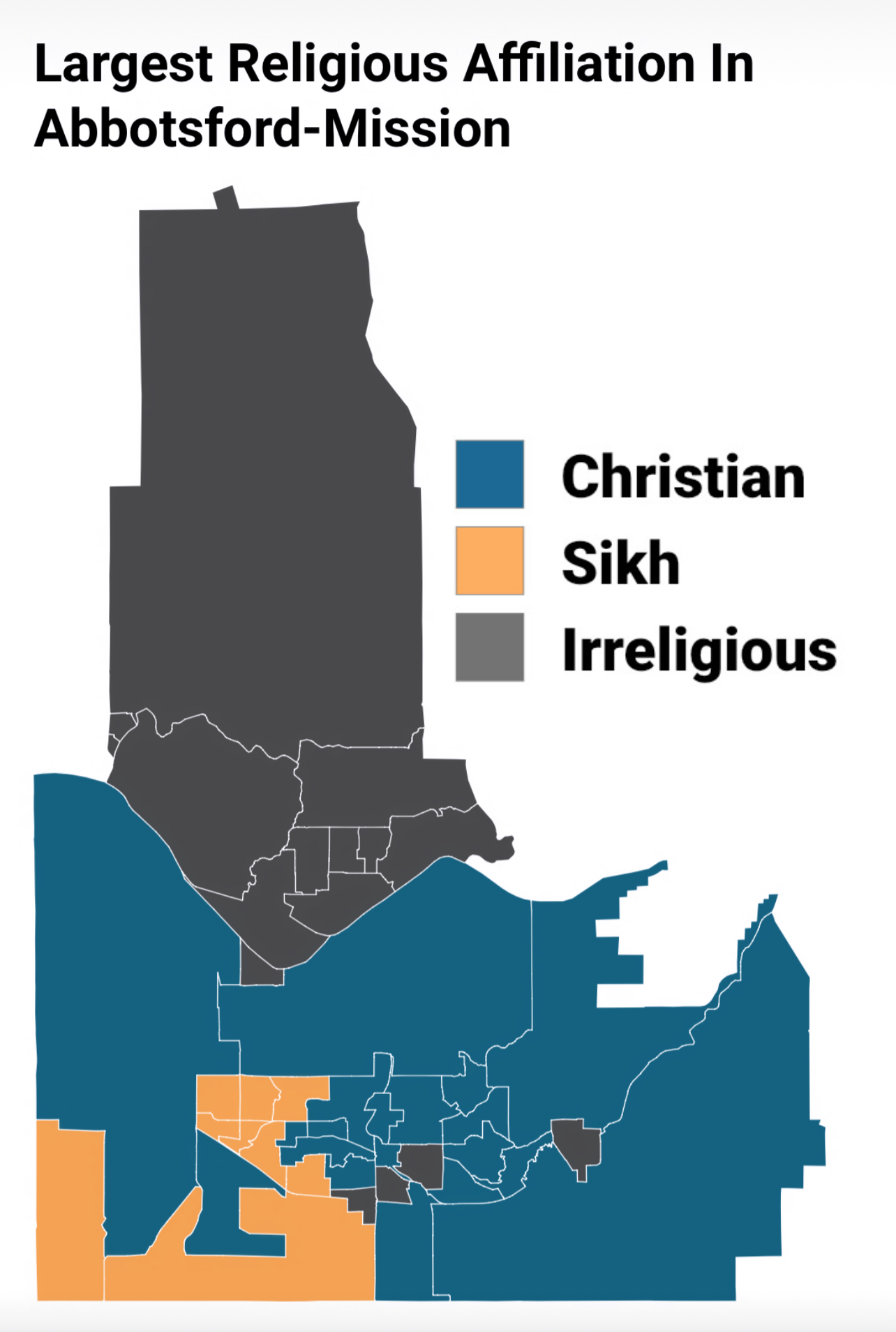
Largest Religious Affiliation By Census Tract in Abbotsford-Mission CMA (2021 Census)

Largest ethnic origin in Abbotsford-Mission CMA by census tract based on the 2021 census

At the census metropolitan area (CMA) level in the 2021 census, the Abbotsford–Mission CMA had a population of 195,726 living in 67,613 of its 70,648 total private dwellings, a change of 8.4% from its 2016 population of 180,518. With a land area of 606.72 km^{2} (234.26 sq mi), it had a population density of 322.6/km^{2} (835.5/sq mi) in 2021.

The 2021 Canadian census reported that immigrants (individuals born outside Canada) comprise 50,085 persons or 26.1% of the total population of the Abbotsford-Mission CMA. Of the total immigrant population, the top countries of origin were India (25,990 persons or 51.9%), United Kingdom (3,295 persons or 6.6%), Philippines (2,065 persons or 4.1%), United States of America (1,725 persons or 3.4%), Germany (1,085 persons or 2.2%), Netherlands (1,070 persons or 2.1%), Vietnam (1,040 persons or 2.1%), China (990 persons or 2.0%), South Korea (930 persons or 1.9%), and Pakistan (600 persons or 1.2%).

==== Ethnicity ====
The Abbotsford-Mission CMA has the third-highest proportion of visible minorities among Census Metropolitan Areas in Canada, after the Greater Toronto Area and Greater Vancouver. The Abbotsford-Mission metropolitan area has Canada's highest Census Metropolitan Area proportion of South Asian Canadians.

Largest panethnic group in Abbotsford-Mission CMA by census tract based on the 2021 census

Largest panethnic group in Abbotsford-Mission CMA by census tract based on the 2011 census

Largest panethnic group in Abbotsford-Mission CMA by census tract based on the 2001 census

Panethnic groups in Abbotsford-Mission CMA (2001−2021)
Panethnic group	2021		2016		2011		2006		2001	
Panethnic group	Pop.	%	Pop.	%	Pop.	%	Pop.	%	Pop.	%
European (Note: 2001–2016: Statistic includes all persons that did not make up part of a visible minority or an indigenous identity.) (Note: 2021: Statistic includes all persons belonging to the non-indigenous and non-visible minority "White" population group.)	113,740	59.2%	115,345	65.41%	117,210	70.32%	113,960	72.75%	115,020	79.33%
South Asian	49,835	25.94%	38,250	21.69%	32,245	19.35%	25,580	16.33%	18,660	12.87%
Indigenous	10,525	5.48%	9,755	5.53%	6,965	4.18%	5,805	3.71%	4,210	2.9%
Southeast Asian	5,630	2.93%	3,525	2%	2,110	1.27%	2,390	1.53%	1,820	1.26%
East Asian	5,135	2.67%	4,660	2.64%	4,215	2.53%	4,680	2.99%	2,915	2.01%
African	2,375	1.24%	1,670	0.95%	1,435	0.86%	930	0.59%	595	0.41%
Latin American	1,855	0.97%	1,430	0.81%	935	0.56%	1,280	0.82%	995	0.69%
Middle Eastern	1,505	0.78%	605	0.34%	505	0.3%	360	0.23%	180	0.12%
Other	1,635	0.85%	1,080	0.61%	1,055	0.63%	485	0.31%	595	0.41%
Total responses	192,115	98.16%	176,330	97.68%	166,680	97.94%	156,640	98.5%	144,985	98.38%
Total population	195,726	100%	180,518	100%	170,191	100%	159,020	100%	147,370	100%
Note: Totals greater than 100% due to multiple origin responses

Ethnic origin	Population (2006)	Percent of 156,640 (Note: Percentages total more than 100% due to multiple responses e.g. German-East Indian, Norwegian-Irish-Polish)	Comments
Cornish	10	0.01%	
English	42,190	26.93%	
Irish	21,430	13.68%	
Manx	40	0.03%	
Scottish	28,695	18.32%	
Welsh	3,665	2.34%	
misc. British Isles, n.i.e. (Note: Not included elsewhere)	2,265	1.45%	
Acadian	55	0.04%	
French	13,725	8.76%	
Inuit	50	0.03%	
Métis	2,670	1.70%	
North American Indian	5,335	3.41%	incl. First Nations, Native Americans and Alaska Natives
American	2,320	1.48%	
Canadian	30,415	19.42%	
Newfoundlander	65	0.04%	
Québécois	55	0.04%	
Barbadian	15	0.01%	
Carib	15	0.01%	
Guyanese	20	0.01%	
Haitian	135	0.09%	
Jamaican	305	0.19%	
Kittitian/Nevisian	10	0.01%	
Puerto Rican	15	0.01%	
St. Lucian	10	0.01%	
Trinidadian/Tobagonian	95	0.06%	
Vincentian/Grenadinian	15	0.01%	
West Indian	35	0.02%	
Caribbean, n.i.e.	15	0.01%	
Aboriginal from Central/South America	40	0.03%	
Argentinian	35	0.02%	
Belizean	20	0.01%	
Brazilian	130	0.08%	
Chilean	110	0.07%	
Colombian	150	0.10%	
Costa Rican	55	0.04%	
Ecuadorian	10	0.01%	
Guatemalan	85	0.05%	
Hispanic	10	0.01%	
Honduran	25	0.02%	
Maya	30	0.02%	
Mexican	475	0.30%	
Nicaraguan	35	0.02%	
Panamanian	10	0.01%	
Paraguayan	195	0.10%	
Peruvian	10	0.01%	
Salvadoran	540	0.35%	
Venezuelan	65	0.04%	
Misc. Latin, Central or South American, n.i.e.	160	0.01%	
Austrian	1,500	1.00%	
Belgian	620	0.40%	
Dutch (Netherlands)	16,645	10.63%	% not incl. Frisians or Flemish
Flemish	110	0.07%	
Frisian	160	0.10%	
German	32,580	20.80%	
Swiss	1,215	0.78%	
Finnish	1,210	0.77%	
Danish	1,950	1.24%	
Icelandic	930	0.59%	
Norwegian	4,715	3.01%	
Swedish	4,240	2.71%	
Misc. Scandinavian, n.i.e.	310	0.20%	may include Sami and Kven
Estonian	175	0.11%	
Latvian	40	0.03%	
Lithuanian	130	0.08%	
Belarusian	70	0.05%	
Czech	590	0.38%	
Czechoslovak	230	0.15%	
Slovak	190	0.12%	
Hungarian	2,150	1.37%	
Polish	4,940	3.15%	
Romanian	1,065	0.68%	
Russian	7,420	4.73%	
Ukrainian	8,090	5.16%	
Albanian	135	0.09%	
Bosnian	10	0.01%	
Bulgarian	60	0.04%	
Croatian	245	0.16%	
Greek	655	0.42%	
Italian	3,675	2.35%	
Kosovar	25	0.02%	
Macedonian	45	0.03%	
Maltese	55	0.04%	
Portuguese	745	0.48%	
Serbian	100	0.08%	
Sicilian	10	0.01%	
Slovenian	125	0.08%	
Spanish	1,600	1.02%	
Yugoslav, n.i.e.	290	0.19%	
Basque	10	0.01%	
Gypsy (Roma)	35	0.02%	
Misc. Slav (European)	40	0.03%	
Ethnic groups in Europe, n.i.e.	260	0.17%	
Afrikaner	25	0.02%	
Bantu	10	0.01%	
Black	140	0.09%	
Congolese (Zairian)	20	0.01%	
Congolese, n.o.s. (Note: Not otherwise specified)	15	0.01%	
Dinka	40	0.03%	
Ethiopian	10	0.01%	
Ghanaian	50	0.03%	
Kenyan	35	0.02%	
Mauritian	20	0.01%	
Nigerian	50	0.03%	
South African	415	0.26%	
Sudanese	20	0.01%	
Tanzanian	15	0.01%	
Misc. African, n.i.e.	130	0.08%	
Egyptian	25	0.02%	
Iraqi	15	0.01%	
Lebanese	85	0.05%	
Maghrebi origins	10	0.01%	
Palestinian	65	0.04%	
Syrian	50	0.03%	
Misc. Arab, n.i.e.	75	0.05%	
Afghan	50	0.03%	
Iranian	185	0.12%	
Israeli	15	0.01%	
Kurdish	35	0.02%	
Tatar	10	0.01%	
Turkish	120	0.08%	
Indian	23,445	16.47%	
Goan	15	0.01%	
Nepali	45	0.03%	
Pakistani	195	0.12%	
Punjabi	2,040	1.30%	
Sri Lankan	50	0.03%	
Tamil	10	0.01%	
Misc. South Asian, n.i.e.	820	0.52%	
Cambodian	50	0.03%	
Chinese	2,585	1.65%	
Filipino	740	0.47%	
Indonesian	205	0.13%	
Japanese	890	0.57%	
Korean	1,665	1.06%	
Laotian	240	0.15%	
Malaysian	50	0.03%	
Taiwanese	75	0.05%	
Thai	100	0.06%	
Vietnamese	1,150	0.73%	
East or Southeast Asian, n.i.e.	85	0.05%	
Australian	265	0.17%	
New Zealander	145	0.09%	
Fijian	100	0.06%	
Hawaiian	50	0.03%	
Samoan	10	0.01%	

Ethnic origin by regional grouping	Population	Percent of 156,640
British Isles origins	65,495	41.81%
French origins (Note: Statistics Canada does not distinguish between European and North American French origins. This category includes Acadians; Québécois-only (not multiple responses) are in North American origins.)	13,745	8.77%
Aboriginal origins (Note: Métis, First Nations, Inuit, Native Americans, Alaska Natives)	7,860	5.02%
Other North American origins (Note: American, Canadian, Québécois, Newfoundlander; does not include aboriginal peoples)	31,870	20.34%
Caribbean origins	665	0.43%
Latin, Central and South American origins (Note: Including aboriginal people of South and Central America)	2,070	1.32%
Western European origins (Note: Germany, Austria, Benelux, Switzerland)	46,395	29.62%
Northern European origins (Note: Finland, Sweden, Denmark, Norway, Iceland)	12,140	7.75%
Eastern European origin (Note: Slavic and Baltic countries, plus Romania, Hungary and Albania)	21,765	13.89%
Southern European origins	7,470	4.77%
Other European origins (Note: Roma (Gypsy), Jewish, Basque, misc. Slav)	840	00.54%
African origins (Note: Excluding Arab countries of the Maghreb, including Afrikaners and other white South Africans)	990	0.63%
Arab origins (Note: Including the Maghreb / North Africa)	320	0.20%
West Asian origins (Note: Afghan, Iranian, Azerbaijani, Kurdish, Turkish, Georgian, Armenian)	410	00.26%
South Asian origins	25,800	16.47%
East and Southeast Asian origins	7,375	4.71%
Oceanian origins (Note: Pacific Islands, Australia, New Zealand)	565	0.36%

== Climate ==
Abbotsford has an oceanic climate (Köppen climate type: Cfb), with just enough summer precipitation not to be classified as warm-summer mediterranean. Summers are generally warm and drier than at other times of the year and winters are rainy and very mild by Canadian standards. Snowfall can be heavy but usually not very long lasting, on average falling mostly in December and January.

The record high temperature was 42.9 °C (109.2 °F) recorded June 28, 2021. The record high daily minimum was 22.4 °C (72.3 °F) recorded July 30, 2009. The record highest dew point was 23.3 °C (73.9 °F) recorded July 19, 1956. The most humid month was July 1998 with an average dew point of 14.9 °C (58.8 °F). The warmest month was July 1958 with an average mean temperature of 20.8 °C (69.4 °F) and an average daily maximum of 28.4 °C (83.1 °F). August 2004 recorded the month with the highest average monthly daily minimum of 14.5 °C (58.1 °F). August 2017 set a record of no maximum temperature below 22.5 °C (72.5 °F) for the entire month; July 2015 with no temperature below 11.4 °C (52.5 °F), and July 1998 with no dew point below 10.0 °C (50.0 °F).

The lowest yearly maximum dew point is 16.5 °C (61.7 °F) recorded in 1989. The lowest yearly maximum daily minimum temperature is 13.9 °C (57.0 °F) recorded in 1955. The lowest yearly maximum temperature is 27.8 °C (82.0 °F) recorded in 1954.

The average yearly maximum dew point is 19.4 °C (66.9 °F) and the average yearly maximum daily minimum temperature is 17.6 °C (63.7 °F).

Abbotsford

Climate chart (precipitation, max. and min. temperature)
J	F	M	A	M	J	J	A	S	O	N	D
226 7 1	117 9 1	146 11 3	114 15 5	94 19 8	70 21 11	39 24 13	47 25 13	78 21 10	144 15 6	233 10 3	197 6 1
- █ Average max. and min. temperatures in °C
- █ Precipitation totals in mm
- Source: Environment Canada
Imperial conversion
J	F	M	A	M	J	J	A	S	O	N	D
8.9 44 33	4.6 48 34	5.7 53 37	4.5 59 41	3.7 66 47	2.7 70 52	1.5 76 55	1.9 77 55	3.1 71 50	5.7 59 44	9.2 49 37	7.8 43 33
- █ Average max. and min. temperatures in °F
- █ Precipitation totals in inches

Climate data for Abbotsford International Airport Climate ID: 1100031; coordinates 49°01′31″N 122°21′36″W; elevation: 243.8 m (800 ft); WMO ID: 71108; 1991–2020 normals, extremes 1944–present
Month	Jan	Feb	Mar	Apr	May	Jun	Jul	Aug	Sep	Oct	Nov	Dec	Year
Record high humidex	18.8	20.0	24.8	31.2	39.5	49.8	46.2	43.4	40.1	31.2	21.0	18.9	49.8
Record high °C (°F)	18.4 (65.1)	20.6 (69.1)	24.9 (76.8)	29.8 (85.6)	36.0 (96.8)	42.9 (109.2)	38.0 (100.4)	39.4 (102.9)	37.5 (99.5)	29.3 (84.7)	22.4 (72.3)	18.2 (64.8)	42.9 (109.2)
Mean maximum °C (°F)	13.1 (55.6)	14.3 (57.7)	18.7 (65.7)	23.4 (74.1)	27.6 (81.7)	29.6 (85.3)	32.5 (90.5)	32.3 (90.1)	29.4 (84.9)	22.3 (72.1)	15.9 (60.6)	12.9 (55.2)	34.2 (93.6)
Mean daily maximum °C (°F)	6.7 (44.1)	8.9 (48.0)	11.4 (52.5)	14.8 (58.6)	18.8 (65.8)	21.0 (69.8)	24.4 (75.9)	24.8 (76.6)	21.4 (70.5)	15.0 (59.0)	9.5 (49.1)	6.3 (43.3)	15.2 (59.4)
Daily mean °C (°F)	3.7 (38.7)	5.1 (41.2)	7.2 (45.0)	10.0 (50.0)	13.6 (56.5)	16.0 (60.8)	18.5 (65.3)	18.7 (65.7)	15.7 (60.3)	10.7 (51.3)	6.2 (43.2)	3.5 (38.3)	10.7 (51.3)
Mean daily minimum °C (°F)	0.6 (33.1)	1.3 (34.3)	2.9 (37.2)	5.2 (41.4)	8.4 (47.1)	10.9 (51.6)	12.7 (54.9)	12.6 (54.7)	9.9 (49.8)	6.4 (43.5)	2.7 (36.9)	0.6 (33.1)	6.2 (43.2)
Mean minimum °C (°F)	−7.5 (18.5)	−4.8 (23.4)	−2.7 (27.1)	0.3 (32.5)	3.1 (37.6)	6.6 (43.9)	8.8 (47.8)	8.5 (47.3)	4.9 (40.8)	0.4 (32.7)	−4.2 (24.4)	−6.6 (20.1)	−10.0 (14.0)
Record low °C (°F)	−21.1 (−6.0)	−18.9 (−2.0)	−12.8 (9.0)	−4.4 (24.1)	−2.2 (28.0)	1.1 (34.0)	2.2 (36.0)	3.3 (37.9)	−1.7 (28.9)	−7.5 (18.5)	−16.7 (1.9)	−20.0 (−4.0)	−21.1 (−6.0)
Record low wind chill	−26.6	−29.6	−19.7	−7.3	−4.0	0.0	0.0	0.0	−5.4	−13.9	−27.6	−33.3	−33.3
Average precipitation mm (inches)	225.6 (8.88)	117.1 (4.61)	145.5 (5.73)	114.4 (4.50)	94.0 (3.70)	69.6 (2.74)	39.2 (1.54)	47.1 (1.85)	77.6 (3.06)	144.4 (5.69)	233.1 (9.18)	197.3 (7.77)	1,504.6 (59.24)
Average rainfall mm (inches)	204.6 (8.06)	109.3 (4.30)	140.4 (5.53)	113.4 (4.46)	94.0 (3.70)	69.6 (2.74)	39.2 (1.54)	47.1 (1.85)	74.0 (2.91)	145.0 (5.71)	224.8 (8.85)	179.8 (7.08)	1,441.1 (56.74)
Average snowfall cm (inches)	22.1 (8.7)	7.2 (2.8)	5.2 (2.0)	0.8 (0.3)	0.0 (0.0)	0.0 (0.0)	0.0 (0.0)	0.0 (0.0)	0.0 (0.0)	0.0 (0.0)	7.1 (2.8)	14.0 (5.5)	56.4 (22.2)
Average precipitation days (≥ 0.2 mm)	20.5	16.2	19.5	16.3	13.4	12.7	7.2	7.1	9.5	15.7	20.3	20.3	178.5
Average rainy days (≥ 0.2 mm)	18.6	15.3	18.6	16.3	13.4	12.7	7.2	7.1	9.1	15.8	19.6	19.0	172.4
Average snowy days (≥ 0.2 cm)	3.9	2.0	1.7	0.42	0.0	0.0	0.0	0.0	0.0	0.0	1.3	2.7	12.0
Average relative humidity (%) (at 3pm)	74.2	63.6	60.4	56.0	55.4	56.4	53.1	52.3	56.8	66.4	74.2	76.0	62.1
Average dew point °C (°F)	0.4 (32.7)	0.2 (32.4)	2.2 (36.0)	4.4 (39.9)	7.7 (45.9)	10.2 (50.4)	12.3 (54.1)	12.4 (54.3)	10.5 (50.9)	6.9 (44.4)	3.2 (37.8)	0.3 (32.5)	5.9 (42.6)
Mean monthly sunshine hours	68.3	99.0	131.5	171.5	208.7	213.7	276.7	263.2	201.9	122.6	64.7	64.9	1,886.7
Percentage possible sunshine	25.2	34.6	35.7	41.8	44.1	44.2	56.7	59.1	53.3	36.5	23.4	25.2	40.0
Source 1: Environment Canada (sun, humidex and wind chill 1981–2010)
Source 2: weatherstats.ca (for dewpoint and monthly&yearly average absolute maximum&minimum temperature)

== Economy ==
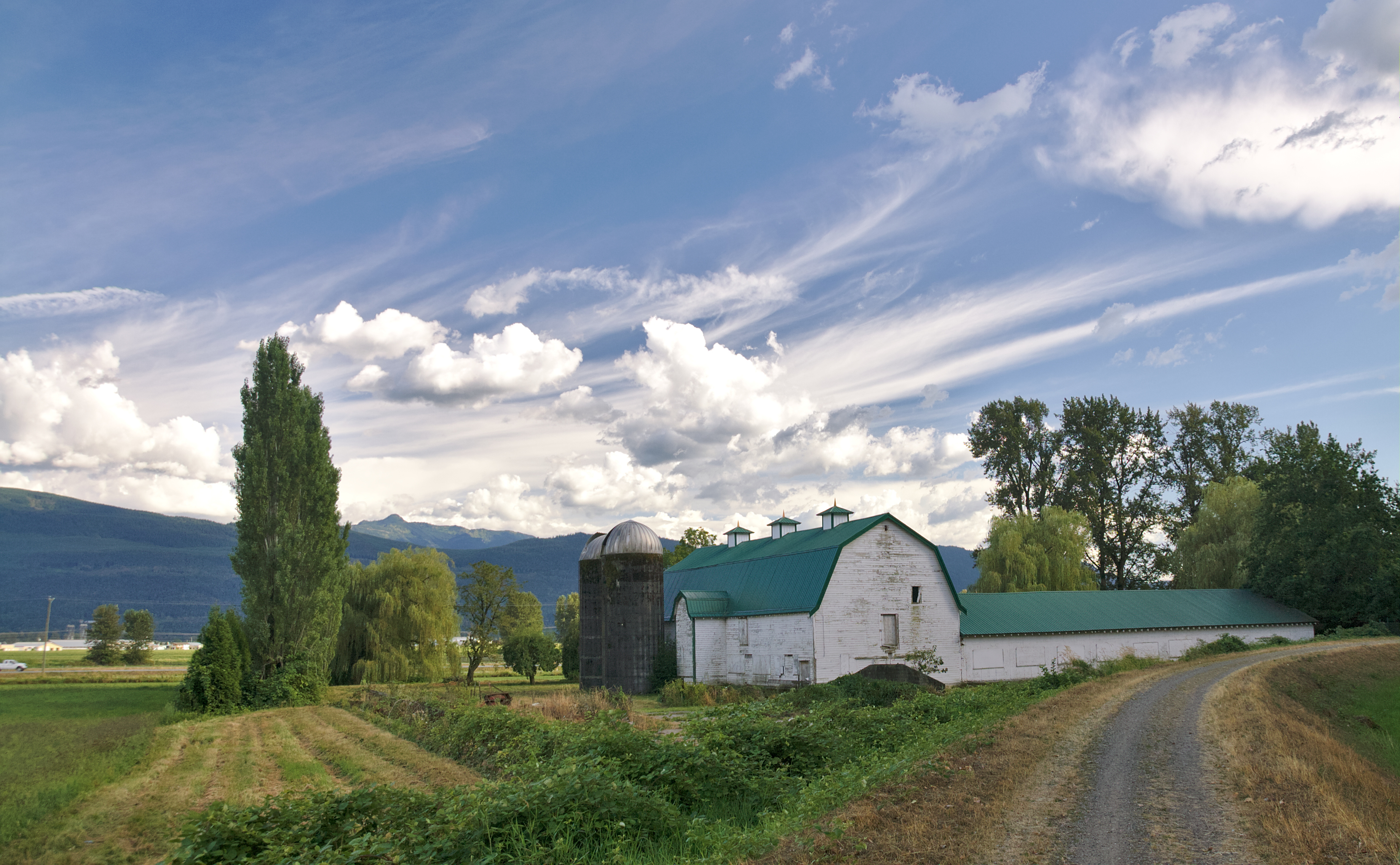
Farmhouse and barn in Abbotsford

Some 62 percent of residents in Abbotsford work in the City of Abbotsford itself. Most of the remaining 38 percent commute to Mission, Chilliwack or Vancouver and its suburbs (primarily Surrey and Langley). More than 25 percent of Abbotsford's workforce commutes to Abbotsford from other municipalities.

The Conference Board of Canada has identified the local economy as one of the most diverse in the country. Abbotsford's main industries are agriculture, transportation, manufacturing and retail. The city earns the highest dollar per acre of agricultural land in the country, greater than the Niagara Region and the North Okanagan. Total sales from agricultural businesses grew from $635,000,000 in 2010 to nearly $1 billion as of 2021 and accounts for almost 50% of all chicken eggs and dairy milk production for all of British Columbia.

The BC government's Animal Health Centre, at the Abbotsford Agriculture Centre offers "more than 400 laboratory diagnostic tests for agents that may be found in wild and domestic birds, mammals, fish, reptiles and amphibians" and is the leading accredited full-service veterinary laboratory in Western Canada. The facility has housed a Biosafety level 3 laboratory since October 2009.

Abbotsford Regional Hospital and Cancer Centre and community health services make Fraser Health the city's largest employer with about 2,500 staff. The city is also home to three federal prisons, each of which employs between 200 and 500 officers and support staff. There is also a growing aerospace industry led by Cascade Aerospace and Conair Group Inc.

Local and privately owned confectionery company Brookside Foods was acquired by The Hershey Company in 2011. In 2016, it announced it would be closing.

== Education ==
Forty-six public elementary, middle, and secondary schools are administered by the Abbotsford School District. This includes a virtual school called the "Abbotsford Virtual School" that offers more than 30 semestered online courses. This school offers a unique animation and modeling program that teaches students aspects of the video game industry as well as many other courses such as Mathematics, English, and Science.

Private schools include Dasmesh Punjabi School, St. John Brebeuf Regional Secondary, Mennonite Educational Institute, and Abbotsford Christian School.

Post-secondary institutions in the city include the University of the Fraser Valley, religious institutions such as Columbia Bible College and Summit Pacific College, as well as career colleges such as Career Gate Community College, Sprott Shaw College, Vancouver Career College, Métis Skills and Employment Centre, and CDI College.

== Arts, culture and heritage ==
The Abbotsford Arts Council hosts a number of free local events including music in Mill Lake Park, the Arty Awards and more recently, the Christmas Artisan Gift Fair. It has been involved in projects such as the Abbotsford "Unity Statue", Abbotsford Christmas Craft Fair, Art in the Park, Abbotsford's Art and Heritage Unity Festival, and the Historical Downtown Art Bench Project. As well as maintaining the Kariton Art Gallery which features and hosts exhibitions from local artists of all mediums residing in the Lower Mainland.

The Reach Gallery Museum features exhibitions from across Canada and around the world, as well as the work of local artists. It houses a heritage archive, runs special events, programs and courses and seeks to promote local arts and culture.

Trethewey House Heritage Site features a restored 1920s Craftsman-style house built by J.O. Trethewey, one of the owners of the lumber and shingle mill that gave Mill Lake Park its name. The municipally designated heritage house and adjacent gallery are open to the public for special events, educational programming, and drop-in tours.

The Mennonite Heritage Museum, which opened in January 2016, features a permanent exhibit that tells the 500-year-old story of the Anabaptist/Mennonite movement, with a particular focus on the history of those Mennonites who settled in Abbotsford beginning in the early 1930s. The Museum also has a gallery that features the work of local Mennonite artists, a coffee shop serving traditional Mennonite foods, a bookstore, and a replica traditional Mennonite housebarn that includes a permanent exhibit focusing on Mennonites and agriculture. The Museum is also home to the library and archive of the Mennonite Historical Society of British Columbia.

Gallery 7 Theatre and Performing Arts has been one of Abbotsford only performing arts organizations since 1991 and operates out of Mennonite Educational Institute. They produce four mainstage productions every year.

== Transportation ==
Public bus transportation is provided by the Central Fraser Valley Transit System. Passenger rail service to Vancouver currently runs from nearby Mission by way of the West Coast Express. Abbotsford is also served by Via Rail's The Canadian as a flag stop. The station is only served by westbound trains towards Vancouver. Eastbound trains call at Mission, British Columbia along the CPR tracks, on the other side of the Fraser River. This split in service between Vancouver and Ashcroft is due to CN and CPR utilizing directional running through the Thompson- and Fraser Canyon.

Station
- Preceding station	Via Rail	Following station
  Vancouver Terminus	The Canadian	Chilliwack One-way operation

Air links are provided by the Abbotsford International Airport. WestJet provides regular scheduled service from the airport, due to its proximity to Vancouver's eastern suburbs. The airport is also the home of the annual Abbotsford International Airshow.

Major transportation routes leading into Abbotsford are the Trans-Canada Highway (No. 1), the Abbotsford-Mission Highway (No. 11) and the Fraser Highway (No. 1A). Access to the United States is via the Sumas–Huntingdon Border Crossing.

== Media ==
Due to its proximity to Vancouver, most Vancouver television and radio stations are also available in Abbotsford, although in a few cases there are repeater stations licensed to different centres in the region.

=== Radio ===
Two radio stations originate from Abbotsford: CIVL-FM, campus radio station of the University of the Fraser Valley, and country music station CKQC-FM.

=== Print ===
- The Abbotsford News
- The Abbotsford Times (ceased publication in December 2013)
- The Punjabi Patrika

=== Online ===
- Abbotsford Today
- Fraser Valley Current

== Sports ==
=== Hockey ===
Abbotsford Minor Hockey is one of the largest associations in British Columbia and is recognized by many as a model and a leader in the development of minor hockey programs. In the 2005–06 hockey season, Abbotsford's bantam AAA team were ultimately the Western Canadian Bantam Champions, and eight individual players from this team (the most ever) were selected in the 2006 WHL Bantam Draft.

The Abbotsford Pilots of the Pacific International Junior Hockey League (junior B level) play at MSA Arena, which is Abbotsford's second largest arena at just over 400 seats. Abbotsford was considered as a possible home for the Chilliwack Chiefs (junior A), who were forced to move in 2006 when the Chilliwack Bruins (a WHL expansion team) took over their arena, Prospera Centre. Abbotsford would have become the home of the Chiefs if the city had supported them in building a new arena; instead, the Chiefs moved to Langley. Construction has now been completed in Abbotsford on a far bigger sports and entertainment centre (with 7,500 seats).

From 2009 until 2014, Abbotsford hosted the NHL's Calgary Flames' American Hockey League (AHL) affiliate, the Abbotsford Heat. Home games were played at the Abbotsford Entertainment & Sports Centre.

On May 6, 2021, the NHL's Vancouver Canucks were approved to relocate their AHL affiliate to Abbotsford for the 2021–22 season as the Abbotsford Canucks.

=== Other sports ===
From 2012 and 2013, the BC Angels of the Legends Football League's LFL Canada division played at the Abbotsford Entertainment & Sports Centre.

Abbotsford's Jane and Gerry Swan Track at Rotary Stadium is home to the Valley Royals Track & Field Club, which has trained several Olympians. Rotary Stadium was also home to the now-defunct Abbotsford Air Force of the Canadian Junior Football League.

Abbotsford’s youth soccer program has won two national titles and numerous provincial titles. Abbotsford is home to the Abbotsford Mariners of the United Soccer Leagues Premier Development League, the highest level of amateur soccer in North America.

Abbotsford is home to many high school sports, with Abbotsford Senior Secondary School, W.J. Mouat Secondary, Rick Hansen Secondary, Robert Bateman Secondary, St. John Brebeuf Secondary, Yale Secondary, and the Mennonite Educational Institute, among others, competing in track and field, volleyball, basketball, and football. These schools have consistently ranked among the highest in the province. The Yale Secondary senior boys basketball team, under Coach Al Friesen, won the 2008 'AAA' provincial boys' basketball championship.

Abbotsford's rugby club supports three men's teams, two women's teams, U19 men's and women's, U15 U16 and U17 men's, and a mini rugby program. Many of Abbotsford's players have gone on to play for Canada, such as Erin Lockwood, Ryan McWhinney, Scott Hunter and Brodie Henderson.

In Olympic sports, Abbotsford's Alanna Kraus has won medals in short-track speed skating.

Club	League	Sport	Venue	Established	Championships	Status
Abbotsford Canucks	AHL	Ice hockey	Abbotsford Centre	2021	1	Active
Abbotsford Heat	AHL	Ice hockey	Abbotsford Entertainment & Sports Centre	2009	0	Defunct
BC Angels	LFL Canada	Arena football	Abbotsford Entertainment & Sports Centre	2012	1	Defunct
Abbotsford Pilots	PIJHL	Ice hockey	MSA Arena	1987	3	Active
Fraser Valley Mariners	USL	Soccer	Bateman Park	2003	0	Active
Abbotsford RFC	FVRU	Rugby	CFV Exhibition Park	1972	0	Active
Fraser Valley Thunderbirds	BCMML	Ice hockey	Abbotsford Centre	2018	1	Active
Abbotsford Air Force	CJFL	Football	Rotary Stadium	1987	0	Defunct
Abbotsford Flyers	BCJHL	Ice hockey	MSA Arena	1976	1	Defunct
Abbotsford Falcons	BCJHL	Ice hockey	MSA Arena	1985	0	Defunct
Valley Rebels	WCSLA	Box lacrosse	MSA Arena	2005	0	Active
Abbotsford Bandits	WCSLA	Box lacrosse	MSA Arena	2000	0	Defunct
UFV Cascades	US	Basketball	UFV Athletic Centre	?	?	Active
UFV Cascades	US	Soccer	MRC Sports Complex	?	?	Active
UFV Cascades	US	Volleyball	UFV Athletic Centre	?	?	Active
UFV Cascades	US	Baseball	Delair Park	?	?	Active
UFV Cascades	US	Rugby	Rotary Stadium	?	?	Active
CBC Bearcats	CCAA	Basketball	Columbia Place	?	?	Active
CBC Bearcats	CCAA	Volleyball	Columbia Place	?	?	Active

== Crime ==
In 2005, the Abbotsford–Mission metropolitan area had the highest property crime rate and the second-highest violent crime rate among cities with a population of 100,000 to 500,000 in Canada.

The metropolitan area had the highest rate of homicides nationally for two years running (2008 and 2009) with a rate of 5.22 homicides per 100,000 population, compared with the national average of 1.81. In 2010, the rate was 2.3.

The City of Abbotsford has its own municipal police force, one of eleven municipal police forces in British Columbia. It is the third-largest municipal police force in British Columbia (behind Vancouver and Victoria). As of 2006, the Abbotsford Police Department employed nearly 200 officers and 80 civilian employees.

The Abbotsford Police Department was officially formed in 1995 when the District of Matsqui and the District of Abbotsford amalgamated to become the City of Abbotsford. Prior to the amalgamation, the District of Matsqui was patrolled by the Matsqui police and the District of Abbotsford by the RCMP. During the referendum citizens elected to keep a municipal police force.

== Cityscape ==
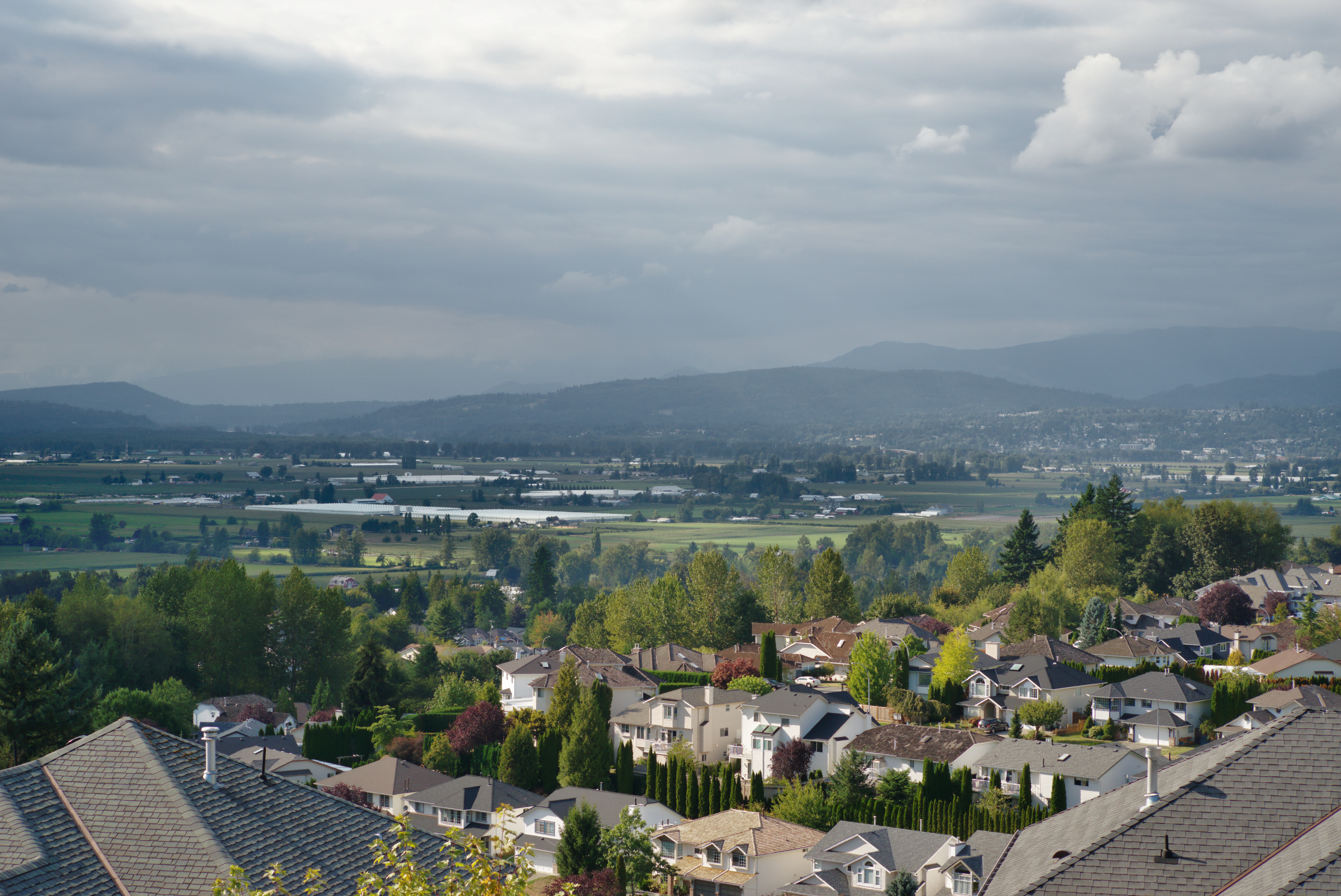
Private residences near Upper Ten Oaks in eastern Abbotsford looking north-by-northwest towards Mission

These places represent parts of the city that have more than one neighbourhood in them.

- Abbotsford East
- Abbotsford West
- Aberdeen
- Bradner
- Central Abbotsford
- Matsqui
- Poplar
- Sumas Mountain
- Sumas Prairie

=== Neighbourhoods ===
- Aberdeen
- Arnold
- Auguston
- Blueridge
- Bradner
- Clayburn
- Clearbrook
- Downtown
- Eagle Mountain
- Gifford
- Glen Mountain
- Huntingdon
- Kilgard
- Matsqui
- McKinley Heights
- Mill Lake
- Mount Lehman
- North Poplar
- Peardonville
- Pepin Brook
- Sandy Hill
- South Poplar
- Straiton
- Townline
- Sumas

== Sister Cities ==
- (Japan) Fukagawa, Hokkaido

== Notable people ==
- Karen Lee Batten
- Chase Claypool
- Kristina Collins, social media personality
- Ryan Craig
- Kyle Cumiskey
- Frank Davey
- Sunny Dhinsa
- Dianne Doan
- Brian Doerksen
- Jacob Doerksen
- Burkely Duffield
- Victoria Duffield
- Jared Falk
- Michael Funk
- Amy Gough
- Derek Grant
- Morgan Griffiths
- Adam Hadwin
- Charles Hill-Tout
- Jacob Hoggard
- Sarah Johnson
- Marek Klassen
- Michelle Kunimoto, astronomer
- Evangeline Lilly
- Gurleen Maan
- Brad Moran
- Greg Neufeld
- Larry Nickel
- Bradley Peters
- Gladys Powers
- Jordan Pritchett
- Nathan Lieuwen
- Mauro Ranallo
- Sophie Schmidt
- Jared Slingerland
- Cade Smith
- Nick Taylor
- Devon Toews
- David Van der Gulik
- Jake Virtanen
- Shane Wiebe
- You Say Party

== See also ==
- Coat of arms of Abbotsford, British Columbia
- Mission Bridge
- Mission Railway Bridge
- Sumas Lake
- Sumas Prairie
