= Mount Lehman, Abbotsford =

Locality in British Columbia, Canada

Coordinates: 49.1186°N 122.3800°W

Mount Lehman or Mt. Lehman (49°07'00"N, 122°23'00"W) is a small rural community located in the Fraser Valley of south western British Columbia, Canada. The community was established in 1874 and became part of the District of Matsqui in 1892. The District of Matsqui was incorporated into the present day City of Abbotsford, British Columbia in 1995.

Mount Lehman is situated on an area of upraised land (hence, where the "Mount" comes into the name), that lies between the flat plains of Matsqui Prairie to the east and Glen Valley to the west. The original historic community can be roughly bounded by the Fraser River in the north, Harris Road in the South, Bradner Road in the West, and Matsqui Prairie in the east.

Mount Lehman is named for Isaac Lehman. In 1875, first cousins Samuel and Isaac Lehman pre-empted many acres of land in the area.

== History ==
In 1874 the area consisted of a heavily wooded plateau of massive cedar and fir trees, sandwiched between two fertile plains just south of the Fraser River. This hardly seemed a likely place for a burgeoning farming community. However, in April that same year, Royal Engineer Alben Hawkins arrived to survey the area and took up residence on the escarpment overlooking the Matsqui Prairie. He became the fourth Anglo-Caucasian to settle on the upraised land that separated Glen Valley and the Matsqui municipality. Charles Malcolm Nicholson and his wife Priscilla and their eight children were already settled there since about 1872, about 1 kilometer to the S.E of Hawkins. However, Nicholson was not a landowner.

Two years later, cousins Sam and Isaac Lehman arrived. Isaac Lehman, and his brother in law, Christian Musselman who were the second pair to be granted pre-emption lands on the escarpment close to Hawkins plot. Christian Musselman's land was directly west of Alben Hawkins while Isaac Lehman's 1/4 section was some distance closer to the Fraser River, located at the NE corner of section 11 township 14. Christian died un expectantly and Isaac's cousin Samuel, his wife Katherine and their six children arrived to take up Christian Musselman's pre-empted lands. These pioneers of the 1870s established the small community that would eventually bear the family name.

Of note is that two other families arrived and settled the N.W. side of the Mount Lehman escarpment prior to 1868. Moses Graff and A. Patterson settled at the far east end of the Glenn Valley. Fort Langley, the HBC outpost, was located at the far western portion of Glenn Valley and it was established in the late 1820s.

A wharf was soon built on the Fraser River at the spot at foot of the bluff and this became known as Lehman's Landing. The landing became an important riverboat stop east of Fort Langley. At the time it was the only entry point into the Matsqui area and was served by paddle-wheel steam boats that travelled up and down the Fraser River between Yale and New Westminster. Lehman and other settlers took on the huge task of logging the area, clearing the dense coastal underbrush and building a network of trails. One of those trails, leading from the wharf to the farming settlement, was called Landing Road. Landing Road was open for vehicular traffic until 1950, and while some of the road remains, the last few hundred metres of the route to the river landing is now just a walking trail. Pilings in the river still remain to mark where the wharf once stood.

Mount Lehman was an attractive location for newcomers, as it was safe from the Fraser's summer floods and plagues of mosquitoes. Once cleared, the forest floor yielded rich farming and pasture lands. People came to settle and by 1883, Thomson's General Store operated at Lehman's Landing. The Mount Lehman Post Office began operation May 1, 1884. The first one-room school was also built in 1884 near the site of the current school. It was replaced by a two-room building sometime between 1909 and 1912, and is the oldest continuously operating school in the Abbotsford School District. The Mount Lehman United Church was established in 1894, and the community hall was built in 1904. The school, hall and church have all operated continuously since they were created.

Until 1910, logging still provided the livelihoods for most of the settlers to the area. Then in 1910 a nearby stop on the new British Columbia Electric Railway changed how the community grew. The railway linked Chilliwack to Vancouver through Mt. Lehman. Eventually, the store was moved from the landing to the school, and then to the site of the railway crossing, along with the post office. Soon a hardware store and service station were added at this same location. Around this time many Mt. Lehman pioneers began to raise vegetables and dairy products. With the arrival of the rail, valley communities became less dependent on the Fraser's paddle-wheelers to take their milk and produce to market in New Westminster. From 1910-1952 the BC Electric Railway provided passenger trains and freight service twice daily and an extra market train came through on Fridays. They also had a milk train every morning to carry dairy products.

By the 1930s, Mt. Lehman was thriving and consisted of a hardware store, a feed co-operative, a bank, two general stores, a post office, a shoe maker shop, a butcher shop, a library, and a train station.

== Today ==
Today Mount Lehman is known as a peaceful rural community, with a mix of busy farms, local estate wineries, small acreages and estate homes. This vibrant community retains its charm, and is an important living link to the region's history.

Typical economic activities found in the area include the raising of chickens, llamas, and to a lesser extent, cattle. Horse raising and boarding stables are also prevalent. There are wine vineyards, blueberry and raspberry farms, as well as orchards and tree farms. There are several major greenhouses that grow crops such as cucumbers, tomatoes and peppers. The opening of several bed and breakfasts has also made the area a new draw for tourists looking to experience a taste of rural living.

Although there are no major supermarkets, gas stations, or corner stores in the immediate area, these are all within a 10 minutes drive. The growth of nearby Abbotsford overshadowed the importance of some of the previously mentioned amenities, and many of these eventually closed down. However, Mount Lehman does offer its own small list of basic amenities. There is a one-room branch of the Fraser Valley Regional Library, the post office is still in operation, there is a fire hall, credit union, insurance shop and a small auto repair shop. The railway continues to operate but ownership has changed and it is now known as the Southern Railway of British Columbia (aka SRY Rail Link). Although the train station closed to passenger traffic in 1952, today, activists are looking at the former B.C. Electric Rail line as a resurrected public transit option. In addition, the United Church and Mount Lehman hall and school are still in operation, and there is an outlet of the Army and Navy that provides a social meeting spot for mostly locals on Friday evenings.

The Taylor home, built by the pioneering family of the same name, is the oldest heritage home in Mount Lehman and still stands on Taylor Road. The Mount Lehman cemetery, also on Taylor Road, is one of the oldest cemeteries in the city of Abbotsford and is still in use today.

Each year there are various community events such as the Canada Day Parade and Mount Lehman Fall Fair. As well the Mt. Lehman Hall hosts various other events and can be rented out for weddings and other functions.

Although there is a historic walking trail at the end of Landing Road leading to the old Lehman's Landing, sections of this trail were recently washed away or buried under landslides. The city of Abbotsford has deemed the area unstable and therefore unsafe for use. A sign has been posted at the start of the trail informing would be users that the trail is closed and urges them to keep out.

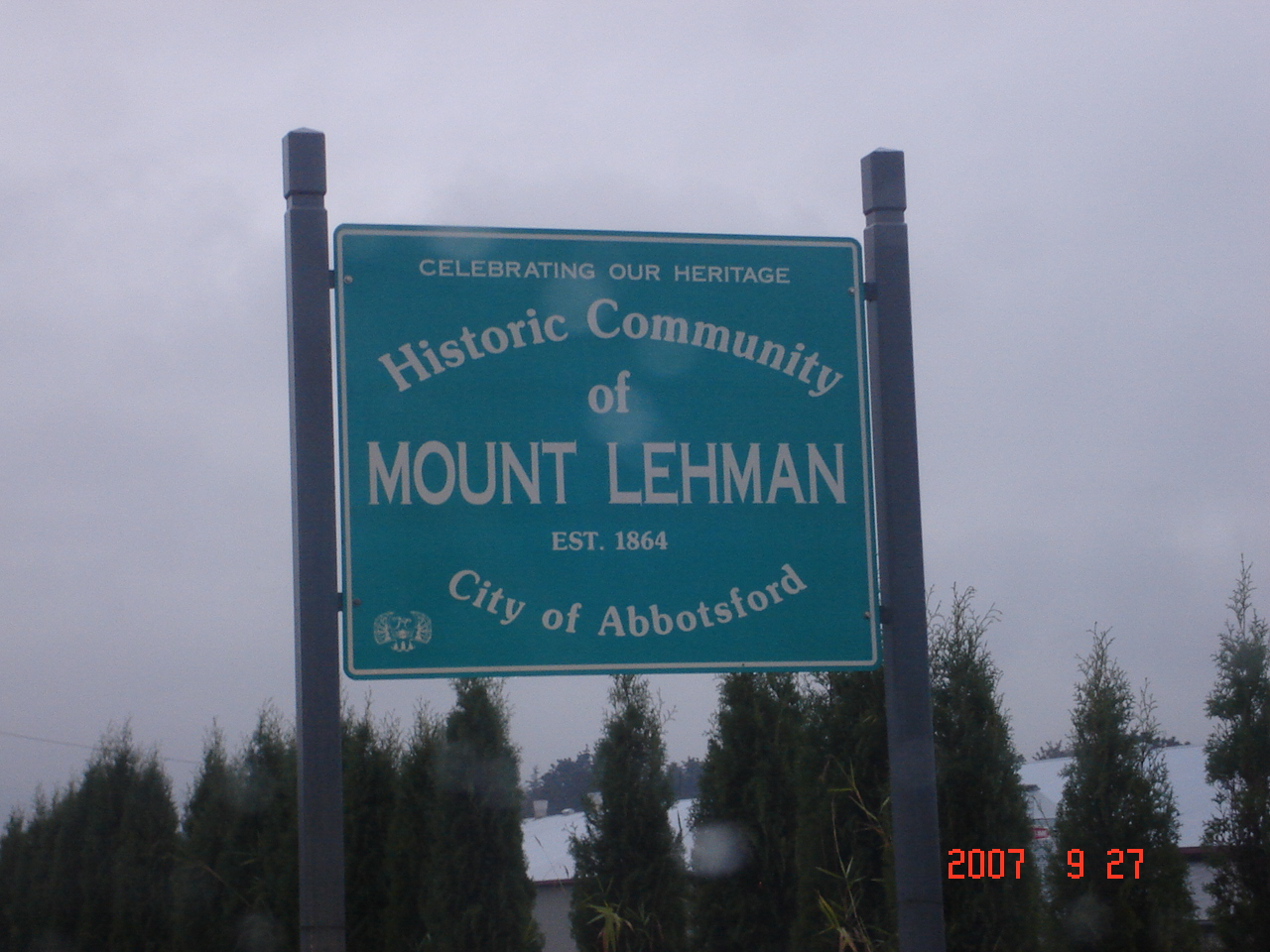
Sign at the side of the road as you enter Mount Lehman, British Columbia.

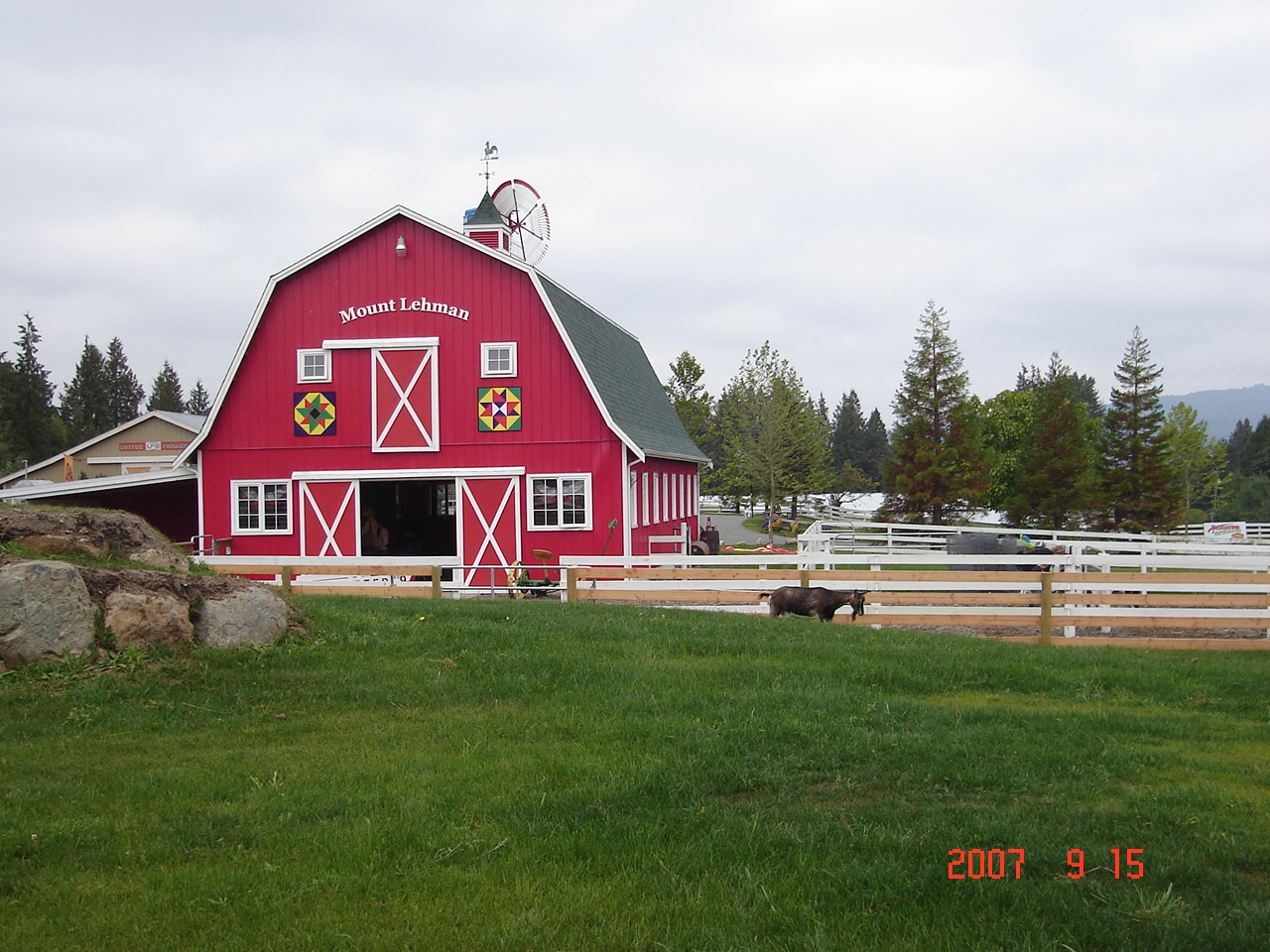
Farm located at the corner of Mt. Lehman and Taylor Roads.

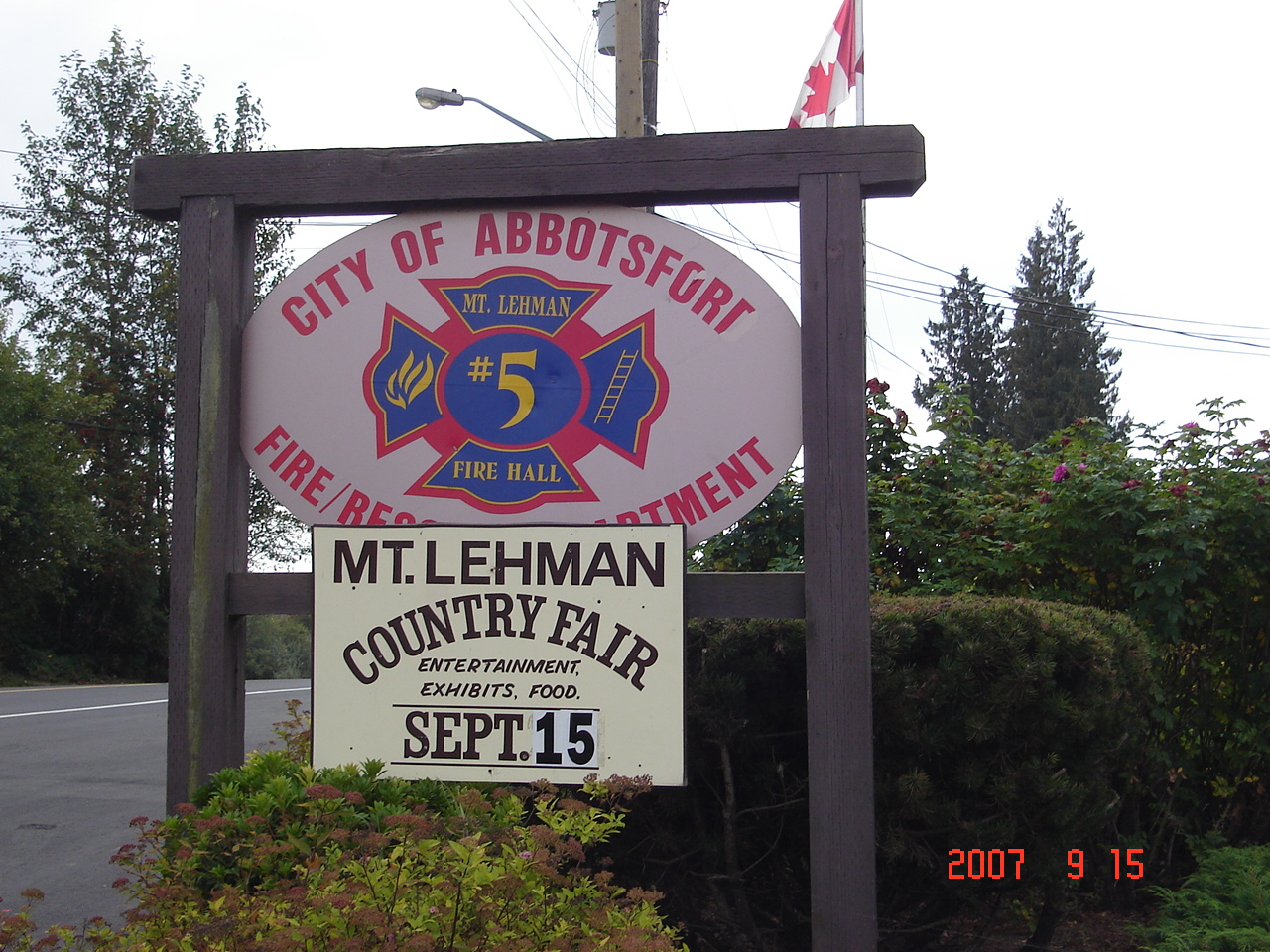
Sign in front of Mt. Lehman Fire Hall on Mt. Lehman Road.

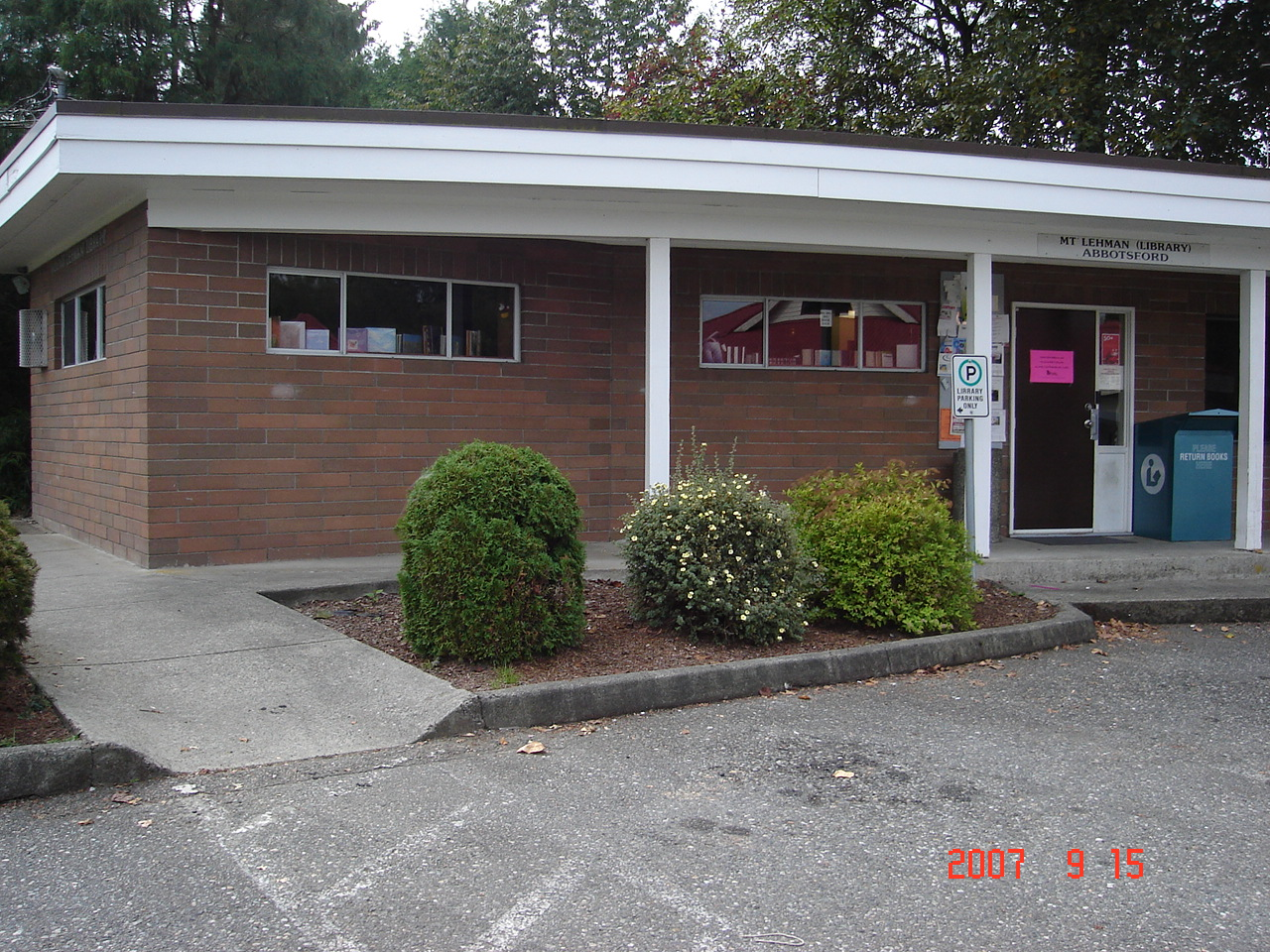
Mt. Lehman's library near the BC Electric Railway crossing.
