= District of Matsqui =

Coordinates: 49°06′30″N 122°17′30″W

Matsqui is a former district municipality in British Columbia, Canada. It was incorporated in 1892 and merged with the district municipality of Abbotsford in 1995 to create the new City of Abbotsford. Matsqui used to be the western part of what is now Abbotsford. It had commercial growth in the Clearbrook area which then spilled over to Abbotsford.

The name Matsqui can also be used to refer to a small historic village located on Matsqui Prairie, known as Matsqui Village, which was also formerly part of the District Municipality of Matsqui. It can be found to the immediate northwest of the present-day junction of Harris Road and British Columbia Highway 11 (just south of the Fraser River) in what is now the City of Abbotsford. A branch line of the Canadian Pacific Railway also runs from Mission, British Columbia, to the US border through the eastern boundary of the village. The Matsqui station of the Canadian National Railway line is northeast of the village, on the far side of Highway 11.

The word Matsqui derives from the local First Nation language Halkomelem, spelt Máthxwi and means a "stretch of higher ground". The Matsqui people, who are part of the Stó꞉lō group historically known as the Fraser River Salish, remain resident in the area to the west of Matsqui Village, to the south of Matsqui Island (which is included in their reserve and is one of the larger islands in the lower Fraser River). Their government is the Matsqui First Nation, which is a member band of the Sto:lo Nation, one of two Sto:lo tribal councils.

Matsqui Prairie refers to the floodplain surrounding the village, which lies between the bulk of Sumas Mountain to the east, the Mount Lehman–Bradner upland to the west, and the upland containing Clearbrook and downtown Abbotsford to the south. Matsqui Prairie was inundated in both of the great Fraser River Floods of 1894 and 1948, with Matsqui Village and surrounding farms devastated by flooding.

A communications station of the Canadian Forces, Canadian Forces Base Esquimalt Detachment Matsqui, is located on the northeastern edge of Matsqui Prairie adjacent to the foot of Sumas Mountain.

== Regional district ==
Matsqui municipality, the original Village of Abbotsford and the former District of Sumas and adjoining unincorporated areas, mostly Sumas Mountain, formed the Central Fraser Valley Regional District prior to the expansion of Greater Vancouver Regional District, and now are part of the Fraser Valley Regional District which includes Mission, British Columbia, and unincorporated areas to its east on the north side of the Fraser; these formerly had been part of the Dewdney-Alouette Regional District with Maple Ridge and Pitt Meadows, which are now in the Greater Vancouver Regional District.

Prior to 1995, Matsqui encompassed McCallum Road west to Station Road (276 Street) and from the border with the United States to the Fraser River. Abbotsford, after its amalgamation with the District of Sumas, encompassed McCallum Road east to the Vedder River and also from the US border to the Fraser River, including the Canadian side of the Sumas Border Crossing.

== Arms ==
Coat of arms of District of Matsqui

Notes
Recorded at the College of Arms 10 March 1967.
Crest
A thunderbird displayed head to the sinister Proper.
Escutcheon
Vert goutté d’eau on a fess wavy Argent between in chief two winged wheels and in base a beehive kiln Or two bars wavy Azure surmounted by a grenade Sable fired between two strawberry sprigs leaved and fructed Proper.
Badge
A thunderbird as in the crest within a wreath of daffodils slipped and leaved Proper.

== See also ==
- Abbotsford, British Columbia
- Fraser Valley
- Fraser Valley Regional District
- Matsqui Institution
- Matsqui people
