= New Westminster Bridge =

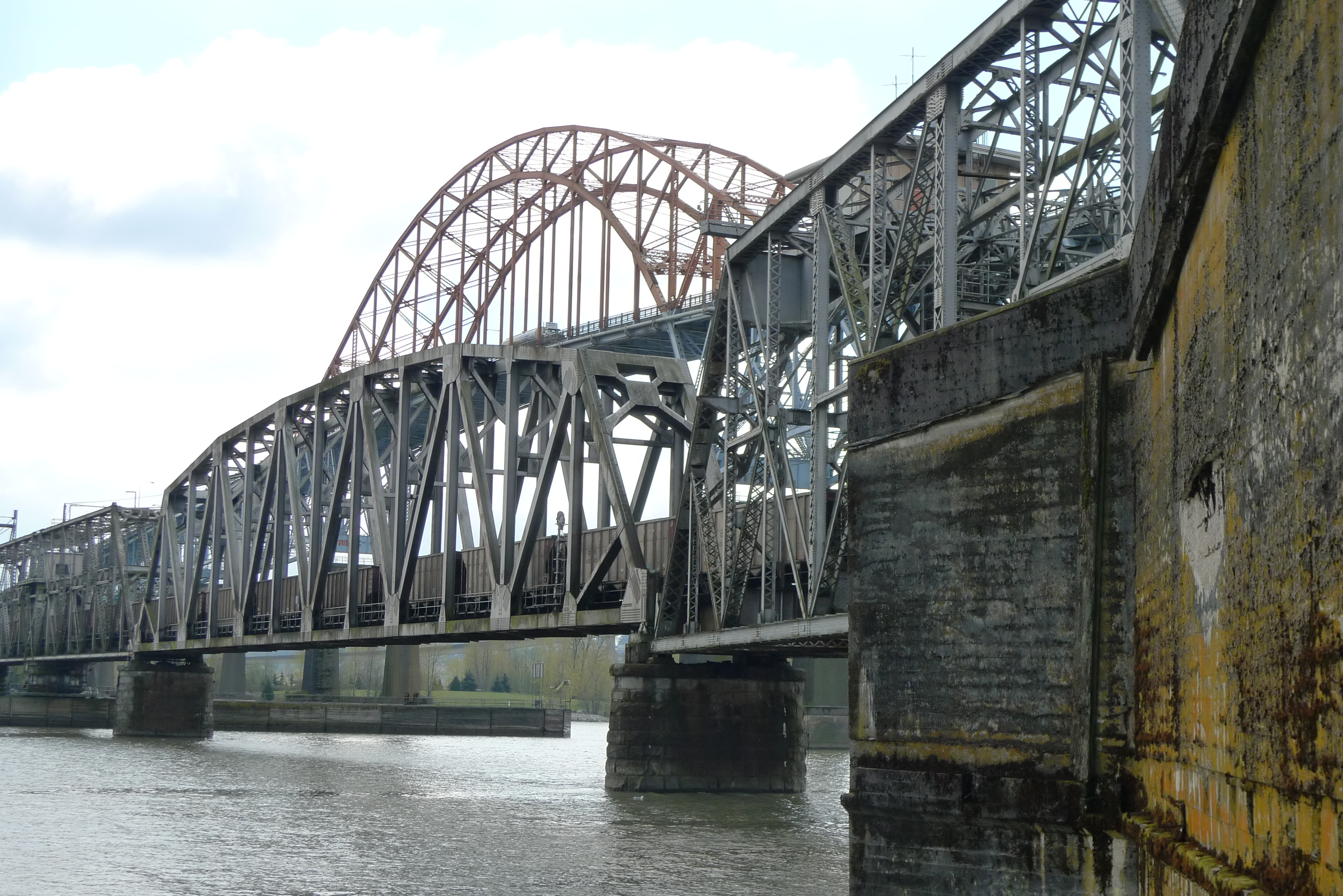
- Coordinates: 49.208167°N 122.894204°W
- Carries: Freight and passenger trains Originally, trains and automobiles
- Crosses: Fraser River
- Locale: New Westminster; Surrey
- Owner: Government of Canada
- Maintained by: Canadian National Railway

Characteristics
- Design: Swing bridge
- Material: Steel
- Pier construction: Granite
- Total length: 543 m (1,780 ft) (not including approaches)
- Longest span: 116 m (380 ft)
- No. of spans: 8 truss spans
- Clearance below: 6.7 m (22 ft)
- Capacity: 60 trains per day

Rail characteristics
- No. of tracks: 1
- Track gauge: 4 ft 8 1/2 in (1,435 mm) (standard gauge)
- Electrified: No

History
- Designer: Waddell & Hedrick
- Construction start: August 1902
- Construction end: July 1904
- Construction cost: CA$1,000,000
- Opened: July 23, 1904

Statistics
- Daily traffic: 33 (as of 2024)

Location
- Interactive map of New Westminster Bridge

The New Westminster Bridge (also known as the New Westminster Rail Bridge (NWRB) or the Fraser River Swing Bridge) is a swing bridge that crosses the Fraser River and connects New Westminster with Surrey, British Columbia, Canada.

The bridge is owned by the Government of Canada. Since 1992, the Canadian National Railway (CNR) has operated and maintained the bridge. The Southern Railway of British Columbia (SRY), Canadian Pacific Kansas City (CPKC), and BNSF Railway have track usage rights. Passenger rail service over the bridge is offered by Amtrak's Cascades (with service to Portland and Seattle), Via Rail's The Canadian (with service to Toronto), and Rocky Mountaineer.

== History ==
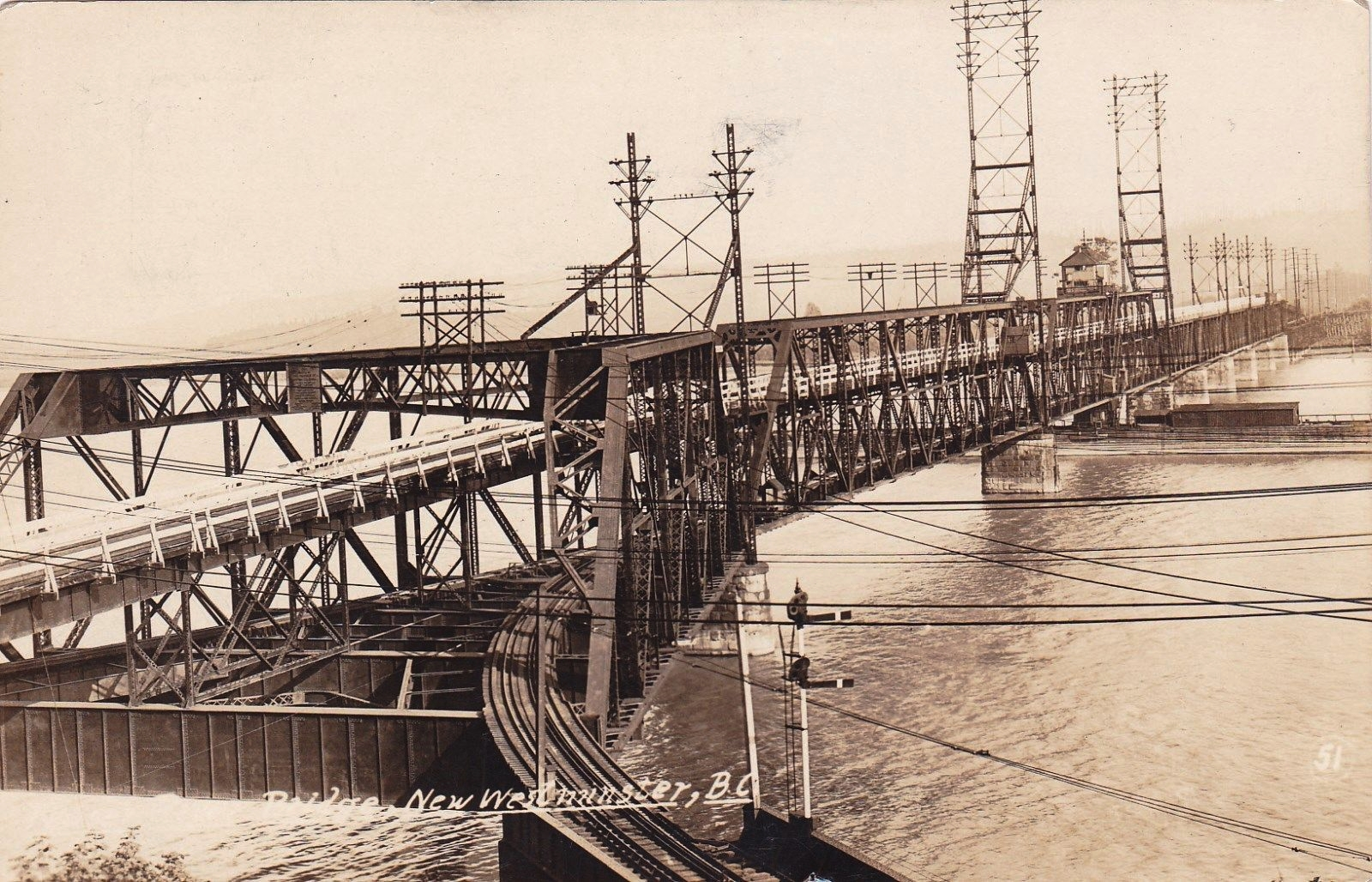
The New Westminster Bridge before the upper-level road deck was removed.

Construction of the New Westminster Bridge began in August 1902, and the new bridge was formally opened on July 23, 1904 by the Lieutenant governor of British Columbia, Henri-Gustave Joly de Lotbinière, alongside the premier, Richard McBride. It was originally built with two decks; the lower deck was used for rail traffic while the upper deck was used for automobile traffic. The rail part of the bridge initially connected Great Northern Railway (predecessor of BNSF) tracks south of the river to Canadian Pacific (predecessor of CPKC) tracks north of the river.

Before the New Westminster Bridge was built, crossing the river required boarding the K de K or Surrey ferry, which docked at the present-day neighbourhood of South Westminster (formerly the historic community of Brownsville) in the city of Surrey.

The toll for the upper bridge was 25 cents and created quite an uproar for farmers who found out quickly that by taking their livestock across on foot would cost them a quarter a head but if they put them in a truck it cost a quarter for the whole load.

After March 1910, passenger and vehicle tolls were no longer charged.

By the 1930s, the bridge was judged inadequate to handle the increased demand in road traffic over the Fraser River. In January 1936, the Canadian Department of Public Works, which was responsible for the marine navigation safety of the country's navigable waters, determined that a dedicated new road crossing could be built under certain conditions. The new crossing would have to be located as close as possible downstream of the current bridge, and British Columbia province would have to either replace the swing span of the current bridge with a vertical-lift span that allowed 76 metres (250 ft) of horizontal clearance and 44 metres (145 ft) of vertical clearance above the freshet level, or remove the existing upper-deck road portion of the bridge and transfer bridge ownership to the Public Works department. The latter alternative was recommended to reduce the number of involved parties, because the federal government already handled marine navigation safety and controlled (before privatisation) CNR, which had become the primary user of the rail portion of the bridge. British Columbia Premier Duff Pattullo quickly declared that the province would take the latter option. The Pattullo Bridge road crossing subsequently opened in November 1937. The upper deck of the New Westminster Bridge was removed, the bridge was converted exclusively for rail use, and in October 1939, ownership of the bridge was given to the federal government.

Although CNR typically accounted for 85% or more of annual traffic, Burlington Northern Railroad (successor to Great Northern Railway, predecessor of BNSF) performed train dispatching for the bridge through at least the mid-1970s, making final decisions from its Seattle office in Washington, United States.

In December 1991, CNR announced that it would be granted a deed of entrustment to the bridge from Public Works Canada, and that it would spend $15 million on bridge repairs. This entrustment agreement specified that the federal government would transfer operational and maintenance control, but not ownership, of the bridge to CNR. The $15 million bridge rehabilitation would add 25 years to the usable life of the crossing.

In 2004, CNR and Canadian Pacific Railway (CPR) began some coordinated operations in Greater Vancouver to address rail capacity issues caused by Canada's growing trade volumes with Asia. These new operations helped to reduce traffic pressures at the bridge. In January 2006, CNR entered an agreement with BNSF to gain operational, dispatching, and maintenance control of BNSF track from the bridge northward and westward to central Vancouver and the South Shore of the Burrard Inlet in exchange for CNR assets in Illinois and Tennessee, such as similar control of interlockers in Chicago, Illinois, and Memphis, Tennessee, and other trackage rights. Because of this agreement, CNR gained contiguous control of its main line corridor from the North Shore of the Burrard Inlet, its Second Narrows Rail Bridge across Burrard Inlet, and Thornton Tunnel by connecting them through the BNSF track to the New Westminster Bridge and CNR's main line track south of the Fraser River. A week later, CNR used its greater control of the BNSF track to expand the scope of its coordinated rail operations with CPR throughout the Lower Mainland. By 2014, the implementation of coordinated rail operations was considered a success in preserving available rail capacity at the bridge, at least on a short-term (20-year) basis.

The bridge is a heavily used single-track railway that supports only low train speeds and is swung open for marine traffic for a significant portion of each day. Because of this situation, studies have been conducted to relocate the northern terminus of Amtrak's Cascades passenger train service from Pacific Central Station in downtown Vancouver southeast by 21 kilometres (13 mi) to Surrey. The proposed new terminus at the Skytrain rapid transit system's Scott Road Station is about 900 metres (3,000 ft) from the bridge. The location would allow additional round trips from Seattle to be added by avoiding the need to cross the Fraser River.

In the early 2020s, CNR completed seismic upgrades to the bridge.

== Description ==
The bridge crosses the Fraser River about 24 kilometres (15 mi) upstream of the location where the river empties into the Strait of Georgia. It is 61 metres (200 ft) upstream of the 1937 Pattullo Bridge road crossing but is about 50 metres (160 ft) downstream of the stal̕əw̓asəm Bridge. which fully opened in 2026 as the replacement for the Pattullo.

The bridge was constructed with five fixed truss spans of 48 metres (159 ft) in length near the south bank of the river (Surrey side). The width of these spans were 5.5 metres (18 ft). North of these shorter spans was the 116-metre swing truss span (380 ft), and then a fixed truss span that was also 116 metres (380 ft) in length. These two longer spans had a width of 5.8 metres (19 ft). The final truss span had a length of 69 metres (225 ft), but its width expanded from 5.8 metres (19 ft) to 41 metres (136 ft) as it neared the north bank of the river (New Westminster side). This unusual feature was designed to accommodate the splitting and turning of the bridge's rail track into eastbound and westbound tracks, which would merge with the existing CPR track along the New Westminster shoreline.

The bridge's lower-deck railway track was vertically aligned with the base of all eight truss spans. The upper-deck road was placed on top of the five shorter truss spans, and was aligned at mid-height on the three longer truss spans. The horizontal clearance was 4.9 metres (16 ft) for both the rail and road decks.

As of 2004, the speed limit for trains was 11 miles per hour (18 kilometres per hour), which had been increased from 8 mph (13 km/h).

The bridge opens for marine traffic about 20 times each day. It takes about 7 minutes for the bridge to swing open or closed. When opened, the swing span provides 51.2 metres (168 ft) of horizontal clearance at a river control depth of 9.9 metres (32 ft) for the New Westminster side of the opening (which usually hosts ship traffic headed upstream), and it provides 48.8 metres (160 ft) of horizontal clearance at a river control depth of 8.2 metres (27 ft) for the Surrey side (which usually hosts ships headed downstream). The deepest part of the river actually flows under the 116-metre fixed span (380 ft), where the water depth under ordinary conditions was 24 to 26 metres (80 to 85 ft) at the time of construction.

== Proposed changes ==
There have been several other proposals to renovate or replace the current swing bridge with a vertical-lift bridge span, because a lift bridge opens and closes faster than a swing bridge, and a lift bridge does not cut the maximum width of the navigation channel in half. Lumber company Crown Zellerbach had requested a lift bridge conversion from 1936 into the late 1960s, because the tides, freshets, river channel currents, and limited horizontal clearance of the swing bridge prevented oceangoing ships from directly reaching its lumber exporting site upstream at Fraser Mills, British Columbia. In 1964, William George Swan, who designed the original Pattullo Bridge and the replacement Second Narrows road bridge, lobbied the federal government to build a wider, vertical-lift bridge in place of the current bridge.

In 1965, after CNR announced plans to replace the Second Narrows Bridge, there was speculation that the original bridge's lift span, which had a 83-metre (271 ft) horizontal clearance, would be used to replace the swing span on the New Westminster Bridge. This transfer would help retain the estimated 75–100 commercial ships that the Fraser River Harbour Commission was losing to Vancouver because of insufficient navigation width through the swing span. The transfer never occurred, as the old Second Narrows Bridge was sold for scrap metal in 1970. In 1976, when the bridge was out of service after having a span destroyed by a ship collision, a conversion to a lift bridge mechanism was suggested again. However, the estimate of 18 months required to build a lift span was considered too much time to sustain a functioning rail network without a working bridge.

By 2003, the bridge handled 46 train crossings per day (out of a rated daily capacity of 59 trains), and it was identified as a first-priority rail infrastructure project in Greater Vancouver. Three improvement scenarios were studied in 2004. The first scenario kept status quo operations between rail carriers but replaced the bridge with a new $110 million, 850-metre-long (2,790 ft), single-track vertical-lift bridge replacement that supports higher speeds, has a higher 11.7-metre clearance (38 ft) when closed, and is expandable to a double-track bridge. The second scenario maintained status quo operations but replaced the bridge with a new $420 million, 7.5-kilometre-long (4.7 mi), single-track tunnel (immersed tube below the Fraser River channel) to replace the existing bridge. The third scenario implemented coordinated rail operations between rail carriers but retained the existing bridge. The study recommended that coordinated rail operations be undertaken.

In 2010, as part of investigations to replace the original Pattullo Bridge road crossing adjacent to the New Westminster Bridge, Transport Canada studied two possible options to replace the rail crossing: a double-track, single-deck bridge at the same elevation for $360 million, and a double-deck bridge for $470 million. CNR advocated its own option, which was a triple-track, single-deck vertical-lift bridge at the same elevation for $600 million. The upstream and middle bridge tracks would connect the CNR-controlled BNSF main line tracks north of the river to the CNR main line tracks south of the river, while the downstream bridge track would be accessible from all 5 approaches, like the lone track on the current bridge.

In the early 2020s, the Canada Infrastructure Bank funded a study to examine freight traffic needs over the New Westminster bridge. The study narrowed down to two options to address traffic growth. The first option was to simply replace the current single-track bridge with a new double-track bridge in the existing location. The second, preferred option was to maintain the existing bridge with structural upgrades, while also building an additional, double-track bridge upstream from the current bridge.

== Incidents ==
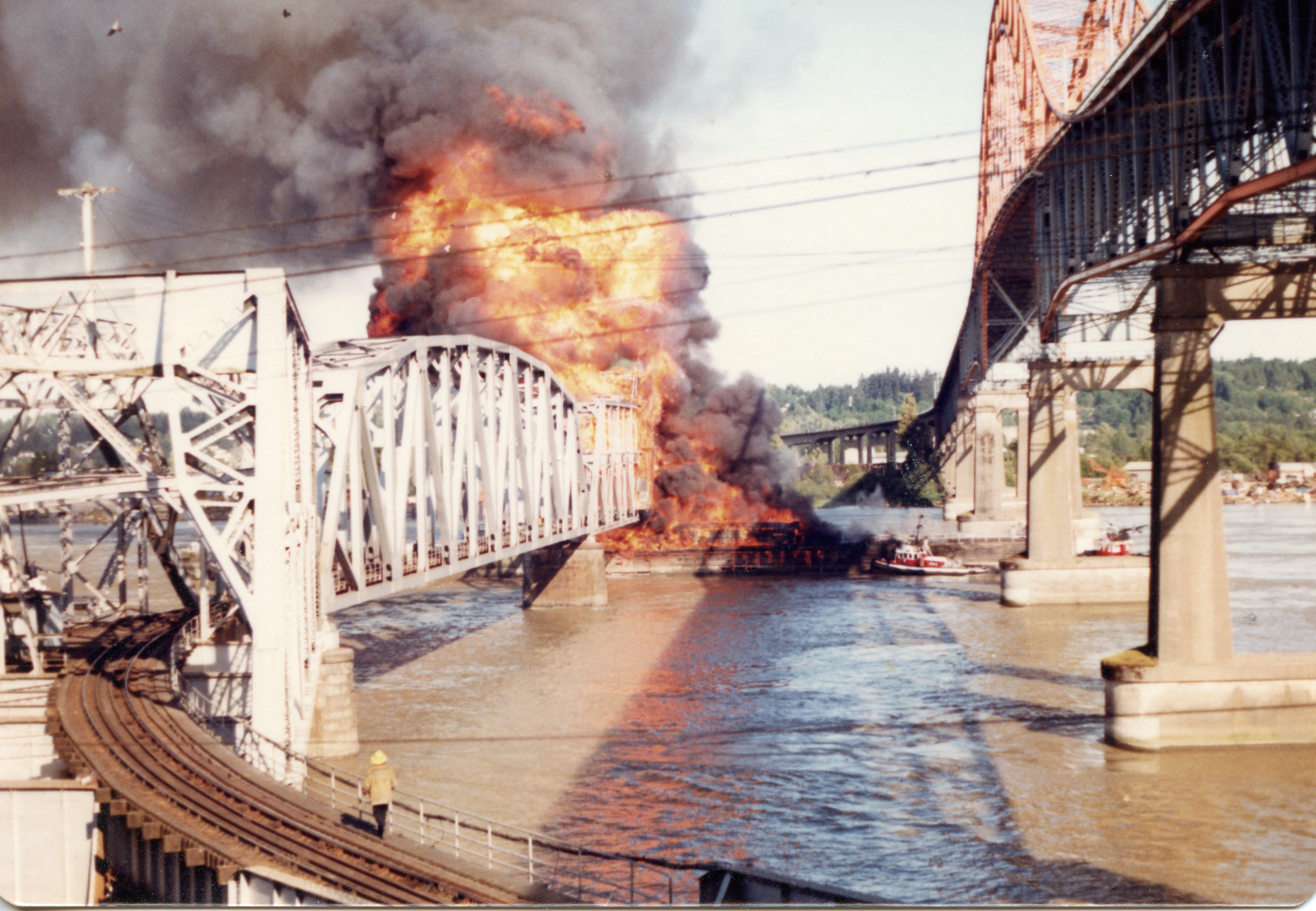
Fire on the New Westminster Bridge in May 1982.

On December 26, 1975, the bridge was damaged when a log barge drifted into and through the structure, ripping out the 116-metre main span (380 ft). The bridge was repaired and returned to service in late April 1976. The relatively quick fix was helped by modifying a recently completed design for a span that was just 1.5 metres (5 ft) shorter, created by the Howard, Needles, Tammen & Bergendoff design firm of Kansas City, Missouri for the Rulo Rail Bridge over the Missouri River in Rulo, Nebraska.

On May 29, 1982, a significant fire broke out on the New Westminster Bridge. The fire put the bridge out of service for almost a month. The bridge reopened on June 23, 1982.

On November 28, 1987, a barge struck the swing span of the bridge. While out of service, the swing span was hit again by a different barge on December 17. The bridge reopened on December 24. Repairs to the bridge cost about $2 million. The resulting legal action of Canadian National Railway Co. v. Norsk Pacific Steamship Co. became a leading Supreme Court of Canada decision.

== See also ==
- List of crossings of the Fraser River
- List of bridges in Canada

== Bibliography ==
- Bernier, Yves (October 1, 1968). "Section Two: Pilotage district of New Westminster" (PDF). Part II: Study of Canadian pilotage - Pacific coast and Churchill (Report). Royal Commission on Pilotage. pp. 242–387.
- Canadian Transportation Agency (February 6, 2019). "§B: Co-production agreement in Vancouver" (PDF). Inquiry report: 2019 Vancouver freight rail investigation — revised (Report). pp. 19–20.
- Engineering News staff (June 22, 1905). "Superstructure and erection". Engineering News. The New Westminster bridge over the Fraser River, British Columbia. 53 (25): 647–648. hdl:2027/coo.31924062323047. ISSN 0096-3690.
- Engineering Record staff (January–June 1904). "The Fraser River Bridge, British Columbia". The Engineering Record: Building Record and Sanitary Engineer (18–22): 544–547, 582–584, 616–617, 644–647, 679–682. OCLC 175311598. Volume XLIX at the HathiTrust Digital Library. (5-part series from April 30 through May 28)
- IBI Group (December 17, 2004). Lower mainland rail infrastructure study (PDF). Greater Vancouver Gateway Council (Report).
- Sanford, Barrie William (2004). Royal metal: The people, times and trains of New Westminster Bridge. Vancouver, British Columbia, Canada: National Railway Historical Society, British Columbia Chapter. ISBN 0-9735602-0-7. OCLC 60835657.
