= Surrey (1891 ship) =

Canadian historical ship

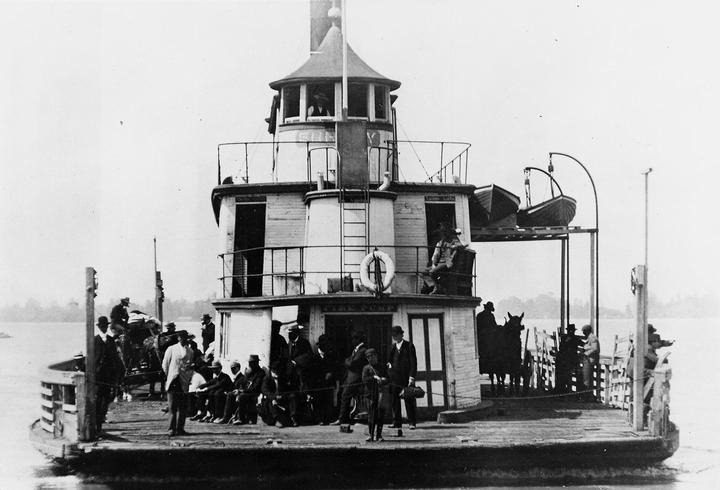
- Surrey

History
- Name: Surrey
- In service: 1891
- Out of service: 1904
- Fate: Abandoned

General characteristics
- Type: Ferry

Surrey was a steam-powered ferry operated on the Fraser River by the city of New Westminster, British Columbia, from 1891 to 1904. Her catamaran hulls had a paddlewheel mounted between them. She cost $25,000 to build.

She was equipped with water cannon, for fighting fires. However, when a fire was spotted in nearby Brownsville, the ship's captain was not able to board firefighters and proceed to the fire. Permission had first to be sought from her owners.

Once she proceeded the fire was quickly extinguished. It is believed this was the first use of a fireboat, in British Columbia.

For most of her career, Surrey ferried passengers from Surrey, South Westminster, Brownsville and New Westminster.

Surrey played a key role in preserving some of Surrey's waterfront buildings, during a large fire in 1898. Following the fire Surrey was given a $10,000 refit.

After the New Westminster Bridge was opened in 1904, she was retired, and put up for auction. She was purchased by North Vancouver, but proved too slow, and was abandoned.

Surrey had been retired by 1926, when a large fire struck a waterfront tannery in Surrey. She was thus unable to assist.
