= Agassiz-Rosedale Bridge =

Bridge on Highway 9 in southwestern British Columbia

- Coordinates: 49°12′22″N 121°46′37″W
- Carries: 2 lanes of Highway 9
- Crosses: Fraser River
- Locale: Agassiz, British Columbia
- Owner: British Columbia Ministry of Transportation and Infrastructure

Characteristics
- Design: Cantilever truss bridge
- Material: Steel
- Total length: 1,870 metres (6,130 ft)
- Longest span: 111 metres (365 ft)

History
- Designer: C.K. Saunders
- Constructed by: various
- Opened: 31 October 1956

Location
- Interactive map of Agassiz-Rosedale Bridge

The Agassiz–Rosedale Bridge is a cantilever truss bridge across the Fraser River in the Fraser Valley region of southwestern British Columbia. Linking Agassiz with the south shore, the two-lane bridge carrying BC Highway 9 is by road about 36 kilometres (22 mi) west of Hope, 119 kilometres (74 mi) east of Vancouver, and 51 kilometres (32 mi) east of Abbotsford.

== Former ferries ==
In earlier times, First Nations offered passenger travel across by canoe. In 1901, J. and M. Vallance and Walter McGrath, assisted by George Noble Ryder, commenced an on-request, seasonal ferry service using a rowboat, small scow, and horse. The southern dock, named "McGrath's Landing", remained the Rosedale terminal until 1922. In 1907, Charles A.P. Gill and G.N. Ryder replaced the service with a seven-hp launch and scow, providing subsidized daily and an on-call trips.

In 1909, Patrick McGrath and son Walter launched the 15-hp Lady Fraser. The next year Walter was awarded the government franchise for the crossing, ending the former enterprise. In 1914, he introduced a larger 30-hp launch and sold the former one. In 1917, a 7am–8pm free ferry service with a fixed subsidy was tendered, but Walter's bid was unsuccessful. After two other operators abandoned their contracts, Walter resumed the service a year later. Five round trips were made daily.

In 1920, tolls were introduced. In 1922, the government took over the service previously contracted to a private operator. The new ferry called Sea Wolf was nine-automobile capacity, 18 by 8 metres (60 by 26 ft), double ended, wooden hull, and powered by two 35-hp gasoline engines. A new toll structure and schedule were introduced for the five-times daily crossings.

Duke Patterson was the ferry captain 1922–1929, when a change of provincial government terminated his employment. G.N. Ryder was an assistant purser and deck hand throughout this period. In 1926–27, crew numbers were doubled for an extra weekend shift to handle increased traffic to the new Harrison Hot Springs Hotel. In early 1928, tolls increased and the site was relocated upstream to shorten the crossing distance from 671 metres (2,200 ft) to 213 metres (700 ft). That year, vandals almost destroyed the Agassiz floating wharf by attempting to set it adrift. The next year, the surplus Eena from Mission replaced the smaller Sea Wolf. In 1929–30, a new Agassiz landing was built.

Entering service in 1930, the new 20-automobile capacity ferry was called Agassiz. In 1932–33, this vessel was relocated to be the Ladner Ferry and was replaced by the Eena again. That year, J.T. Henley was awarded a five-year franchise for the service previously operated by the Department of Public Works.

In 1934, two 106-hp Ruston-Lister diesel engines replaced the 15-year-old 90-hp Wisconsin engines in the Eena. Although river ice suspended operations for brief periods each winter, the ice shutdown was January 27 to March 1 in 1937. In 1939–40, summer sailings were extended to 10pm.

In 1944 was the final charging of ferry tolls. In 1947–48 the Rosedale winter landing was reconstructed. When the June 1948 flood destroyed the Agassiz landing, a temporary floating one was installed.

In 1951, the surplus 20-automobile capacity Agassiz from Ladner was refitted and replaced the 10-automobile capacity Eena. The franchise charter was discontinued and the Department took over the operation. The ice shutdown was December 19, 1951 to February 13, 1952. In January 1954, 20 passengers were stranded for eight hours when the ferry lodged on a sand bank. Passengers either waded or scrambled over ladders to reach shore. The ferry was refloated the next day with the aid of tugs.

In June 1955, when floods damaged the Rosedale landing, heavy vehicles could not use the ferry for several weeks. After a span collapsed on the Mission railway/highway bridge in July, ferry hours increased to 16 hours, then 24 hours. In August, a new landing was improvised downstream.

The 24-hour service continued until the ferry ceased operations on October 31, 1956. Apart from the train and the westward road over Mt. Woodside opened in 1926, the ferry had provided the only access to Agassiz. Although the ferry had long been considered an unsuitable relic, a fear by many local businesses that easier access would threaten their livelihood became a reality.

The Agassiz was overhauled, new engines installed, and renamed the T'Lagunna and began service in June 1957 as the Albion Ferry.

== Bridge construction and opening ==
In 1954, contracts were awarded for the substructure to Northern Construction Co ($1,699,058), superstructure to Western Bridge & Steel Fabricators ($1,134,926), approaches to Dominion Bridge Company ($372,727), and steel fencing to Westminster Iron Works ($80,064). J.W. Stewart Limited is also listed as a contractor. C.K. Saunders was the design engineer. The 1,870-metre (6,130 ft) bridge cost about $4 million. Construction took more than two years.

Prior to the opening, residents were unhappy that a four-lane span had not been the chosen design. The bridge was officially opened on October 31, 1956. Premier W. A. C. Bennett cut the ribbon and Highways Minister Phil Gaglardi was emcee. Four days of festivities followed.

== Bridge operation ==
The single use toll was 50 cents, reduced to 25 cents for a book of tickets limited to a 30-day period. Months later, the bus and truck toll was reduced by 40 per cent for a book of 20 tickets. An automobile book of 10 tickets was later reduced to $2. The bridge became toll free from April 1, 1963.

In 1957, a 76-centimetre (30 in) natural gas pipeline was installed below the bridge deck.

In 1987, the bridge was a site location for the movie Stakeout.

In a 1993 head-on collision with a semi-trailer, the three occupants of a car were killed.

In a 2002 head-on collision, the two drivers were killed and a semi-trailer plunged into the river.

In 2019, the piers 7 and S1 foundations were joined as part of a seismic upgrade. The main channel of the river, which was closer to Agassiz in 1956, has since moved closer to Rosedale, which destabilised pier 7. In 2022, a further $25 million was budgeted for upgrades that include joint replacements, repairs to steel components, and a new coating for the steel to minimize deterioration. Maximum traffic capacity is projected by 2057. A 2012 recommendation to widen the bridge deck and create a safe space for pedestrians and cyclists is not being pursued. Since the bridge has never been safe to cross on foot or by bike, residents continued to lobby for action.

== See also ==
- List of crossings of the Fraser River
- List of Inland Ferries in British Columbia
- List of bridges in British Columbia
