= Khalsa Secondary School =

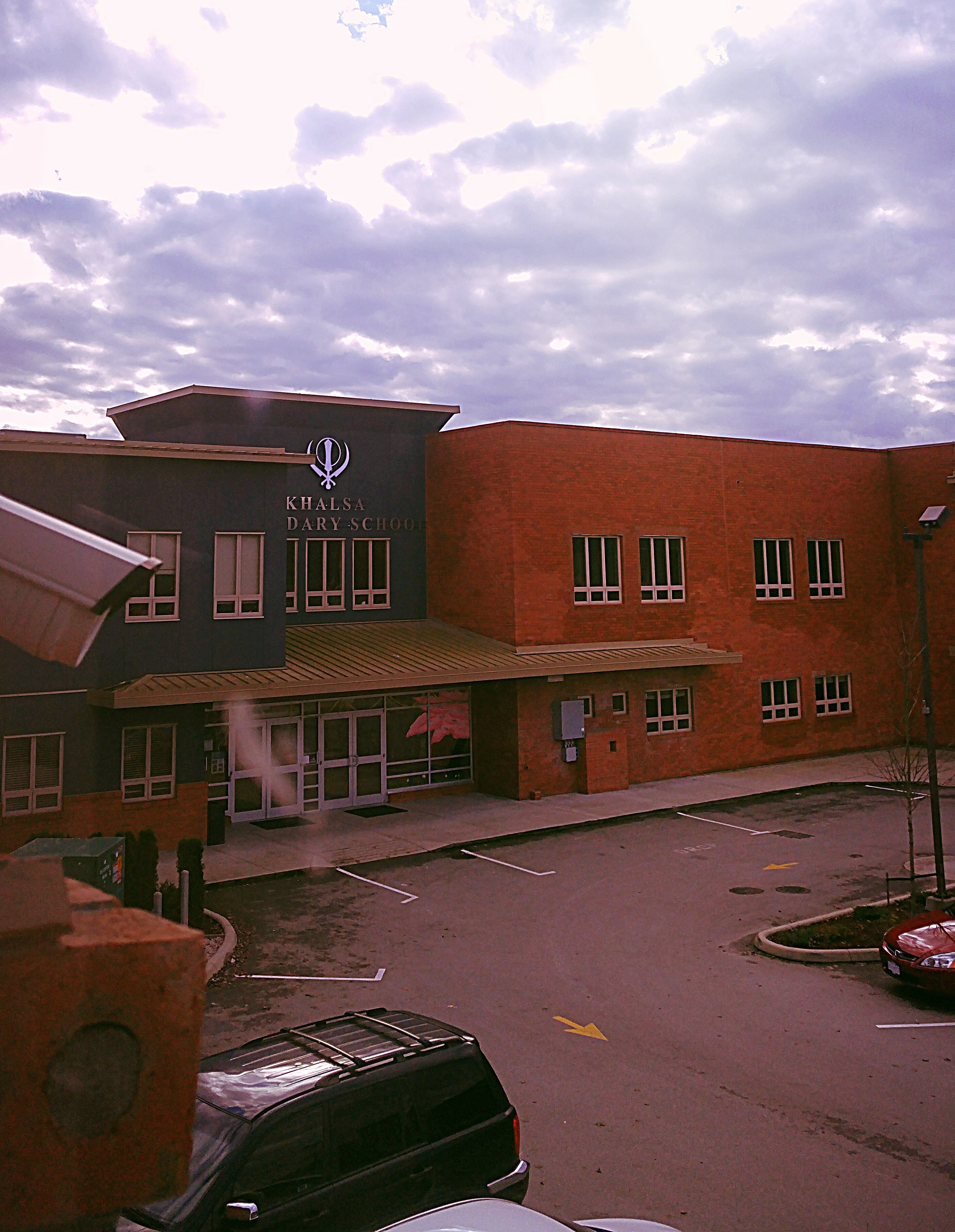
- Front entrance

Location
- 10589 124 Street; Surrey, British Columbia, V3B 0B1; Canada; 49.195115°N 122.880265°W

Information
- Type: Independent School
- Religious affiliation: Sikh
- Established: 2014
- School district: School District No. 36 (Surrey)
- Educational authority: Satnam Education Society of British Columbia
- Principal: Ms. Gurminder Malik
- Grades: 8 - 12
- Enrollment: 400
- Campus size: 38,640 sq ft.
- Colour: Blue
- Team name: Lions
- Website: khalsaschool.ca

Khalsa Secondary School is a private secondary school located in the South Westminster neighborhood of Surrey, British Columbia, Canada. The school is part of a network of Khalsa Schools in the Lower Mainland administered by the Satnam Education Society of British Columbia. Khalsa Secondary School is the first Sikh faith based high school in Canada.

== History ==
Khalsa Secondary School was established in 2014 by the Satnam Education Society of British Columbia. It is the first Sikh secondary school to open in Canada. The grand opening ceremony of the school was held on October 3, 2014. Construction of the building began in early 2013, across from the Khalsa School Old Yale Road campus. It was constructed in order to accommodate students in grade 8-12, who had previously been sharing the same facility as elementary school students in Khalsa School Old Yale Road and Khalsa School Newton. The establishment of the school also marked the first Grade 12 graduating class of Khalsa Secondary School in 2015. As of September 2018, there were 345 students enrolled in Khalsa Secondary. A scene from the Punjabi language film Aate Di Chidi was filmed at the school campus in 2018.

== Athletics ==
Khalsa Secondary School has a variety of sports teams that play under the name of Khalsa Lions. These include:

- Basketball
- Volleyball
- Soccer
- Track and Field
- Ultimate Frisbee

== Department of Religion ==
Alongside the academic curriculum, the Khalsa School Religious Department offers various classes relating to Sikhi and the Punjabi language. These classes include Kirtan, Gatka, Gurbani Santheya (study), and Gurmat philosophy.

== See also ==
- Sikhism in Canada
- Khalsa
