= Mission Bridge =

Bridge on Highway 11 in southwestern British Columbia

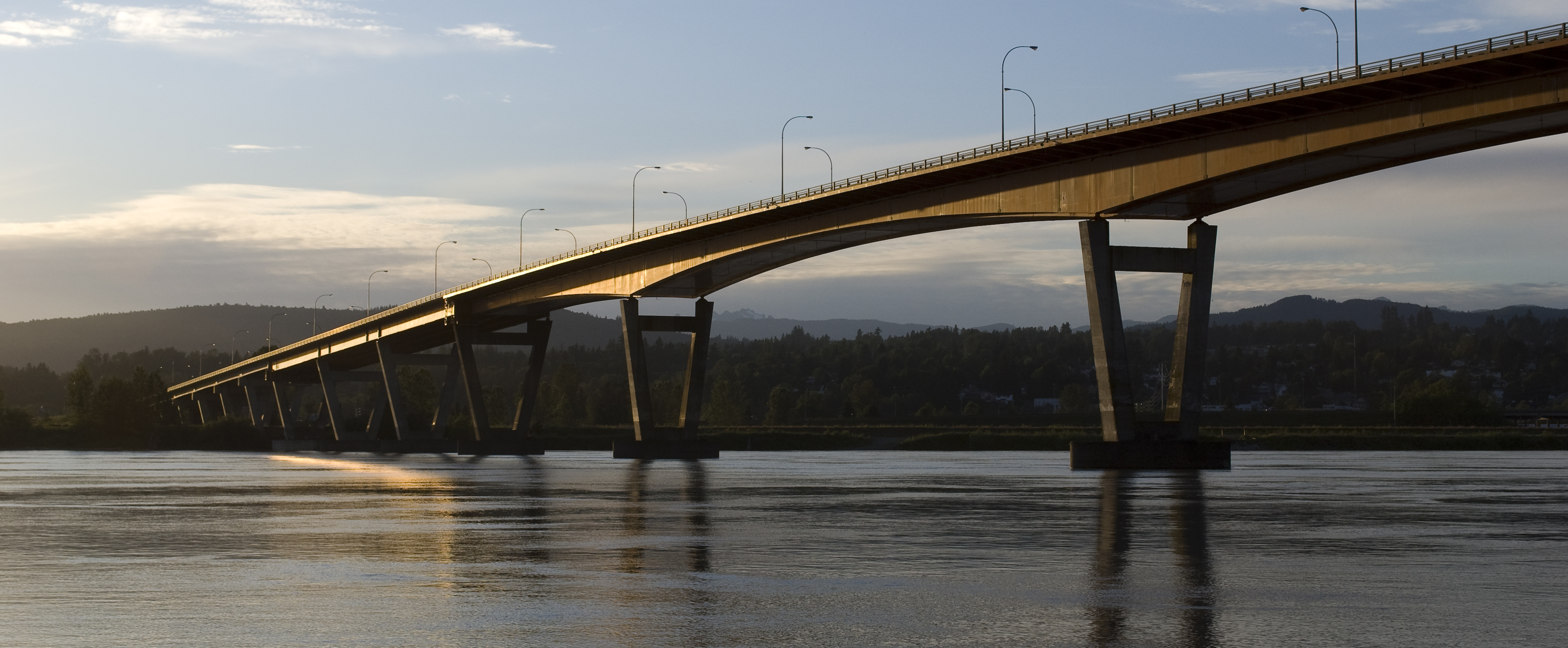
- Mission Bridge, 2010
- Coordinates: 49°07′24″N 122°18′20″W
- Carries: 4 lanes of Highway 11
- Crosses: Fraser River
- Locale: Mission and Abbotsford, British Columbia
- Owner: British Columbia Ministry of Transportation and Infrastructure
- Preceded by: Mission Railway Bridge

Characteristics
- Design: Girder bridge
- Material: Steel and concrete
- Total length: 1,126 metres (3,695 ft)
- Width: ≈ 20 metres (66 ft)
- Longest span: ≈ 120 metres (390 ft)
- No. of spans: 20
- Piers in water: 8
- No. of lanes: 4

History
- Construction start: Mar 1969
- Construction end: Jun 1973
- Opened: 23 Jun 1973
- Inaugurated: 7 Jul 1973

The Mission Bridge is a steel and concrete girder bridge across the Fraser River in the Fraser Valley region of southwestern British Columbia, Canada. Linking the City Of Mission and the City of Abbotsford, the four-lane structure carries BC Highway 11.

== Ferry era ==
In May 1911, tenders were called for a new ferry service immediately southwest of the Canadian Pacific Railway (CP) bridge. At the time, the south shore was called Elliotville, settled by William Elliott. The double decked ferry, which could carry six teams of horse-drawn units and passengers, was gasoline powered. Launched in early November, the John H. Sprott commenced the Mission–Elliotville service about two weeks later. Toll-free 7am–6pm, a charge was made for after hours crossings. Sprott was a pioneer roadbuilder in the district.

The schedule was hourly each way, six days a week. By summer 1913, the service was 7am–5pm, seven days a week. By 1915, the ferry was about hourly 8am–7pm on Sundays, and every 40 minutes 7am–7pm on other days. In 1917, a team of horses, buggy, and two occupants, plunged from the landing into the river. One horse was lost and the buggy slightly damaged. Later that year, winter hours were reduced.

The inconvenience of a 40-minutes frequency prompted lobbying for a bridge. In 1919–20, the contracts awarded for a replacement vessel comprised the steel hull to Yarrows Ltd ($31,000) and engine to Westminster Iron Works ($10,080). In summer 1920, the Eena entered service. Ferry fares may have been introduced at that time. Responding to complaints, fares were reduced months later.

In 1921, the ferry captain was inexplicably terminated. By 1923, the schedule was 9am–5pm, being hourly in winter and every 40 minutes in summer. The ferry ceased operations on July 1, 1927. In 1929, the surplus Eena was relocated to be the Agassiz-Rosedale ferry.

== Shared railway bridge era ==
After the new Mission Railway Bridge opened, CP rejected a request in 1910 for public use by wagon traffic. Dual railway/highway use eventuated on July 1, 1927. Planks laid alongside the rails were attached to lengthened ties, which allowed single lane motor vehicle traffic. In July 1955, when a span of the bridge collapsed, no users were injured, but the vital commercial link between the two communities was disrupted. High water had washed away the foundations of a concrete pier. A 27-metre (90 ft), 20-automobile capacity ferry barge was immediately installed for passengers and vehicles, operating 7am–midnight. An additional tug and barge were used the following summer to handle the heavy traffic and agricultural produce. Ferry services ceased in August 1956 when the bridge reopened. In 1970, a major fire on the centre span of the bridge weakened the deck requiring a period of closure. In 1972, a passenger ferry operated for five days while the bridge was closed to replace railway ties. Seasonal flooding would also put the bridge out of commission at times.

== Highway bridge construction and opening ==
The 1,126-metre (3,695 ft) bridge comprises a 16-metre (54 ft) wide roadway bordered by 2-metre (6 ft) wide sidewalks. CBA Engineering designed the bridge and oversaw the $15 million project. The superstructure approaches are either concrete or steel I-girders and the main river spans are stiffened steel box girders, comprising a total of 20 spans, 11 piers on land, and 8 in the river.

In 1968, the contract for the piers and abutments was awarded to Northern Construction Co and J.W. Stewart ($2,711,000), with work beginning in March 1969. By September, five land piers were complete and the foundations for four more poured. The dredging of fill for the overpass approaches was awarded to Sceptre Dredging ($169,500).

In 1970–71, the fabrication and erection of structural steelwork was awarded to Canron Ltd ($1,038,450) and the supply and placement of fill for roadworks to Sceptre Dredging ($1,306,692). By mid-1971, the substructure was complete, as was the dredging of material from the bottom of the river for approach fills, but the shaping of the approaches took a further two months. In September, the placing of the concrete beams began. These light-weight post-tensioned beams were produced on site. In 1971–72, the steelwork for the main superstructure was awarded to Canron Ltd ($2,145,475) and the concrete girders and deck approach spans was awarded to Peter Kiewitt Sons ($1,619,922). By mid-1972, the steelwork for the approaches was erected and for the main spans was progressing.

Canron, which prefabricated the 13 structural steel sections that form the box girders of the three main spans, barged these modules from its Vancouver yard to site. Each were up to 30 metres (100 ft) long and weighed up to 200 tons. That July, the 24-ton floating Manitowac crane hoisted the first section, which was 13 metres (44 ft) long, 13 metres (42 ft) wide, and 6 metres (20 ft) deep, and weighed 150 tons. After being lifted 21 metres (70 ft), it was placed into position on the north centre pier.

During final completion, the deck was the seal coated with an epoxy resin base, and the specific pavement formulation, which had been chosen based on extensive testing, was laid.

Whereas the first contract was let in late 1968, the projected completion date moved from fall 1971, to summer 1972, to May 1973, and to June 1973. On June 23, the bridge opened to traffic. After four and a half years of construction, Premier Dave Barrett officially opened the bridge on July 7. The ceremony, which 1,500 people attended, included a parade of vintage vehicles and police cruisers, brass bands, jets flying past, and military personnel parachuting onto the deck from low-flying aircraft.

== Highway bridge operation ==
Plaques at both ends state the official name as the Mission Bridge. The former dual railway/highway bridge was often called the Mission–Matsqui Bridge. The current bridge has been referred to as the Matsqui–Mission Bridge, the Abbotsford–Mission Bridge, or the Mission–Abbotsford Bridge.

In November 1973, large lampposts were installed. That year, BC Gas installed a 20-centimetre (8 in) diameter natural gas pipeline below the bridge deck. Renamed Terasen Gas, the company applied in 2006 to replace the line with a 30-centimetre (12 in) one placed beneath the river, but the application was denied.

In 1977, a passenger ferry operated for several days while the bridge was closed for repairs.

Apparently, the original bridge design included no-posts along the median, but this safety device was not installed. Three fatalities and 26 injuries occurred from accidents during 1987–1988. In 2005, following four head-on collision deaths in four years, a median barrier was fitted.

During 2010–2015, a $21 million six-phase seismic retrofit was undertaken, which included the strengthening of the columns and beams, a new seismic restraint system, new deck joints, painting of various components, and slope stabilization. Higher cycle railings were also provided for safety.

In August 2021, three days of emergency repairs required partial and complete closures to restore a bridge bearing.

== See also ==
- List of crossings of the Fraser River
- List of Inland Ferries in British Columbia
- List of bridges in British Columbia
