= British Columbia Highway 11 =

Highway in British Columbia, Canada

Highway 11
- Abbotsford-Mission Highway; Sumas Way
- Highway 11 highlighted in red.

Route information
- Maintained by the Ministry of Transportation and Infrastructure
- Length: 17 km (11 mi)
- Existed: 1958–present

Major junctions
- South end: SR 9 at the U.S. border in Huntingdon
- Highway 1 (TCH) in Abbotsford
- North end: Highway 7 in Mission

Location
- Country: Canada
- Province: British Columbia
- Major cities: Abbotsford, Mission

Highway system
- British Columbia provincial highways
| ← Highway 10 | → Highway 12 |

Highway 11, known locally as the Abbotsford–Mission Highway and Sumas Way, is a 17-kilometre (11 mi) long at-grade expressway (With the southernmost part of the highway two lanes) that figuratively cuts the Fraser Valley in half. The highway was first given the '11' designation in 1958, and it originally followed South Fraser Way through Abbotsford, being re-routed onto the four-lane Sumas Way in the mid-1980s. Highway 11 originally entered Mission over the same bridge that carries a spur of the Canadian Pacific Railway across the Fraser River, but it was re-routed onto its own bridge, the Mission Bridge, in 1973.

== Route details ==
In the south, Highway 11 begins at the Huntingdon Canada–US border crossing, where it connects with Washington State Route 9. The highway goes north for 3.4 kilometres (2.1 mi) to its junction with Highway 1. North of Highway 1, the route travels 3.7 km (2.3 mi) north, passing through two interchanges, before arriving at an intersection with Gladys Road. Highway 11 is facing west at this point, so it turns right onto its own dedicated route. Highway 11 from this point proceeds north for 10 km (6 mi). It passes through the community of Matsqui and an interchange into Matsqui's centre, then crosses the Fraser River over the Mission Bridge into Mission, where it terminates at its junction with Highway 7.

== History ==
Highway 11 has been realigned several times since it was first designated in 1958. Until the Mission Bridge was completed in 1973, traffic crossing the Fraser River used a nearby railway bridge. Traffic continued to use Riverside Street until a new alignment and railway overhead was completed in 1979 or 1980. Once the highway crossed the Fraser, the highway turned towards Horne Street, along the present day Horne Street Connector. The current alignment opened in 1984 when a $6.7 million (equivalent to $16.42 million in 2022) route and overpass across the Canadian Pacific tracks opened. North from Abbotsford, the highway met Harris Road at a T-intersection and turned westwards, before turning north again at Riverside Street, continuing until it met the Trans-Canada Trail dyke at the Fraser River. Once over the bridge, the highway ran along Harbour Avenue and subsequently northwards along Horne Avenue towards the split Lougheed Highway.

In Abbotsford, both Gladys Avenue and Railway Avenue were both a part of the highway until the present expressway bypass was opened around late 1986 or early 1987.

The two interchanges on the north side and the CPR overhead were built after the Mission Bridge. The trumpet interchange leading to Horne Avenue was constructed before the CPR overhead, which was completed around 1984. The interchange with London Avenue was completed in November 1998. In 2013, the project of Highway 11 widening at the south end of the Sumas Border to Vye Road was announced. Construction began in June 2021 which was completed in December 2023. It includes an extension of the Nexus lane to reduce travel times and improve safety.

In 2026, it was announced that as a part of Phase 3B of the Highway 1 widening project, an additional Highway 11 Interchange Project would see additional improvements to highway 11, including the second diverging diamond interchange in BC at highway 1 (the second in BC after 264th Street in Langley, also part of the widening project), upgrades to the intersections at Marshal Road and Delair Road, new truck parking and improved active transportation.

== Major intersections ==
For south to north. The entire route is in Fraser Valley Regional District.

| Location | km | mi | Destinations | Notes |
|---|---|---|---|---|
| Abbotsford | 0.00 | 0.00 | SR 9 south – Sumas, Bellingham | Continues into Washington |
| Abbotsford | 0.00 | 0.00 | Canada – United States border at Sumas–Huntingdon Border Crossing | |
| Abbotsford | 3.44 | 2.14 | Highway 1 (TCH) – Vancouver, Hope | Interchange (Highway 1 exit 92) |
| Abbotsford | 4.30 | 2.67 | South Fraser Way – Abbotsford City Centre | |
| Abbotsford | 4.99 | 3.10 | Old Yale Road | Interchange; no southbound exit |
| Abbotsford | 6.09 | 3.78 | Old Clayburn Road | Interchange |
| Abbotsford | 7.12 | 4.42 | Gladys Avenue – Abbotsford City Centre | |
| Abbotsford | 13.76 | 8.55 | Riverside Street | Interchange; southbound exit and northbound entrance |
| Abbotsford–Mission boundary | 14.39– 15.53 | 8.94– 9.65 | Mission Bridge over the Fraser River | |
| Mission | 15.73 | 9.77 | Horne Street Connector (Highway 901:0670 / Highway 901:0671) to Highway 7 east – Mission City Centre, Agassiz | Interchange; southbound exit via London Avenue exit; Highway 915:0670 is unsigned |
| Mission | 16.52 | 10.27 | London Avenue – Industrial Park | Interchange |
| Mission | 17.11 | 10.63 | Highway 7 (Lougheed Highway) – Vancouver, Maple Ridge, Agassiz, Harrison Hot Springs Cedar Valley Connector to Cedar Street | |
1.000 mi = 1.609 km; 1.000 km = 0.621 mi: Incomplete access; Route transition
