= Thornton Tunnel =

- Interactive map of Thornton Tunnel

Overview
- Line: CN North Shore Industrial Line
- Location: Burnaby, British Columbia
- Coordinates: 49°16′46″N 123°01′06″W
- Status: Active
- Crosses: Willingdon Heights, Burnaby Heights, Hastings–Sunrise

Operation
- Opened: May 6, 1969
- Traffic: Railway
- Character: Primarily freight service

Technical
- Length: 3.4 kilometres (2.1 mi)
- No. of tracks: Single
- Track gauge: 4 ft 8 1/2 in (1,435 mm) standard gauge

The Thornton Tunnel (also known as Thornton Rail Tunnel) is a freight railway tunnel in Burnaby, British Columbia, running under the Willingdon Heights and Vancouver Heights neighbourhoods.

== History ==
On April 29, 1965, the Canadian National Railway (CNR) publicly announced that it would undertake a CA$27 million infrastructure expansion project in the Greater Vancouver area to handle new, out-of-province customers planning to use shipping terminals on the North Shore of the Burrard Inlet. It included the construction of a new rail yard in North Vancouver and doubling the size of a marshalling yard in Port Mann, Surrey to make it the CNR's primary yard in the Lower Mainland. In addition, construction would include a new $8.5 million, single-track railway bridge over the Burrard Inlet, and a $10 million, 3.2-kilometre (2 mi), north-south single-track railway tunnel in Northeast Vancouver from the new bridge to near the Lougheed Highway to connect directly with CNR's main line track. The entire project was expected to be completed by January 1970. The bridge would replace the original Second Narrows Bridge, which CNR purchased a few months earlier for $1.

The tunnel would allow CNR to bypass the existing, meandering route from the Fraser River west through central Vancouver and east along the South Shore of the Burrard Inlet before crossing into North Vancouver. This change reduced the route length between the Fraser River Bridge and the Second Narrows Bridge by 11 kilometres (7 mi), most of which was along congested tracks owned by other railroads, and it would avoid CNR's rail yard near downtown Vancouver. To reduce the number of times the bridge would need to be opened for marine traffic, the deck of the new Second Narrows rail bridge was higher than the original bridge. However, the change of deck height meant that the new bridge and the north entrance of the tunnel were higher than the tracks previously used to access the bridge from the South Shore, which meant that there would no longer be a direct connection between the main line tracks of the Canadian Pacific Railway (CPR) and the Second Narrows rail bridge.

Construction on the tunnel began in June 1966. By March 1968, the cost of the entire project increased to $32 million, and the tunnel portion now cost $11 million, but diggers from both ends of the tunnel had broken through to complete the boring segment of construction. The rails used in the tunnel were manufactured in Winnipeg, Manitoba, where they were welded into eight 416-metre (1,365 ft) sections and transported to the tunnel cross-country by freight rail. By August 1968, the entire tunnel was nearing completion.

On May 6, 1969, the new bridge and tunnel opened for service. However, after several years the tunnel itself began to be regarded as a source of congestion. By 2018, the Second Narrows Bridge, the Thornton Tunnel, and the New Westminster Bridge were considered the three major bottlenecks in the Vancouver area for all railways.

== Description ==
The tunnel is 3.4 kilometres (2.1 mi) long, and it is a single-track railway. The maximum speed limit in the tunnel is 16 kilometres per hour (10 mph). The tunnel is named after Sir Henry Worth Thornton, who was an early president of CNR. CNR designated the branch line containing the tunnel and bridge as the Thornton Branch.

In the middle of the tunnel there is a fake house to cover up a ventilation shaft and fan systems and blend into a residential neighbourhood. It is located on the northeast corner of Frances Street and Ingleton Avenue, in Burnaby. The ventilation system originally cleared the exhaust from a passing train within 20 minutes so that the next train would have enough oxygen to safely enter the tunnel. An upgrade project to reduce the ventilation delay from 20 minutes to 10 minutes was completed in May 2022.
