= Bridgeview, Surrey =

Bridgeview
- Neighbourhood of Surrey
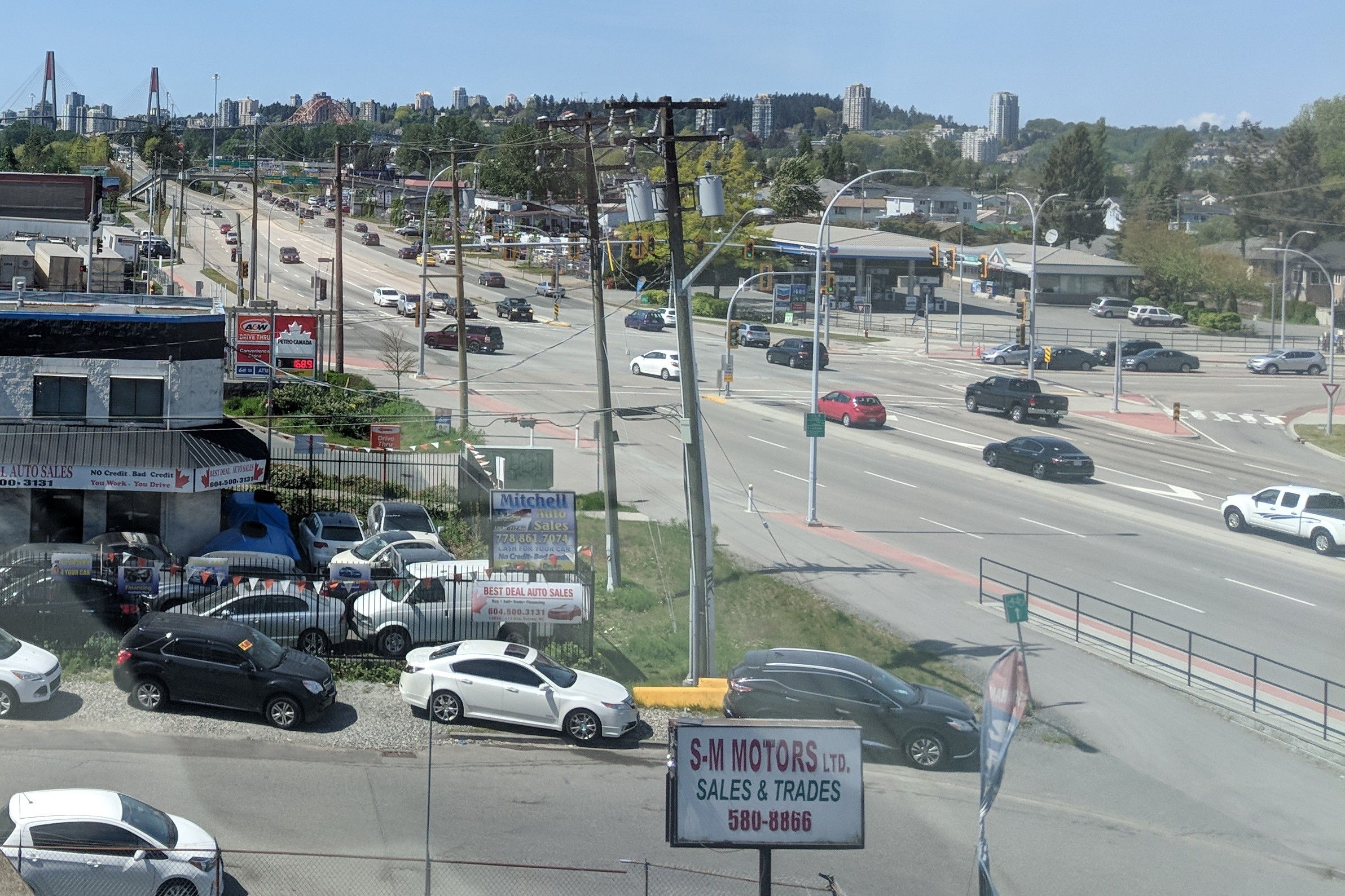
- Looking northwest from Scott Road station

- Location within Metro Vancouver
- Coordinates: 49°12′33″N 122°52′03″W
- Country: Canada
- Province: British Columbia
- Region: Lower Mainland
- Regional district: Metro Vancouver
- Town centre: Whalley

Government
  - Mayor: Doug McCallum
  - MP (Fed.): Randeep Sarai (Liberal)
  - MLA (Prov.): Bruce Ralston (NDP)
- Time zone: UTC−8 (PST)
  - Summer (DST): UTC−7 (PDT)

Bridgeview is a neighbourhood in the Whalley town centre of Surrey, British Columbia, Canada, that stretches south from the Fraser River to King George Boulevard. The neighbourhood consists of all the low-lying area between the Port Mann Bridge in the east and the Pattullo Bridge in the west.

== History ==
In the 1970s, dykes were constructed to prevent the neighbourhood from flooding. Water levels from prior floods had reached 8.9 m (29 ft) and 7.6 m (25 ft) in 1894 and 1948, respectively.

Residents of the neighbourhood fought the municipality of Surrey in the mid-1970s to build proper sewers as septic tanks would often overflow into drainage ditches. Then-mayor Bill Vander Zalm and other municipal councillors resisted the idea as the municipality had industrial plans for the area.

== Transportation ==
Bridgeview is served by Scott Road station of Metro Vancouver's SkyTrain rapid transit system. The station is located in the portion of South Westminster which borders the southern edge of Bridgeview, at the interchange between King George Boulevard and Scott Road.
