= Mission Railway Bridge =

Railway bridge across the Fraser River in British Columbia, Canada

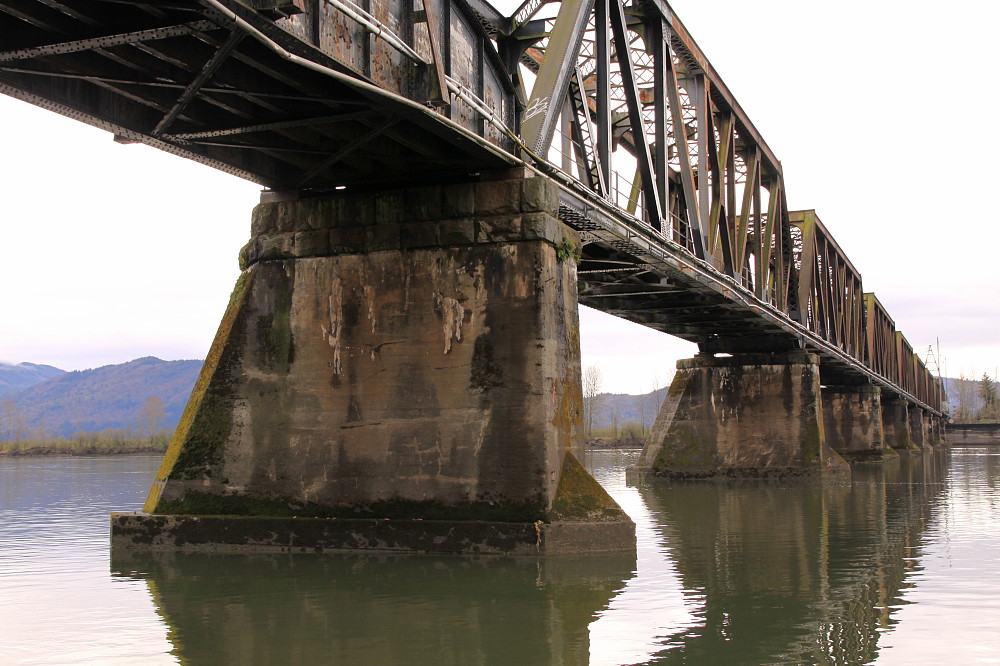
- Coordinates: 49°07′33″N 122°18′00″W
- Carries: Trains (shared with automobiles between 1927 and 1973)
- Crosses: Fraser River
- Locale: Between Mission, BC, and Abbotsford, BC
- Owner: Canadian Pacific Kansas City

Characteristics
- Design: Swing bridge
- Total length: 533 m (1,749 ft)
- Longest span: 70 m (230 ft)
- No. of spans: 10
- Clearance below: 4.9 m (16 ft)

Rail characteristics
- No. of tracks: 1

History
- Construction end: 1909

Statistics
- Daily traffic: 31 freight trains (2026 projection); 50 freight trains (2030 projection)

Location
- Interactive map of Mission Railway Bridge

The Mission Railway Bridge is a Canadian Pacific Kansas City (CPKC) bridge spanning the Fraser River between Mission and Abbotsford, British Columbia, Canada.

Replacing an earlier bridge built in 1891, which was the first and only bridge crossing of the Fraser below Siska in the Fraser Canyon until the construction of the New Westminster rail bridge in 1904, it was constructed in 1909 by the Canadian Pacific Railway (CPR). The Mission Railway Bridge is supported by 13 concrete piers and is approximately 533 metres (1,749 ft) in length. Before completion of the Mission highway bridge, highway traffic to and from Matsqui and Abbotsford with Mission used the bridge as a one-way alternating route, with traffic lights at either end to control direction. Rail traffic often held up car crossings, causing very lengthy waits, which were a part of daily life in the Central Valley until the new bridge was completed.

Beneath the bridge's north abutment is an important river-level gauge monitored during the annual Fraser freshet. The bridge is also the location of the end of the Fraser's tidal bore: downstream from the bridge the river is increasingly influenced by tidal influences from the Georgia Strait.

The bridge has a speed limit of 10 kilometres per hour (6.2 miles per hour).

== Swing span ==
The Mission Railway Bridge has a swing span, which has a vertical clearance of 4.9 metres (16 ft) above the water when closed. The swing span is fitted atop a cylindrical concrete pier, the tenth from the north bank of the river. This pier is protected from shipping traffic by two 46-metre wood piers (151 ft) extending upstream and downstream, respectively, perpendicular to the bridge which are tapered at both ends. The navigation channel past the bridge is 30 metres (98 ft) in width. At night, a fixed white light is displayed on piers 9 and 11 as well as at the upriver and downriver ends of the protection pier.

The majority of marine traffic consists of log tows and gravel barges, which are permitted to use the navigation channel beneath the fixed span between piers 5 and 6. The swing span is used for wood chip barges and other vessels which cannot navigate beneath the span between piers 5 and 6.

CPKC maintains a bridge tender 24 hours per day at an office on the north bank of the bridge. Vessels requesting passage through the swing span contact the bridge tender on marine VHF radio, whereby the tender walks the bridge to a control booth on the swing span.

== Usage ==
Although the Mission Railway Bridge is not a part of the nearby CPKC main line, it has important roles in preserving and increasing the capacity of the British Columbia rail network. The bridge is at the southern endpoint of the 249-kilometre Fraser Canyon (155 mi) directional running zone (DRZ). The DRZ converts the bidirectional, mostly single-track transcontinental main lines of CPKC and Canadian National Railway (CN) into a pair of one-way railways that run in opposite directions. The CPKC and CN main lines are primarily on opposite sides of the Fraser River and Thompson River throughout the DRZ, exchanging sides at the Cisco Bridges in Siska. Loaded trains carrying freight for export to the Port of Vancouver run southbound (westbound) through Matsqui/Abbotsford on the flatter CN line near the eastern bank of the river. Empty trains and lighter cargo (intermodal containers and automobiles) go back northbound (eastbound) through Mission on the hillier CPKC line near the western bank of the river. Northbound CN trains leaving the Greater Vancouver area cross the bridge to join the CPKC tracks in the Fraser Canyon, while southbound CPKC trains use the CN tracks in the Fraser Canyon before crossing the bridge to rejoin the CPKC tracks heading toward Greater Vancouver. This arrangement more than triples the train capacity over the Fraser Canyon corridor.

The Mission Railway Bridge also experiences increased usage because of the co-production agreement between CPKC and CN to improve traffic flows around the Port of Vancouver. The agreement seeks to reduce capacity pressures at the New Westminster Bridge, and to avoid increases in Greater Vancouver rail traffic caused by freight interchanges at New Westminster Yard and the rail yards in Sapperton and Vancouver. Instead of using those smaller yards, interchange occurs between CPKC's Coquitlam Yard in Port Coquitlam and CN's Thornton Yard in Port Mann, Surrey, which are the companies' primary rail yards in the Vancouver metropolitan area. The normal route between Coquitlam Yard and Thornton Yard is to run a short distance westbound to the New Westminster Bridge, and then continue another short distance eastbound on the other side of the Fraser River to the other company's yard. However, the co-production agreement has interswitching trains making a longer detour. An interswitching train travels about 40 kilometres (25 mi) on its company's main line eastbound to cross the Fraser River at the Mission Railway Bridge, and then runs about that same amount of distance on the other company's main line westbound to that company's yard.

== See also ==
- List of crossings of the Fraser River
- List of bridges in Canada
- List of road-rail bridges

== Bibliography ==
- Cambie, H. J. (December 27, 1890). "Fraser River bridge. Canadian Pacific Railway, Mission branch". Transactions of the Canadian Society of Civil Engineers (published October 22, 1891). hdl:2027/aeu.ark:/13960/t3126hf5b – via HathiTrust.
