= Huntingdon, Abbotsford =

Coordinates: 49°00′00″N 122°16′00″W

Huntingdon is a community within Abbotsford, British Columbia, Canada. It is located immediately north of the Canada–US border, and is the location of the Sumas–Huntingdon Border Crossing. The main road through the community is Highway 11. The name of the community is also the present name of the border crossing connecting to Sumas, Washington.

It is named for Collis P. Huntington, a Union Pacific Railroad railway executive who helped connect the Canadian Pacific Railway line to US Lines. The CPR wanted direct BC connection to Seattle, south, and onto California so it built a bridge at Mission and rail line across Matsqui Prairie to connect with the Seattle, Lake Shore and Eastern Railway. The Northern Pacific Railway, Union Pacific Railroad and Milwaukee Roads built lines to Sumas, with an eye of coming to Vancouver, but never crossed the border in the end. BC Electric Railway and Great Northern did build to Huntingdon and into the eastern Fraser Valley.

== See also ==
- Sumas, British Columbia (District of Sumas until 1972)
