= Qayqayt =

Indigenous community in British Columbia, Canada

Qayqayt (Hunʼqumiʼnum: qiqéyt; pronounced ka-kite) was the name of an indigenous community located in the Brownsville area of Surrey, British Columbia. The community was part of the Kwantlen and Musqueam First Nations. It was used as a site for fishing by many different First Nations, including the Kwantlen, Musqueam, Squamish, Katzie, Kwikwetlem, Semiahmoo, Tsleil-waututh, and Tsawwassen.

The community's name is said to mean "resting place". Though the term 'resting place' is used euphemistically to refer to the pre-contact Coast Salish funeral rights. In Hunʼqumiʼnum, 'qay' refers to death and dying, and a replication of the word describes the process of dying. This is possibly an allusion to the tree burials at ancient Qayqayt – with tree burials, the deceased person was placed in a wooden coffin in a tree. This allowed the elements to decay the body and reduce it to bones. Once the body was reduced to bones, the funeral box was taken down and placed in mausoleum-like structures, many of which were noted to be at Qayqayt.

The Journals of Simon Fraser show that he made first contact at Qayqayt on July 2, 1808. There he met Whattlekainum, a wealthy Tsawwassen man, who had married into the Kwantlen. After a dispute with residents of Qayqayt over a stolen item, Fraser kicked a young man from the village. An uproar ensued and the men of the village banded together to kill Fraser and his party in retribution. However, Whattlekainum used his vast wealth to convince the men not to kill Fraser, and had him escorted out of the territory and back up river.

The community slowly declined in the early 20th century as the land was disrupted by construction of the Pattullo Bridge. By 1960, both the Musqueam and Kwantlen reserves at Qayqayt were sold.
