= Sumas–Huntingdon Border Crossing =

Border crossing between Canada and the United States

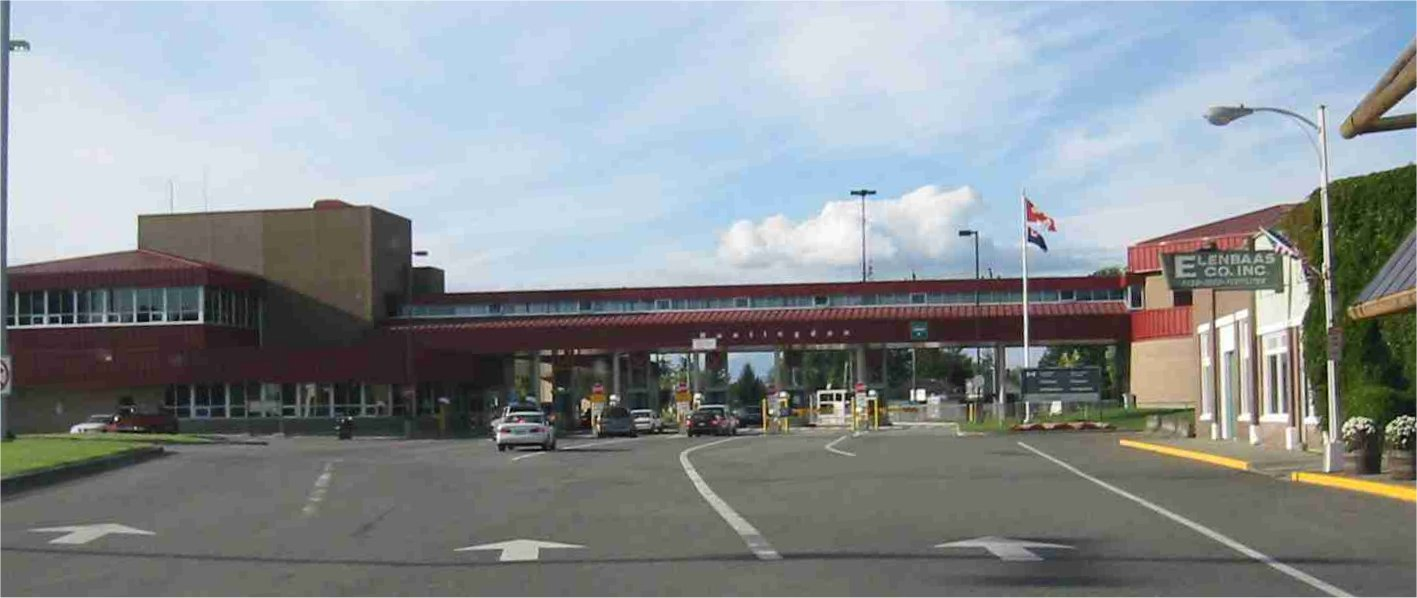
- The Canada border inspection station at Huntingdon, British Columbia

Location
- Country: United States; Canada
- Location: SR 9 / Highway 11; US Port: 103 Cherry Street, Sumas, Washington; Canadian Port: 2 Sumas Way, Huntingdon, British Columbia
- Coordinates: 49°00′09″N 122°15′56″W

Details
- Opened: 1891

Website
- US Canadian

The Sumas–Huntingdon Border Crossing connects Sumas, Washington and Abbotsford, British Columbia on the Canada–US border. Washington State Route 9 on the American side joins British Columbia Highway 11 on the Canadian side.

== Terrain ==
The crossing has been important since this part of the border was delineated in 1846, but it would be several more decades before settlements were established on both sides of the border. The level terrain made an ideal crossing for both roadways and railroads. The flat land has been prone to frequent flooding.

== Canadian side ==
In the late 1850s, the Fraser Canyon Gold Rush drew numerous prospectors from south of the border. The police reported that goods were freely entering BC without any means to collect the respective duties. John Musselwhite, the first customs officer, served at Upper Sumas from around 1890. Based about 20 kilometres (12 mi) northeast of the present crossing, he operated from his private dwelling. T. Fraser York, his successor in 1893, assumed this part-time position. In 1912, York was transferred to the Port of Abbotsford, established that year. The Port of New Westminster administered Upper Sumas until the latter closed in 1918.

Canada established a border station at Huntingdon in 1896, also administered by New Westminster. In 1912, Huntingdon closed as an office but became an outpost for Abbotsford, which itself was housed in a room of the Canadian Pacific Railway (CP) station. In 1932, the Abbotsford office closed, and the Huntingdon outpost transferred to New Westminster oversight. In 1948, the status was elevated to Port of Huntingdon.

Canada built a concrete border station at Huntingdon in the 1930s, and replaced it with a brick facade structure in a style similar to the current facility at Carway, Alberta in the mid-1950s. This structure was replaced by the current twin-wing facility in 1992. In 2012, a new NEXUS lane opened. The NEXUS lane was later extended by 1.3 kilometres (0.81 mi) in 2021–2023 to reduce travel times and increase safety.

In 2020, flooding occurred on the British Columbia side and this closed the crossing in both directions.

Officially called "Abbotsford–Huntingdon", the CBSA office is open 24 hours per day.

== US side ==
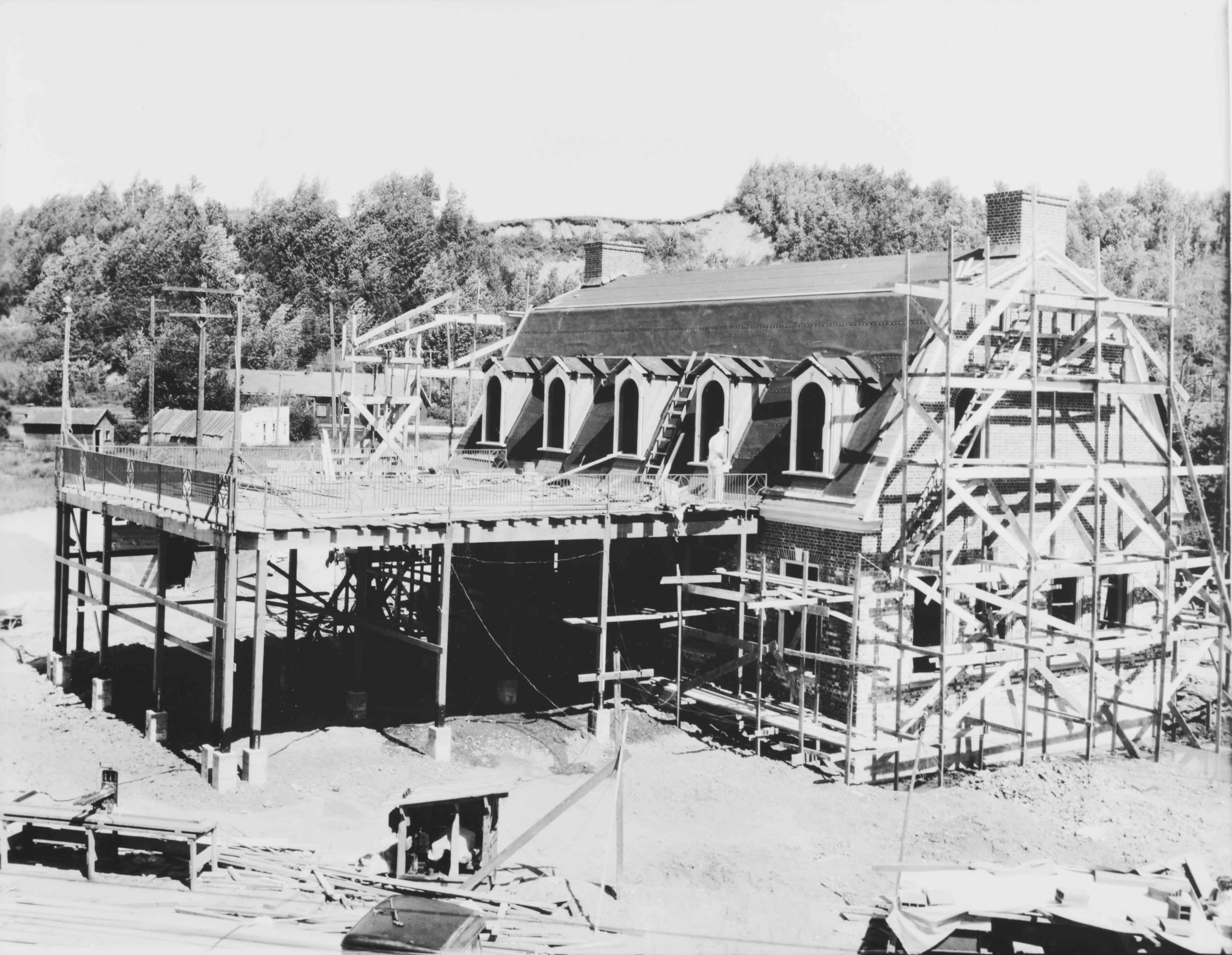
The Sumas Border Inspection Station under construction, 1932

During the goldrush, a pack-trail through the tall timber was known as the Whatcom Road or Whatcom Trail. In 1891, the Bellingham Bay and British Columbia Railroad reached the border and connected with CP. The crossing quickly became a popular smuggling route, especially for Chinese wishing to illegally enter the US, and contraband, such as opium and diamonds. That year, J.F. Flanagan became the inaugural customs officer at Sumas.

From 1907, the US rented a building for customs purposes. The road through Huntingdon was relocated in 1913, leaving the customs office poorly positioned. US Customs built a new border station on the east side of Cherry Street in 1914, and rented part of it out as an automotive repair shop. In 1932, as traffic continued to grow, and in response to smuggling during Prohibition, the border station was again upgraded.

In 1949, the operating hours at Sumas were expanded to 24 hours. The building was large and ornate, but when it became inadequate in 1988, a fourth Sumas border station was planned. Rather than demolishing the historic building, the 714-ton brick building was moved intact to 131 Harrison Street, where it stands today. Construction on the current US border station was completed in February 1990.

The crossing remains open 24 hours per day.

== See also ==
- List of Canada–United States border crossings
