= Ironworkers Memorial Second Narrows Crossing =

Steel-truss bridge across Burrard Inlet in British Columbia, Canada

Ironworkers Memorial Bridge
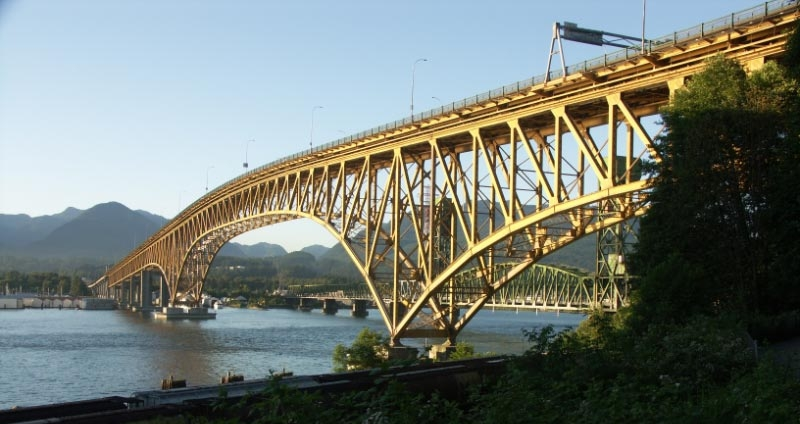
- Coordinates: 49.295296°N 123.026276°W
- Carries: Six lanes of British Columbia Highway 1, pedestrians and bicycles
- Crosses: Burrard Inlet
- Locale: Vancouver; District of North Vancouver
- Official name: Ironworkers Memorial Second Narrows Crossing
- Owner: British Columbia Ministry of Transportation and Infrastructure

Characteristics
- Design: Truss/cantilever bridge
- Material: Steel
- Total length: 1,292 metres (4,239 ft)
- Longest span: 335 metres (1,099 ft)

History
- Designer: Swan, Wooster and Partners
- Constructed by: Peter Kiewet and Sons, Raymond International, and Dominion Bridge Company
- Construction start: 1957
- Opened: August 25, 1960

Statistics
- Daily traffic: 130,700 (2026)

Location
- Interactive map of Ironworkers Memorial Bridge

The Ironworkers Memorial Second Narrows Crossing, also called the Ironworkers Memorial Bridge and Second Narrows Bridge, is the second bridge constructed at the Second (east) Narrows of Burrard Inlet in Vancouver, British Columbia, Canada. Originally named the Second Narrows Bridge, it connects Vancouver to the North Shore of Burrard Inlet, which includes the District of North Vancouver, the City of North Vancouver, and West Vancouver. It was constructed adjacent to the older Second Narrows Bridge, which is now exclusively a rail bridge. Its construction, from 1956 to 1960, was marred by a multi-death collapse on June 17, 1958. The First Narrows Bridge, better known as Lions Gate Bridge, crosses Burrard Inlet about 8 kilometres (5.0 mi) west of the Second Narrows.

The bridge is a steel truss cantilever bridge, designed by Swan Wooster Engineering Co. Ltd. Construction began in November 1957, and the bridge was officially opened on August 25, 1960. It cost approximately $23 million to build. Tolls were charged until April 1, 1963.

The bridge is 1,292 metres (4,239 ft) long with a centre span of 335 metres (1,099 ft). It is part of the Trans-Canada Highway (Highway 1).

== Collapse ==
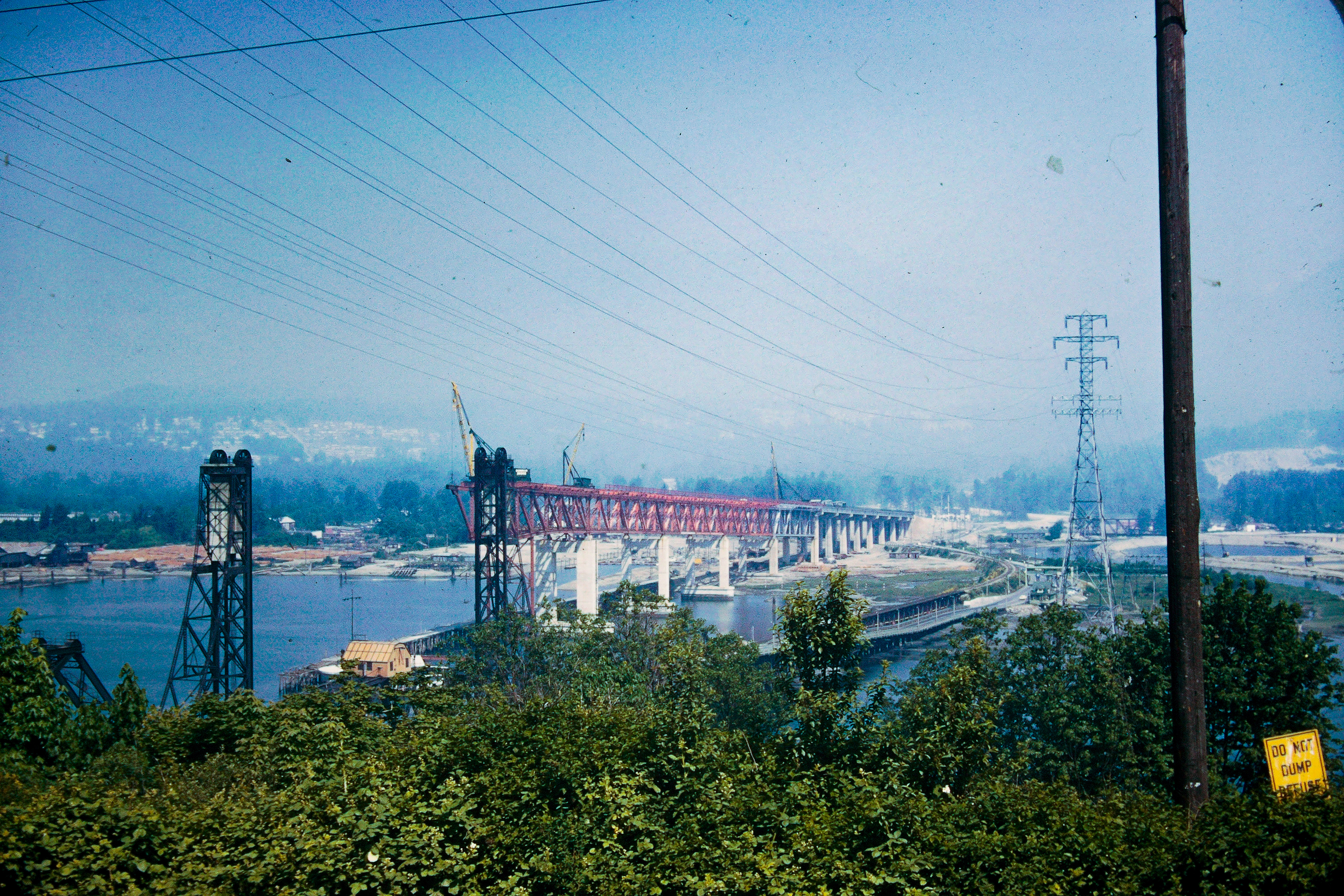
Under construction in June 1958, prior to collapse

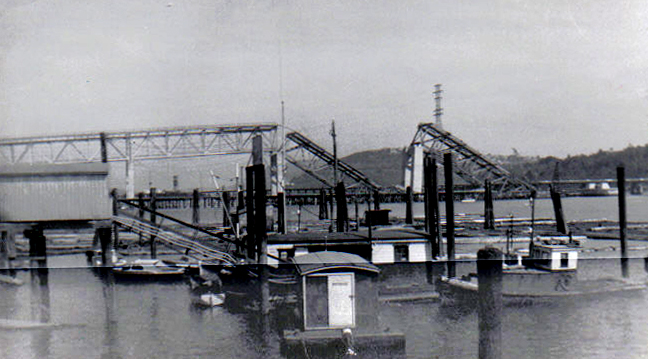
Collapsed spans in August 1958

On June 17, 1958, as a crane stretched from the north side of the new bridge to join the two chords of the unfinished arch, several spans collapsed. Seventy-nine workers plunged 30 metres (98 ft) into the water. Eighteen were killed either instantly or shortly thereafter, possibly drowned by their heavy tool belts. A diver searching for bodies drowned later, bringing the total fatalities for the collapse to nineteen. In a subsequent Royal Commission inquiry, the bridge collapse was attributed to miscalculation by bridge engineers. A temporary steel box support at the base of the falsework, holding the newly built fifth anchor span, was deemed insufficient to bear the weight. The falsework plans were drawn by a junior engineer and the error not noticed by the supervising engineer.

Earlier, in 1957, a steelworker had fallen to his death at the bridge. But in December 1957, a safety inspector from the BC Workmen's Compensation Board reported that the installation of a safety net under the work platforms was "impracticable".

== Renaming ==
The bridge was renamed the "Ironworkers Memorial Second Narrows Crossing" on June 17, 1994, to honour the eighteen workers who died in the collapse, along with one rescue diver and four other workers who also died during the construction process.

== In popular culture ==
- Bill Schermbrucker. 2009. Crossing Second Narrows. Winnipeg, MB: iUniverse.

== See also ==
- List of bridges in Canada
- List of bridge disasters
