= North Shore (Greater Vancouver) =

Areas adjacent to Vancouver, British Columbia

Coordinates: 49.3539°N 123.1036°W

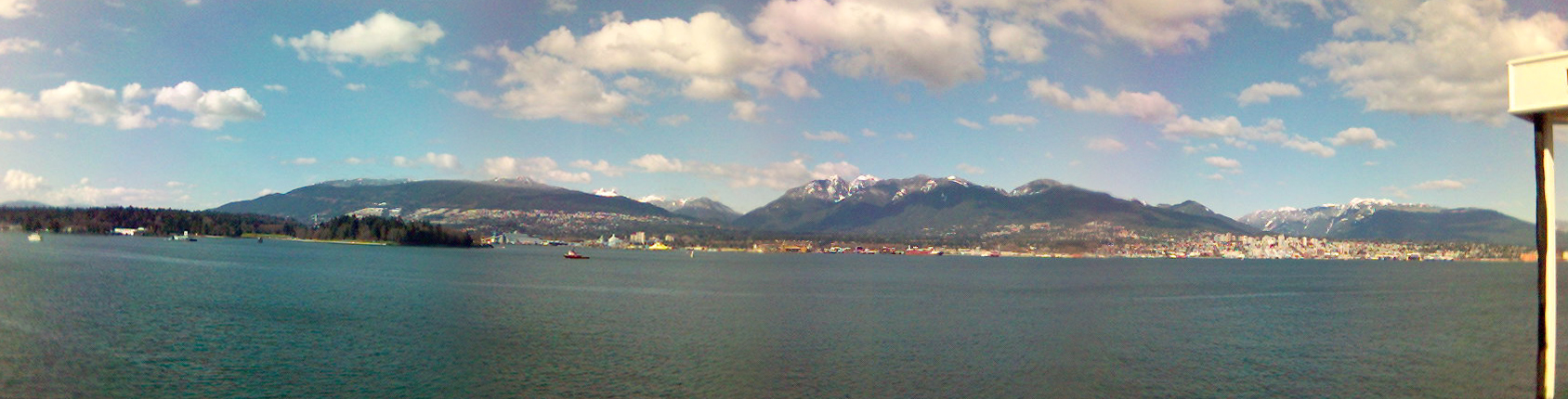
The North Shore, as seen from downtown Vancouver. To the right are the City and District of North Vancouver, and to the left is the District of West Vancouver.

The North Shore of Burrard Inlet is a term commonly used to refer to several areas adjacent to Vancouver, British Columbia, Canada:

- the District of West Vancouver
- the City of North Vancouver
- the District of North Vancouver
- the North Shore Mountains

It is renowned for its proximity to nature, varied outdoor recreation opportunities (especially mountain biking) as well as historically significant west coast modernist architecture.

== Access ==
Access to these municipalities is limited by geography. Three major bodies of water (Howe Sound to the west, Burrard Inlet to the south, and Indian Arm to the east) and the rugged peaks of the Coast Mountains to the north isolate the North Shore from the rest of the Lower Mainland.

Two road bridges (the Lions' Gate Bridge and Ironworkers Memorial Second Narrows Crossing) connect to the city of Vancouver and the Trans-Canada Highway. The only other road access is by way of Highway 99 from the north or the Horseshoe Bay ferry terminal from Vancouver Island and the Sunshine Coast.

The Canadian National Railway (CN) provides a freight rail link south to the rest of Greater Vancouver and the Lower Fraser Valley through its Second Narrows Rail Bridge–Thornton Tunnel corridor. The North Shore handles more than 40% of the Vancouver Fraser Port Authority's international trade exports. In addition, CN controls a less-used former BC Rail line north to Prince George, British Columbia. This line was used until October 2002 for the Cariboo Prospector passenger rail service between North Vancouver and Prince George. As of 2025, it hosts a passenger rail route between North Vancouver and Jasper, Alberta, that is operated by Rocky Mountaineer, a private luxury rail-tour company.

The SeaBus passenger ferry, part of the TransLink transit system, connects Lonsdale Quay with downtown Vancouver.

== See also ==
- Mount Brunswick
- The Lions (peaks)
