= Second Narrows Rail Bridge =

Vertical-lift railway bridge in Metro Vancouver, Canada

Second Narrows Bridge
- Second Narrows Bridge pictured in 2026
- Coordinates: 49.294638°N 123.024484°W
- Carries: 1 railway track
- Crosses: Burrard Inlet
- Locale: North Vancouver and Vancouver; British Columbia, Canada
- Maintained by: Canadian National Railway

Characteristics
- Design: Vertical-lift bridge
- Total length: 663 m (2,175 ft)
- Width: 9.8 m (32 ft)
- Longest span: 150 m (493 ft)
- Capacity: 26–41 trains per day

Rail characteristics
- No. of tracks: 1
- Track gauge: 4 ft 8 1/2 in (1,435 mm) (standard gauge)
- Electrified: No

History
- Engineering design by: Foundation of Canada Engineering Corporation and Hardesty & Hanover
- Constructed by: Canron-Western Bridge
- Opened: May 6, 1969

Statistics
- Daily traffic: 14 trains (as of 2018)

Location
- Location in Greater Vancouver

The Second Narrows Rail Bridge is a vertical-lift railway bridge that crosses the Burrard Inlet and connects Vancouver with the North Shore. The bridge's south end connects directly to the Thornton Tunnel, which connects it to the main Canadian rail network. The bridge gets its name from being located at the second narrowing (constriction) of the Burrard Inlet, as opposed to the First Narrows to the west that is adjacent to Stanley Park. The Second in the name is not indicative of it being the chronological successor of the original 1925 bridge, and it is not a delineation between the two above-water crossings currently in service at the location.

The bridge has a maximum speed limit of 16 kilometres per hour (10 mph).

== History ==
=== Background ===
During the Klondike Gold Rush, there were schemes to build a railway from Vancouver to the Dawson gold fields. The first stage in this would be to bridge Burrard Inlet and then build a railway north. John Hendry floated the Vancouver, Westminster, and Yukon Railway which built a line from Ladner to New Westminster and then to Vancouver via Burnaby Lake. This line was paired with the Great Northern Railway who also wanted trackage into Vancouver.

In the process, various other railroads all became involved in the bridging scheme: the Canadian Northern Railway, Milwaukee Road, and the Pacific Great Eastern Railway. The bridge itself would be owned by the Federal Government as they had control of harbours and shipping, and would lease access to the railways. One of the main reasons was the scarce amount of space on the South Shore of the Burrard Inlet for wharves. Railways wanted to develop the North Shore because the south side was occupied by another railway, the Canadian Pacific. A company was floated, the Burrard Inlet Bridge and Tunnel Company, and contracts were issued to span the tidal bore. At one point, a causeway was planned to dam the narrows and create bridges and wharves that way.

World War I intervened, as did the bankruptcy of all the interested railways. With it went dreams of the bridge and rails up Indian Arm, the Capilano valley, or via Howe Sound. However, the predecessor railways did sign contracts to build a bridge and a new Hotel Vancouver. Only after the war with huge increase in funding to improve harbours around the British Empire, partly due to problems associated with wartime shipping, did funds appear for the completion of the 1925 bridge. And so the north shore port became an amalgam of operations with Canadian National Railway (CNR), Pacific Great Eastern and Harbour and Wharves Commission all using the bridge when it was not out of service. North Vancouver ferries operated at this time as well.

The essential wartime shipyards in North Vancouver underscored the need for reliable industrial access. Further, the expansion of Lynnterm, Wheat elevators, coal and the sulphur port in the 1960s indicated the growing use of the North Shore.

=== Original bridge (1925) ===
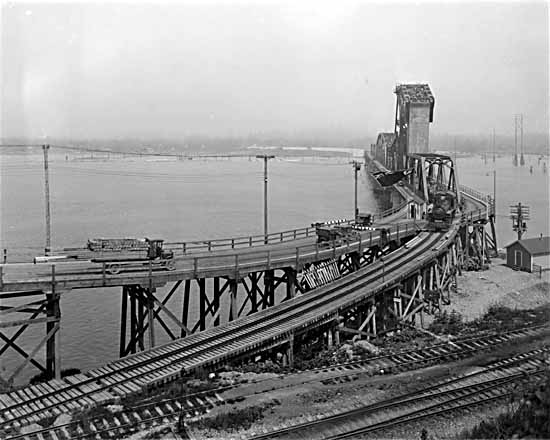
The original Second Narrows Bridge in 1926

Northern Construction & J.W. Stewart built the first bridge to connect Vancouver with the North Shore over the tidal bore of the narrows. A single-track railway was enclosed inside the bridge trusses, together with a 3.0-metre (10 ft) roadway on each side outside of the trusses, and a sidewalk on the east edge of the bridge. Including approaches, the road-rail bridge was about 2 kilometres (1.25 mi) long. At the North Shore, there were 1,400 metres (4,500 ft) of solid embankment, which connected to 260 metres (850 ft) of trestles, and then a series of two 46-metre (150 ft) fixed spans. The longest fixed span of 91 metres (300 ft) was next, which connected to the bascule span that opened for taller marine vessels. A final 46-metre (150 ft) fixed span was south of the bascule span, and then 200 metres (650 ft) of trestles connected the bridge to the South Shore.

The SS Losmar after knocking down a span of the Second Narrows Bridge in early 1930

The drawspan was a 57-metre-long (187 ft), single-leaf Strauss bascule design that rotated about its southern support. This span provided 53 metres (175 ft) of horizontal clearance for taller ships. When in the closed position, the bridge offered a vertical clearance of 6.8 metres (22.2 ft) at high tide.

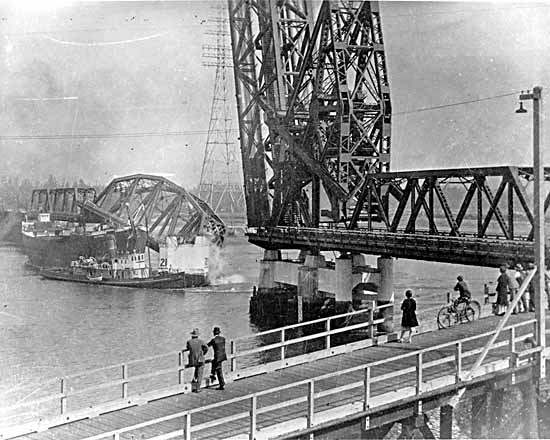
Collision of the Pacific Gatherer in late 1930

The attached vehicle deck opened to road traffic in 1925 and the main structure to trains a year later. Vehicle traffic was required to stop whenever a train crossed the bridge.

After the bridge had been hit by a number of ships and had been out of service for four years, the provincial government bought it in 1933 and installed a lift section of the deck. The bascule span was permanently locked in the closed position and shortened by two 8.5-metre (28 ft) truss panels. The 91-metre (300 ft) destroyed span was replaced by a 87-metre (286 ft) lift span, and the southern lift tower was built atop two other panels of the bascule span. Two new piers were constructed to support the new lift span, and the southern pier of the destroyed span was demolished.

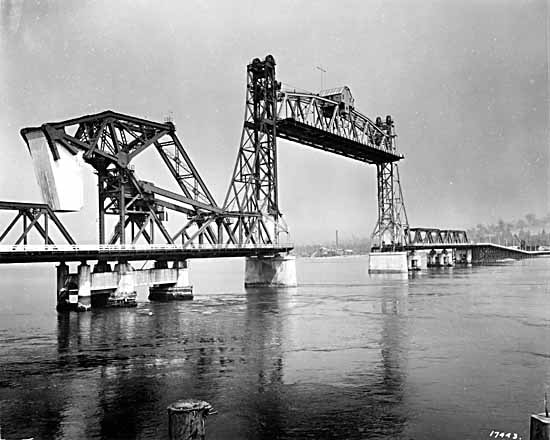
The original Second Narrows Bridge in 1934, after a vertical-lift drawspan (center) was installed and the existing single-leaf bascule drawspan (left) was permanently locked in the closed position

In 1960, a new much larger and higher 6-lane Second Narrows Bridge with a 350-metre (1,150 ft) span was completed alongside the original bridge, and the original bridge was converted exclusively for rail use. In 1994, the new road bridge was renamed the Ironworkers Memorial Second Narrows Crossing in honour of the ironworkers who died in accidents while building it. However, the new bridge is still commonly referred to as the Second Narrows Bridge.

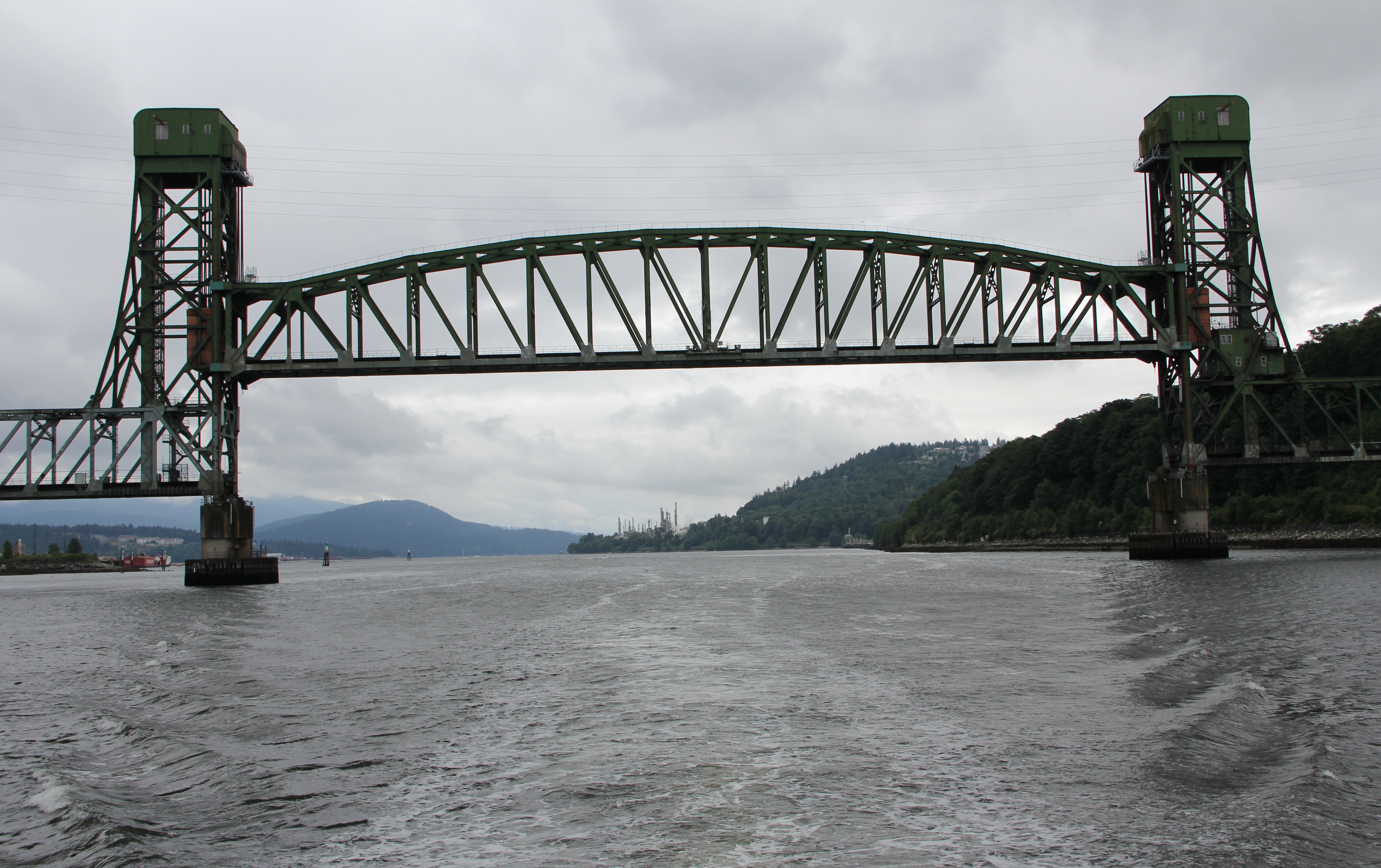
The rebuilt, rail-only bridge in 2012, when raised (its default state)

=== Second bridge (1969) ===
In 1969, the original 1925 rail bridge was replaced by CNR with a larger, higher lift bridge located just east of the old rail bridge. The lift section now had a length of 150 metres (493 ft), which was the longest lift span in Canada. A bridgetender activates cables and counterweights to raise the span. Unless moving a train across Burrard Inlet, the lift section is always in the up position to allow ships to go underneath.

The current bridge has a vertical clearance of 47 metres (153 ft) during mean high tide when the main lift span is fully raised (open position). The vertical lift section of the Second Narrows Railway Bridge provides 140 metres (450 ft) clear navigation width between rubbing fenders. However, the Ironworkers Second Narrows road bridge has a vertical clearance of 44 metres (144 ft) and the shipping channel where the maximum horizontal clearance available is 110 metres (360 ft) wide.

== Chronology of the bridges ==
- 1902: The V. W. and Y Railway is completed to Burnaby. A bridge is planned.
- 1910: Bridge plans by the Burrard Inlet Bridge and Tunnel Company are proposed.
- 1912: Land speculation happens on the North Shore, subject to completion of a bridge.
- 1914: A railway to Deep Cove and Port Moody is planned.
- 1915: Stock market collapses; P. G. E. Railway goes bankrupt.
- 1916: A causeway is planned; Canadian Northern goes bankrupt.
- 1925: A smaller, lower bridge than originally envisioned is completed.
- 1926: Trains begin using the bridge.
- 1927: The freighter Eurana, carrying large cargo of lumber, hits the bridge on March 10, causing almost CA$8,000 worth of damage.
- 1928: Hit by freighter Norwich City.
- 1930: The freighter Losmar rams through the span south of the bascule section on April 24, also causing damage to the foundations. The span is pulled out of the inlet waters, repaired, and remounted onto the bridge by floating on the rising and falling tides. The bridge reopens for vehicle traffic on June 8, and train traffic resumes shortly afterward.
- 1930: On September 19, the barge Pacific Gatherer becomes wedged under the bridge's 91-metre (300 ft) span. The tide rises, pushing the barge up under the span, knocking it off its supports. The span hangs off one side before suddenly breaking free and sinking into the depths of Burrard Inlet. Lawsuits and the bankruptcy of the Bridge company delay any attempt at repairs. The bridge remains closed for four years.
- 1933: The bridge is sold to the provincial government and repairs begin.
- 1934: The bridge reopens. The bascule span is locked permanently in the closed position, and the destroyed centre fixed span is replaced by an 87-metre (286 ft) vertical-lift span that provided a vertical clearance of 43 metres (140 ft) above high water.
- 1950: CNR begins negotiations in May to acquire the bridge and then publicly announces an agreement in November.
- 1951: A plebiscite requiring 60% voter approval to transfer the bridge to CNR passes handily in the district of North Vancouver but fails by less than 1% in the city of North Vancouver.
- 1952: Voters in the city and district of North Vancouver approve a revised plebiscite to lease just the non-road portion of the bridge to CNR, based on promises to lure out-of-province industrial companies to the North Shore. The lease is for 21 years and gives CNR an option to buy the bridge for $1 upon lease expiration. With the revised terms, the city and district could continue collecting bridge tolls from the increasing volume of North Shore commuters avoiding the congested Lion's Gate Bridge over the First Narrows.
- 1959: The bridge sets a record for highest annual net profit, making about $635,000 off a record traffic volume of about 6 million road vehicles. A third traffic lane is proposed by putting planks around the railway track, with the provincial government funding half of the estimated $200,000 cost. The plans are dropped after the province refuses to fund the proposal.
- 1960: The new provincially owned road bridge at the Second Narrows opens in August. As a result, annual traffic volume on the old bridge drops to about 4.3 million vehicles, and the annual profit is about $380,000.
- 1961: After a full year of competition with the dedicated road bridge, the old bridge experiences a drastic drop in traffic volume to about 1.2 million vehicles, and its profit plummets to about $45,000 despite it having a cheaper toll rate than the other two Burrard Inlet road bridges.
- 1963: The bridge is closed to highway traffic.
- 1964: The bridge is sold to CNR after the Burrard Inlet Bridge and Tunnel Company decides to dissolve itself and allow CNR to exercise its $1 right to buy before the original 1973 option date.
- 1965: CNR unveils plans to build a replacement rail bridge and a tunnel to bypass the existing, meandering route from the south through central Vancouver and the South Shore.
- 1969: A new, larger lift bridge is built immediately to the east of the 1926 bridge.
- 1969: The Thornton Tunnel is dug for CN trains to connect with the rail line at Willingdon.
- 1970: The old 1926 bridge is removed, as are its cement piers.
- 1979: In October, the Japanese freighter Japan Erica, carrying logs, collides with the bridge in a heavy fog, knocking a section of the bridge just north of the lift span into the water. The bridge was closed until March 4, 1980. The cost of fixing the bridge was $6.5 million.

== See also ==
- List of bridges in Canada
- Ironworkers Memorial Second Narrows Crossing

== Bibliography ==
- McGarry, H. E. (September 1980). "CN Rail span knock-out" (PDF). Canadian Rail. No. 344. The Canadian Railroad Historical Association. pp. 260–271. ISSN 0008-4875.
- Pratley, P. L. (August 1934). "The substructure of the reconstructed Second Narrows Bridge, Vancouver". The Engineering Journal. 17 (8). Engineering Institute of Canada: 343–357. ISSN 0013-8010.
- Pratley, P. L. (January 1936). "The superstructure of the reconstructed Second Narrows Bridge, Vancouver". The Engineering Journal. 19 (1). Engineering Institute of Canada: 3–23. ISSN 0013-8010.
