= South Westminster =

Neighbourhood of Surrey, British Columbia

- Neighbourhood of Surrey
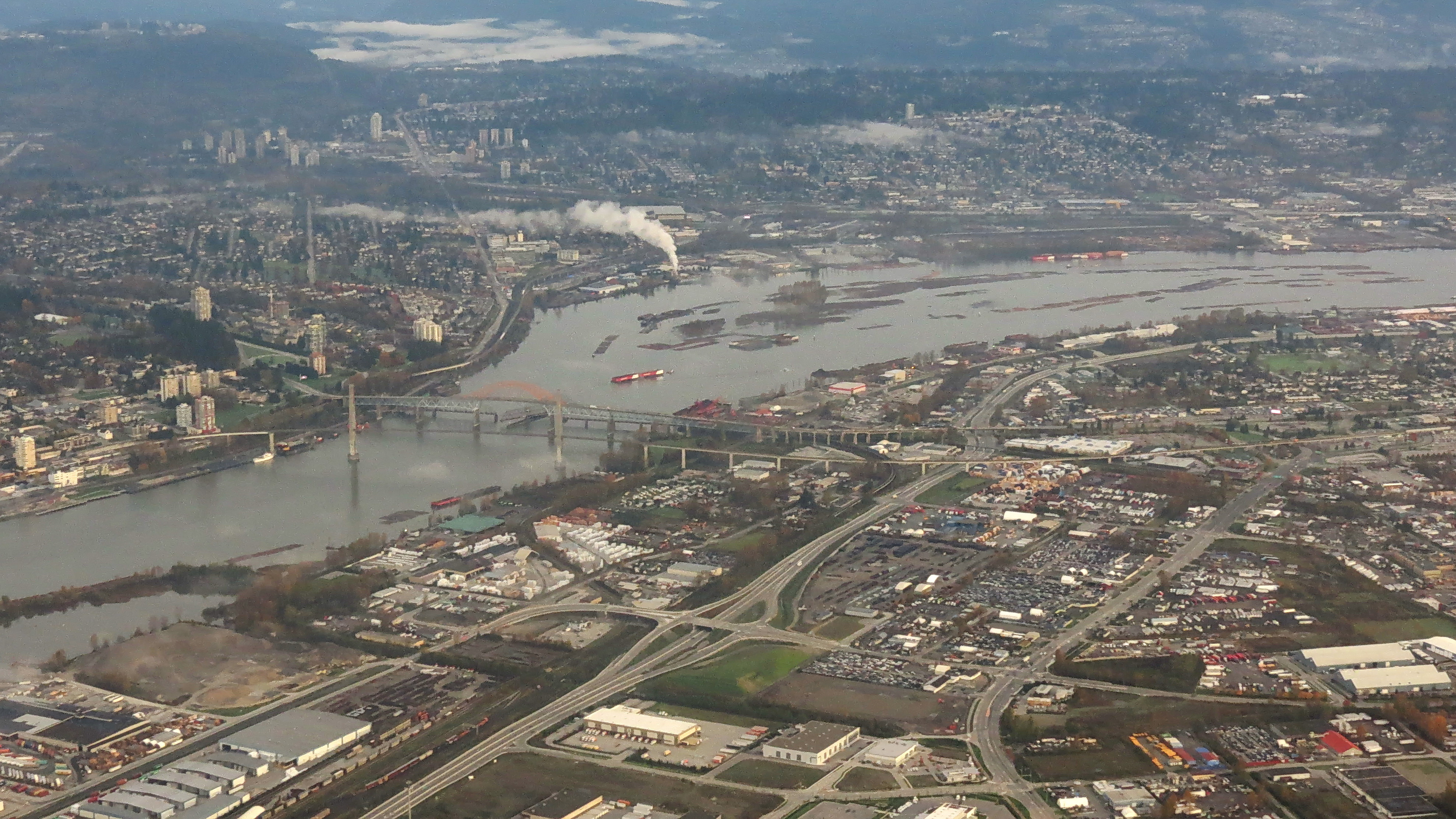
- Aerial view of South Westminster

- Location within Metro Vancouver
- Coordinates: 49.1994°N 122.8825°W
- Country: Canada
- Province: British Columbia
- Region: Lower Mainland
- Regional district: Metro Vancouver
- Town centre: Whalley

Government
  - Mayor: Brenda Locke
  - MP (Fed.): Randeep Sarai (Liberal)
  - MLA (Prov.): Bruce Ralston (NDP)
- Time zone: UTC−8 (PST)
  - Summer (DST): UTC−7 (PDT)

South Westminster is an industrial neighbourhood in the Whalley town centre of Surrey, British Columbia, Canada, located on the Fraser River south of the city of New Westminster.

== History ==
South Westminster is historically known as Brownsville, a former residential community that was first settled in the late 19th century. During the mid-20th century, South Westminster began development into the present day industrial area.

== Transportation ==
South Westminster is served by Scott Road station of Metro Vancouver's SkyTrain rapid transit system. The station is located in the northern end of the neighbourhood at the interchange between the King George Boulevard and Scott Road, near the border with Bridgeview.
