= Brownsville, British Columbia =

Coordinates: 49°12′20″N 122°53′00″W

Brownsville was a former community in what is now the City of Surrey, British Columbia, Canada. Also known as South Westminster, it was located where the city ran a small ferry across the Fraser River, today approximately where the east footing of the SkyBridge is, this was also the former site of qiqéyt (Qayqayt), one of the main summer villages of the Kwantlen people and later, also the Musqueam people

== History ==
The town was named after Ebenezer Brown, who owned property in the area and had come from England in 1858-1859 during the Fraser Gold Rush. He was a stonemason and made the border monument at Point Roberts. He served on New Westminster's city council and later was elected as MLA for New Westminster, then for New Westminster City, and became President of the Executive Council of British Columbia (i.e. the cabinet). Issues about conflict of interest in connection with railway building led to his retirement from politics in 1881.

=== Kikait (qiqéyt) ===
The indigenous summer village called Kikait, modern spelling qiqéyt, was at the site of Brownsville prior to Ebenezer Brown taking up land there. The Kwikwetlem people had been driven from the site of New Westminster by the Kwantlen people, who had enslaved them and forced them to the site of Kikait, which had been marshy until filled by them with rocks and stones to make a village site for the Kwantlens. Simon Fraser is said to have spent a night here on his way to the mouth of the Fraser in 1808.

The chief of this community was Whattlekainum, the son of a Tsawwassen woman who was raised and trained at Tsawwassen but is also regarded as a chief by the Katzie and Kwantlen. While closely associated with the Musqueam and Kwantlen people, this former fishing camp was used by the Tsawwassen and other Halkomelem or Hun'qum'i'num (hən̓q̓əmin̓əm̓) groups during late summers. Salmon and sturgeon were caught and processed here before being brought back for storage at the longhouses of the winter villages. This was also the site of a church in which many marriages and baptisms were conducted for the Hun'qum'i'num people of the Lower Fraser.

== Railway point ==
The name Brownsville was used for a railway point just south of this location by the Burlington Northern Railway.

== See also ==
- List of ghost towns in British Columbia
