= Upper Lonsdale =

Suburban area in North Vancouver, Canada

Coordinates: 49.339°N 123.072°W

Upper Lonsdale is a suburban area in both the City and District of North Vancouver. This area runs north of Highway 1 (around 24th Street) to the corner of Lonsdale and Rockland (where Lonsdale Avenue comes to an end). The first 5 blocks up Lonsdale Avenue (from 25th Street to 29th Street) are part of the City of North Vancouver, while the remaining blocks (29th Street to Rockland) belong to the District of North Vancouver. Upper Lonsdale is the more residential part of Lonsdale Avenue, although it does have a couple of blocks of shops and services (all of which run from 29th Street up to Kings Road—only two blocks). The peak of Lonsdale Avenue (where it meets Rockland) sits at an elevation of 850 feet above sea level whereas Lower Lonsdale (a mere 5 minute drive south) sits at sea level at some points. The bus line 230 to Upper Lonsdale and Lonsdale Quay serves the area all the way up to the end of Lonsdale Avenue, before going down Rockland Street. See Arthur Heywood-Lonsdale for the origins of the name Lonsdale.

Many of the avenues of Upper Lonsdale that run north–south are also found in Central and Lower Lonsdale, including Lonsdale Ave, Jones Ave, Mahon Ave and St Andrews Ave, St Georges Ave, and Chesterfield Ave. These avenues that can be thought of as generally running “north/south”, run more accurately northeast by north–southwest by south once they are below 8th St – this includes the southernmost section of Central Lonsdale, and all of Lower Lonsdale.

In terms of avenues named after Saints in Upper Lonsdale, ones not found in Central or Lower Lonsdale include St Marys Ave, St Kilda Ave, St Albans Ave, and St Pauls Ave. Other north–south avenues that are also found in Upper Lonsdale, but not in Central or Lower Lonsdale, include Stanley Ave, Calder Ave, Carnarvon Ave, Woobury Ave, Norwood Ave, Maitland Ave, Regent Ave, and Princess Ave. Another north/south roadway that's also found in Upper Lonsdale, and not in Central or Lower Lonsdale, is Dalkeith Dr.

== Architecture ==
Notables buildings in Upper Lonsdale include the heritage designated four-story Chesterfield House School (3371 Chesterfield Ave). It is the former home of the Chesterfield School for Boys, built in a Tudor style around 1912–1913. In 2010, this heritage building underwent a conversion to allow it to be used as a residential apartment building, but retained most of its original character.

== Recreation ==
Being on the side of the mountain, there are various options for outdoor recreation from Upper Lonsdale for hikers, dog walkers, trail runners and mountain bikers among others. In the northernmost part of Upper Lonsdale, various trail access points can be found for hiking and mountain biking trails on Mount Fromme, as well as connector trails like the Baden-Powell Trail that lead to surrounding areas of North Vancouver (District) and West Vancouver.

In terms of parks within Upper Lonsdale, the most central is Carisbrooke Park. Carisbrook Park is a square shaped park bounded by Lonsdale Ave, Osborne Rd East, and Carisbrooke Rd E on its west, north and south sides respectively, as well as residential properties on the east side.

Saint Albans Park is a northern park which falls mostly within Upper Lonsdale, but also crosses over into the north east corner of the neighbouring area of Upper Delbrook.

To the south, Tempe Heights Park is another park in Upper Lonsdale, but one that likewise also crosses over into a neighbouring area – the Tempe neighbourhood in that case. The Tempe Heights Park is a linear park located on the north side of the Highway 1; it extends to Ridgeway Avenue on the west side, then to the east it crosses over into the Tempe neighbourhood (between Tempe Crescent and Tempe Knoll Dr) and ends at Lynn Valley Rd. Aside natural features like a pond and forest, and paths and open areas within the park, the amenities of this park includes a playground, a basketball half court, and two tennis courts - one of which has pickleball lines.
