= North Vancouver (district municipality) =

Municipality in British Columbia, Canada

North Vancouver North Van
- District municipality
- The Corporation of the District of North Vancouver
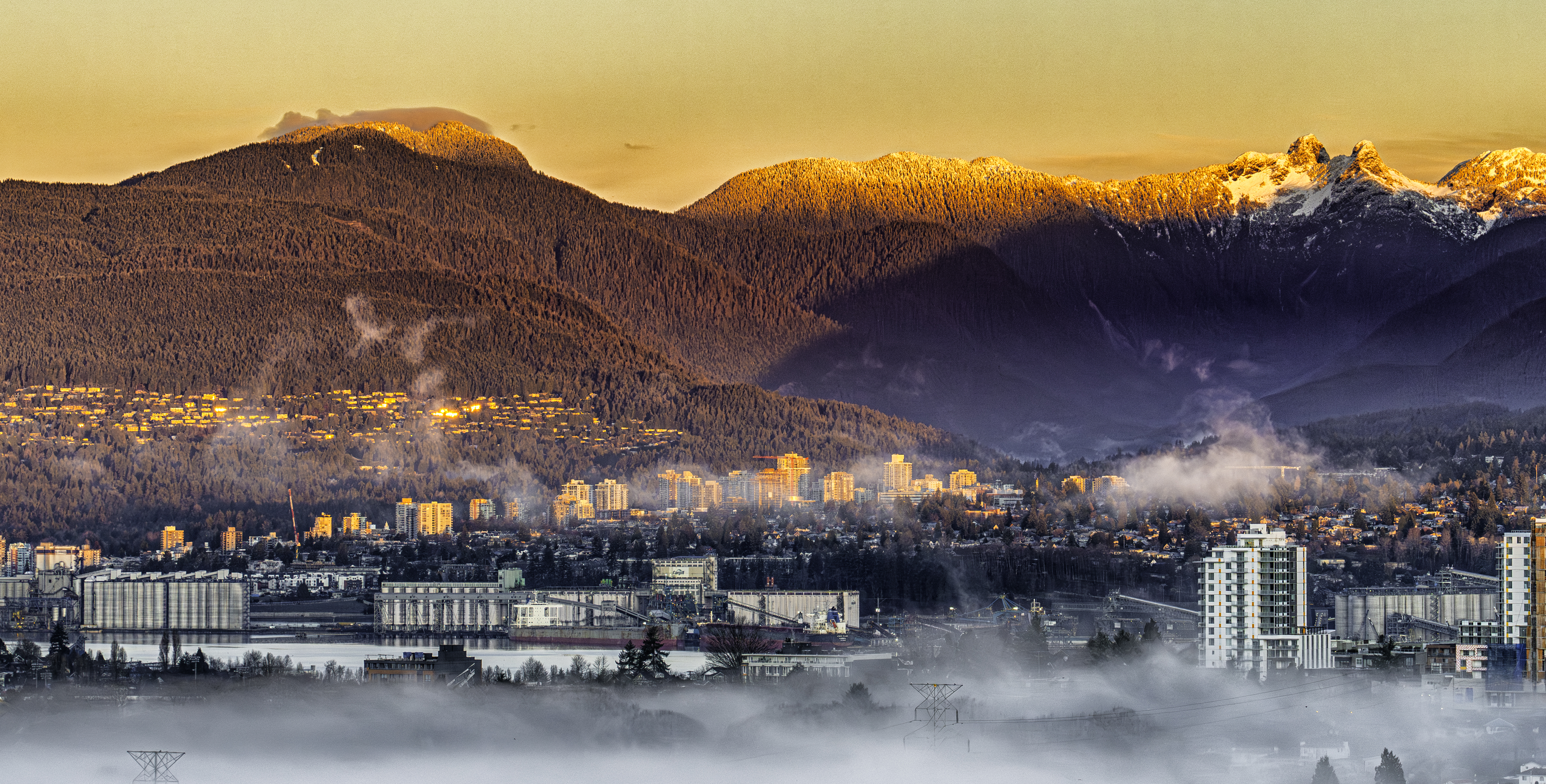
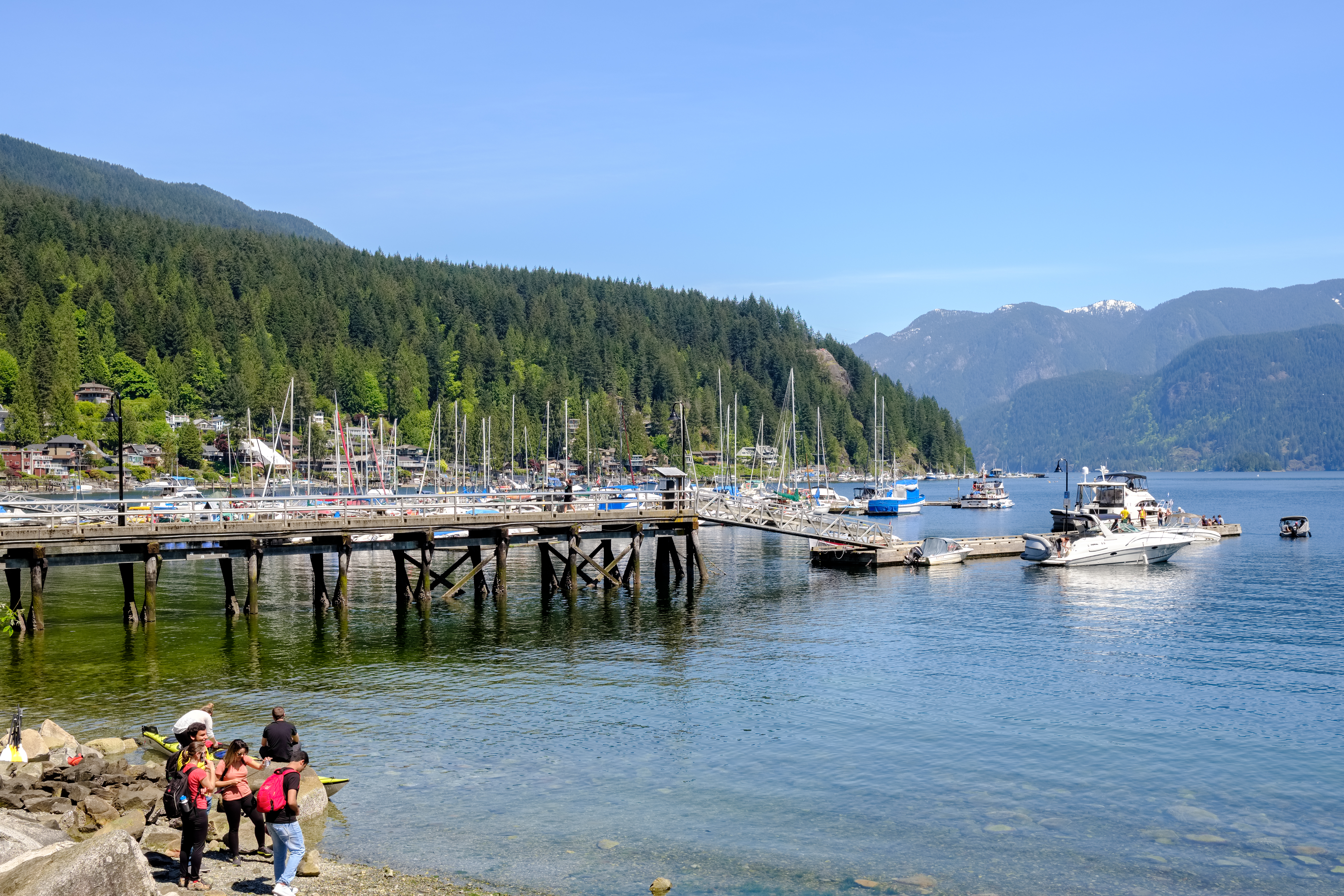
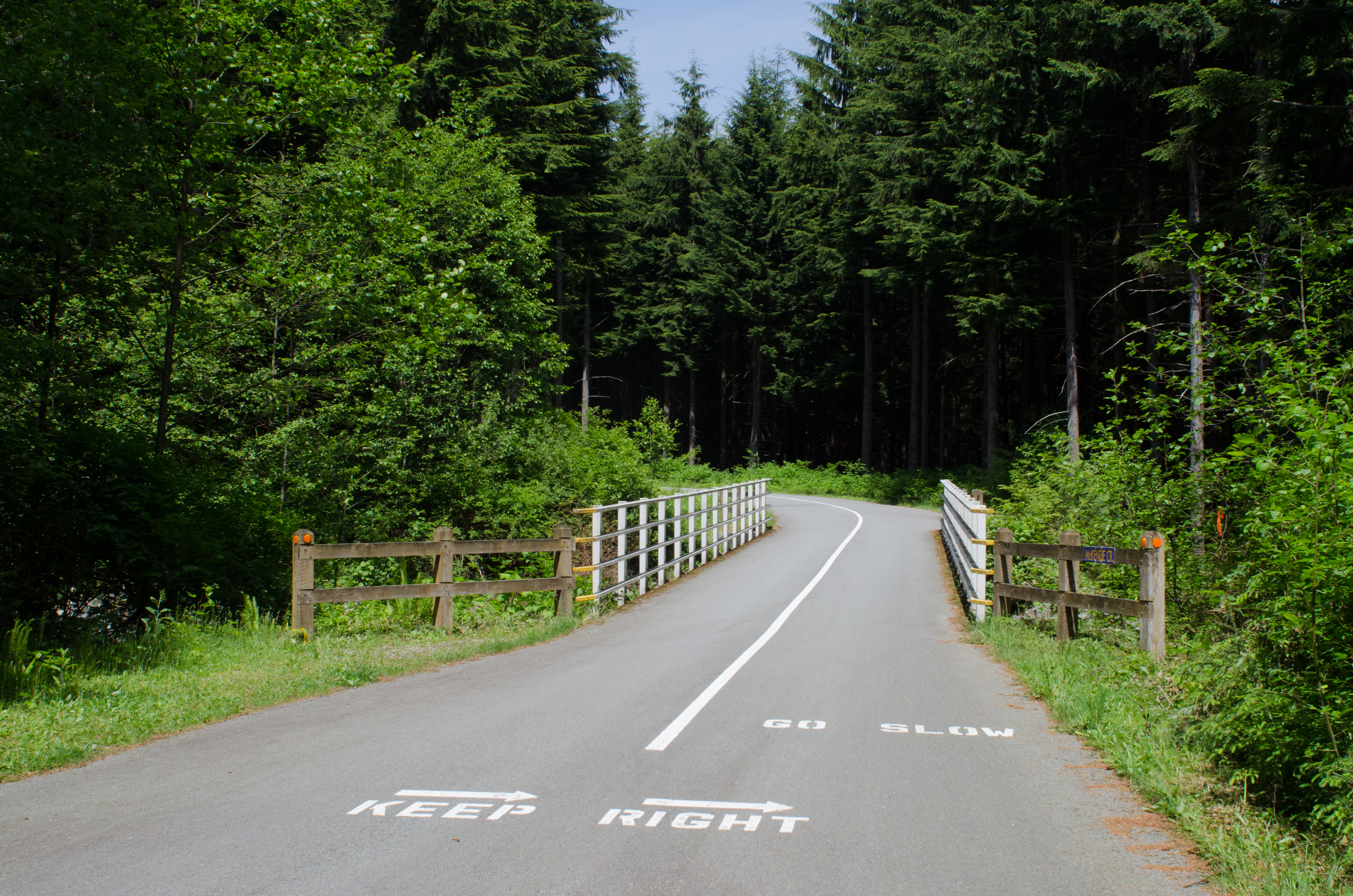
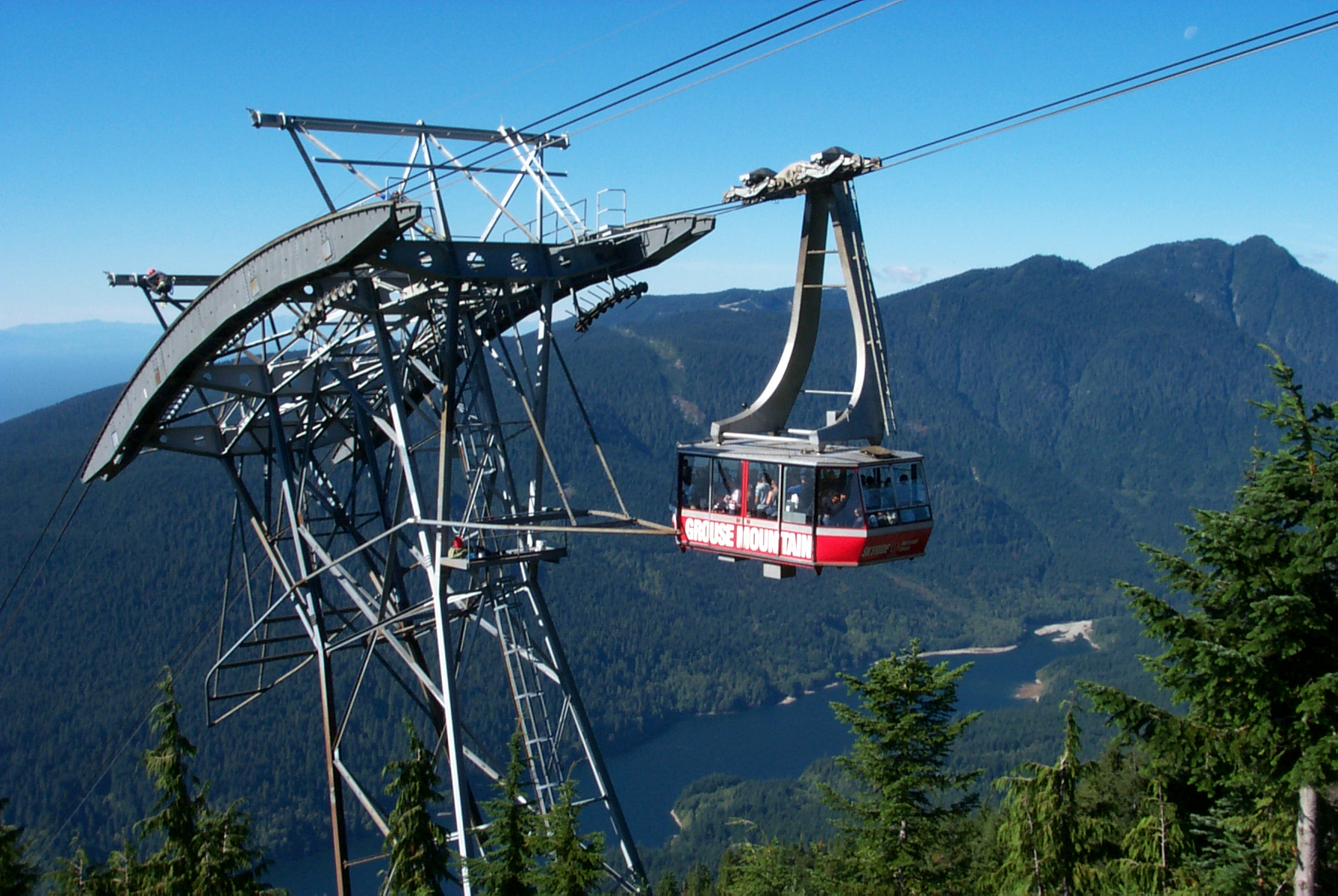
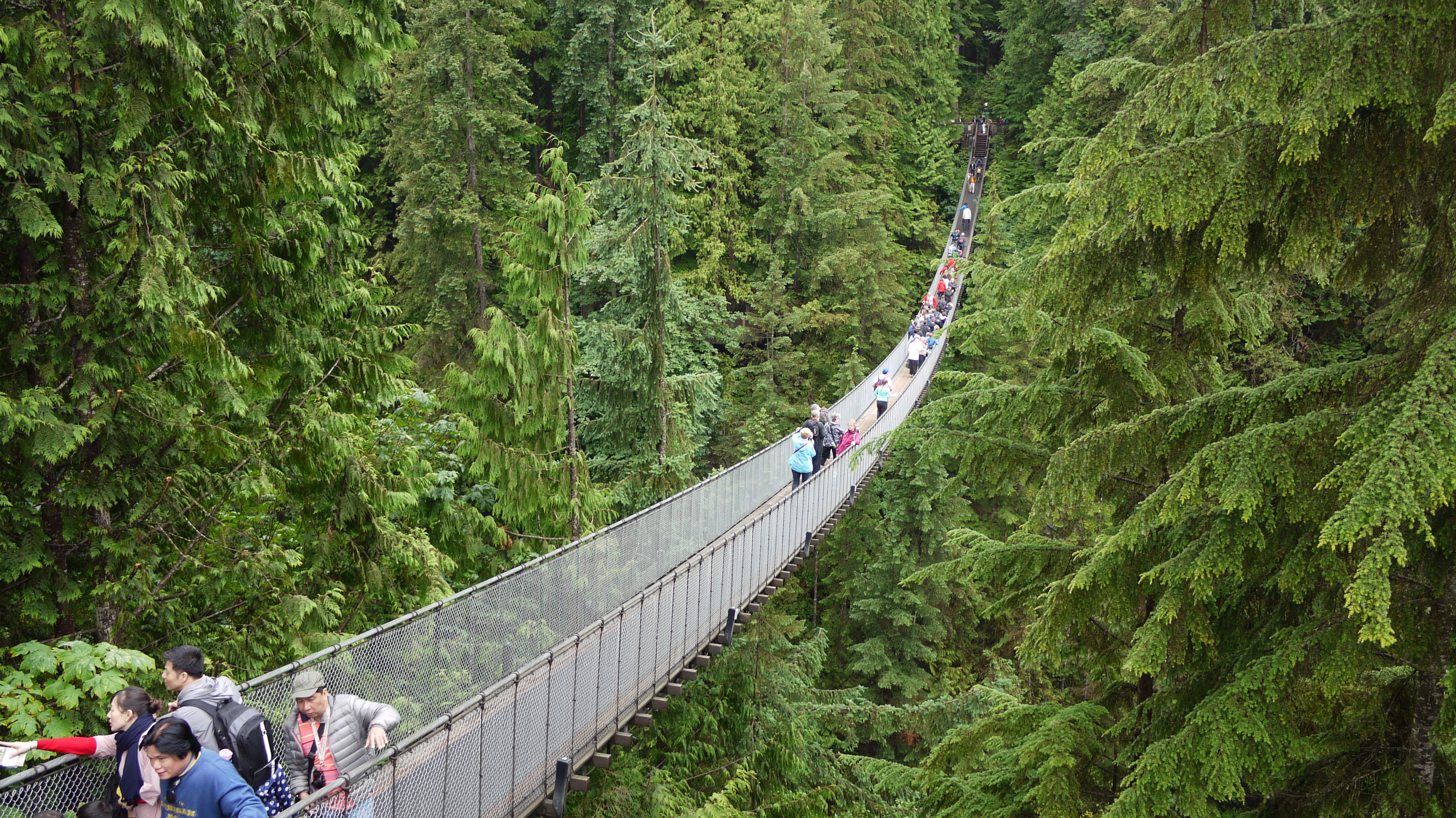
- Skyline of the District of North Vancouver Deep Cove Seymour Valley Trailway Grouse Mountain Gondola Capilano Suspension Bridge

- Flag
- Nickname: North Van
- Motto: "Montes Rivique Nobis Inspirant" (English: "The Mountains and Rivers Inspire Us")
- Location of the District of North Vancouver in Metro Vancouver
- Coordinates: 49°18′40″N 123°01′10″W
- Country: Canada
- Province: British Columbia
- Regional district: Metro Vancouver
- Incorporated: August 10, 1891

Government
  - Type: Mayor-council government
  - Mayor: Mike Little
  - Municipal council: List of councillors: Jordan Back; Betty Forbes; Jim Hanson; Herman Mah; Lisa Muri; Catherine Pope
  - MP: Braeden Caley (LPC); Terry Beech (LPC)
  - MLA: Bowinn Ma (NDP); Susie Chant (NDP); Lynne Block (CPBC)

Area
  - Land: 160.66 km^{2} (62.03 sq mi)
- Highest elevation: 1,449 m (4,754 ft)
- Lowest elevation: 0 m (0 ft)

Population (2021)
  - Total: 88,168
  - Estimate (2023): 95,350
  - Density: 548.8/km^{2} (1,421/sq mi)
- Demonym: North Vancouverite
- Time zone: UTC−07:00 (Pacific Time)
- Forward sortation area: V7G – V7R
- Area codes: 604, 778, 236, 672
- Website: www.dnv.org

The District of North Vancouver, commonly North Vancouver or North Van, is a district municipality in British Columbia, Canada, situated north of the city of Vancouver across the Burrard Inlet. It surrounds the respective City of North Vancouver on three sides, and the remaining North Shore municipality of West Vancouver on the other, and is part of the Metro Vancouver Regional District.

== History ==
First, the Spanish arrived, giving their name to Vancouver's Spanish Banks, and, in 1792, Captain George Vancouver explored the local shores.

Since 2018, there have been proposals to amalgamate the District of North Vancouver with the City of North Vancouver into a single North Vancouver. Surveys have shown that the majority of the municipalities' residents support the idea, and many do not even know that the city and the district are separate entities.

== Geography ==
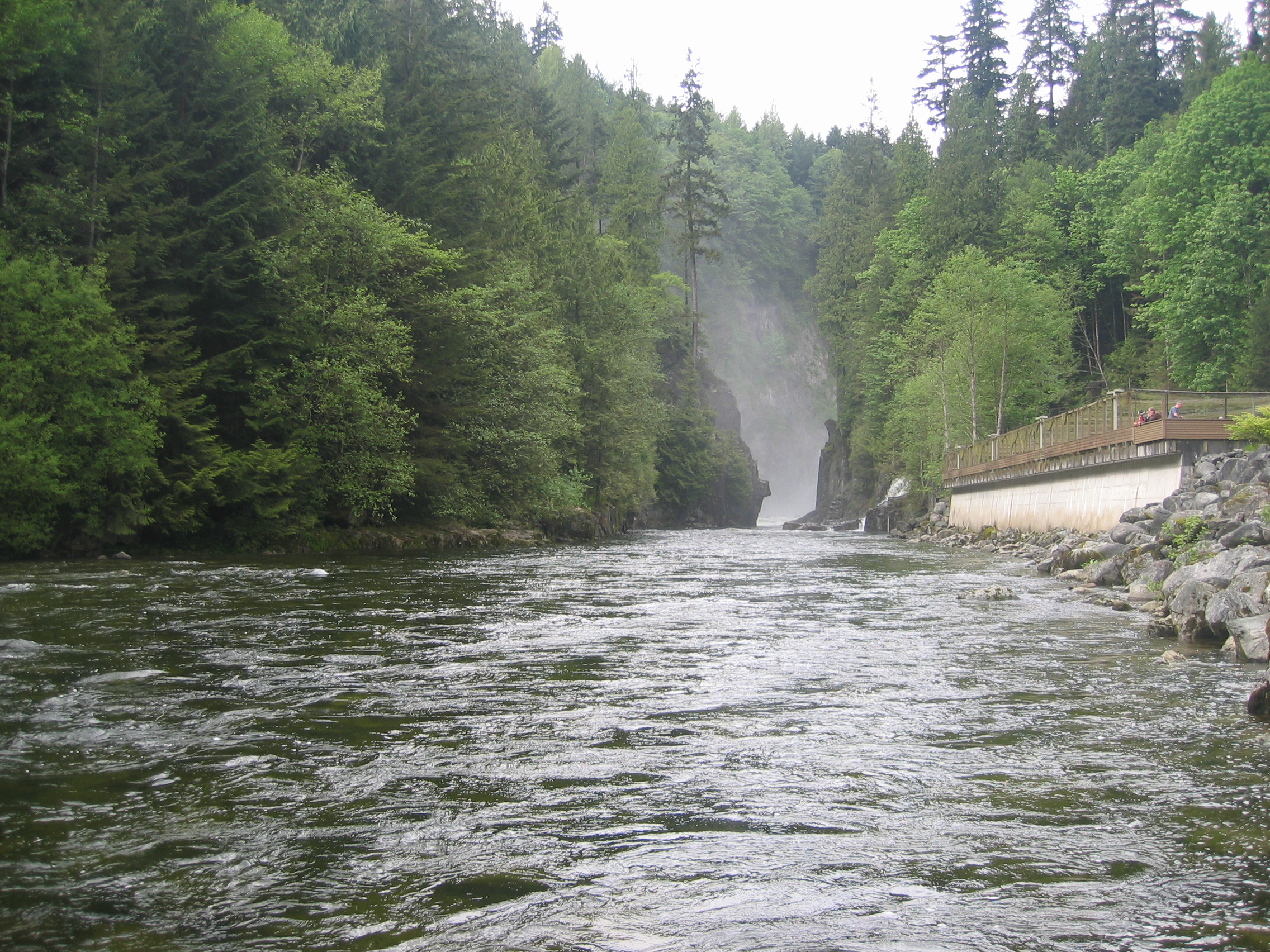
Capilano River

The District of North Vancouver is separated from Vancouver by the Burrard Inlet. It can be accessed by the Lions' Gate Bridge, the Ironworkers Memorial Second Narrows Crossing, and the SeaBus passenger ferry.

The district is bounded by the Capilano River to the west, Indian Arm to the east, Burrard Inlet to the south, and the Coast Mountains to the north. It sprawls in an east–west direction across the mountain slopes and is characterized by rugged terrain and steep and winding roadways. While there is no true urban core within the district, there are a number of separate commercial neighbourhood centres. These include (from west to east): Edgemont Village, Upper Lonsdale, Lynn Valley, Main Street, Parkgate, and Deep Cove.

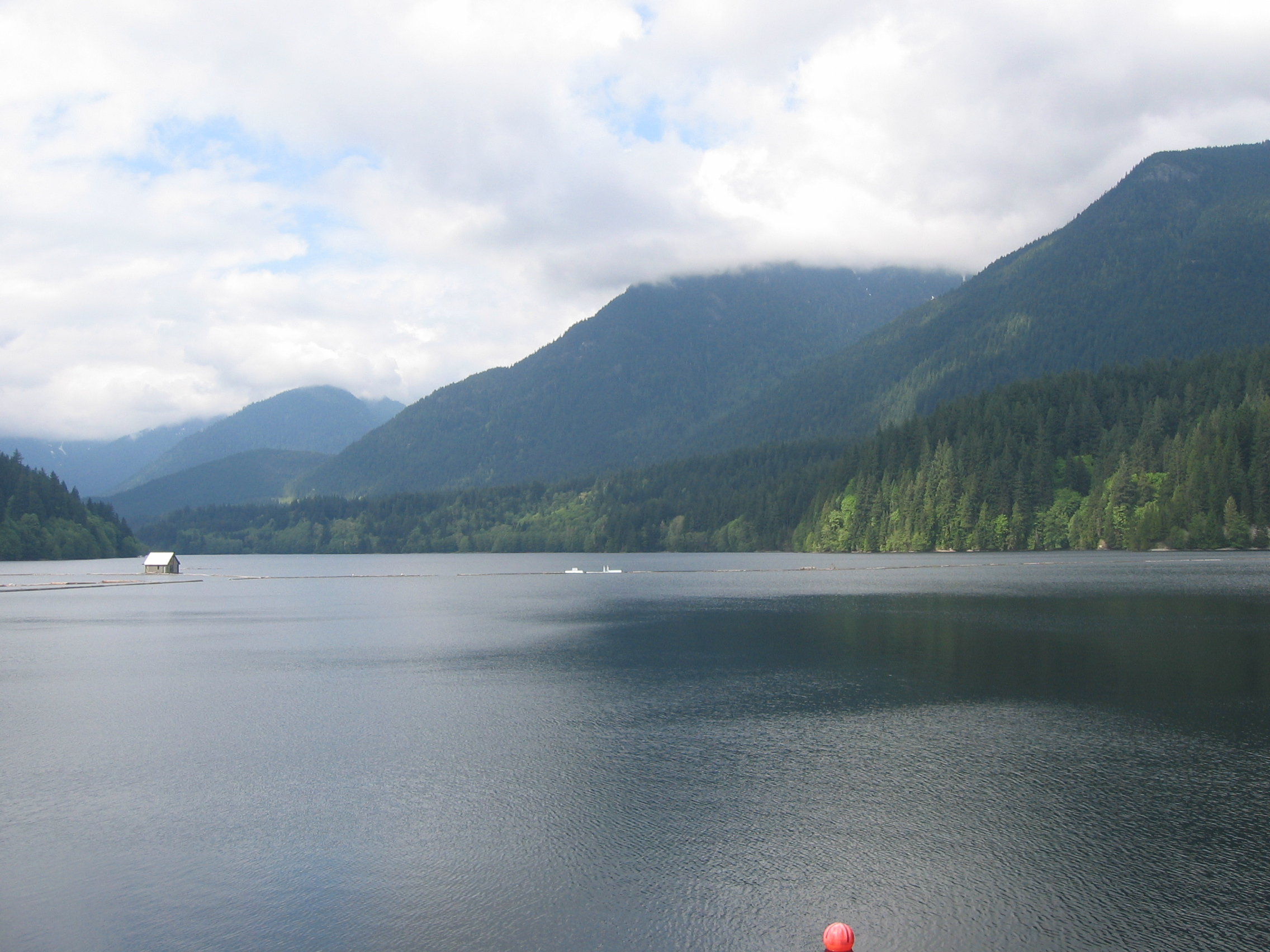
Capilano Lake

Collectively, the district, West Vancouver and the City of North Vancouver are commonly referred to as the North Shore.

Climate data for North Vancouver (N Vancouver 2nd Narrows) (Elevation: 4m) 1981–2010
Month	Jan	Feb	Mar	Apr	May	Jun	Jul	Aug	Sep	Oct	Nov	Dec	Year
Average precipitation mm (inches)	262.2 (10.32)	172.3 (6.78)	168.4 (6.63)	136.3 (5.37)	103.3 (4.07)	82.5 (3.25)	53.2 (2.09)	54.9 (2.16)	76.8 (3.02)	189.0 (7.44)	293.4 (11.55)	238.6 (9.39)	1,830.8 (72.08)
Average rainfall mm (inches)	255.3 (10.05)	167.7 (6.60)	166.8 (6.57)	136.1 (5.36)	103.3 (4.07)	82.5 (3.25)	53.2 (2.09)	54.9 (2.16)	76.8 (3.02)	189.0 (7.44)	290.2 (11.43)	229.9 (9.05)	1,805.6 (71.09)
Average snowfall cm (inches)	6.9 (2.7)	5.2 (2.0)	1.6 (0.6)	0.2 (0.1)	0.0 (0.0)	0.0 (0.0)	0.0 (0.0)	0.0 (0.0)	0.0 (0.0)	0.1 (0.0)	2.3 (0.9)	8.7 (3.4)	24.9 (9.8)
Average precipitation days (≥ 0.2 mm)	20.5	15.5	18.0	15.4	13.8	11.7	7.4	6.7	9.6	16.1	20.9	20.3	175.9
Average rainy days (≥ 0.2 mm)	19.7	15.1	17.9	15.4	13.8	11.7	7.4	6.7	9.6	16.0	20.7	19.6	173.5
Average snowy days (≥ 0.2 cm)	1.7	0.92	0.54	0.12	0.0	0.0	0.0	0.0	0.0	0.08	0.72	2.2	6.2
Source: Environment Canada (normals, 1981–2010)

Climate data for North Vancouver (N Vancouver Redonda Dr) (Elevation: 229m) 1971–2000
Month	Jan	Feb	Mar	Apr	May	Jun	Jul	Aug	Sep	Oct	Nov	Dec	Year
Average precipitation mm (inches)	301.9 (11.89)	285.3 (11.23)	223.8 (8.81)	187.0 (7.36)	141.7 (5.58)	108.3 (4.26)	66.6 (2.62)	81.3 (3.20)	105.0 (4.13)	232.0 (9.13)	389.9 (15.35)	353.9 (13.93)	2,476.8 (97.51)
Average rainfall mm (inches)	283.1 (11.15)	263.9 (10.39)	218.9 (8.62)	186.0 (7.32)	141.7 (5.58)	108.3 (4.26)	66.6 (2.62)	81.3 (3.20)	105.0 (4.13)	231.7 (9.12)	382.5 (15.06)	331.6 (13.06)	2,400.6 (94.51)
Average snowfall cm (inches)	18.8 (7.4)	21.5 (8.5)	4.9 (1.9)	1.1 (0.4)	0.0 (0.0)	0.0 (0.0)	0.0 (0.0)	0.0 (0.0)	0.0 (0.0)	0.3 (0.1)	7.4 (2.9)	22.3 (8.8)	76.2 (30.0)
Average precipitation days (≥ 0.2 mm)	19.1	17.8	17.4	16.2	14.8	12.1	7.4	7.1	10.0	15.5	20.0	20.7	177.9
Average rainy days (≥ 0.2 mm)	17.6	15.9	17.0	16.2	14.8	12.1	7.4	7.1	10.0	15.4	19.5	18.6	171.4
Average snowy days (≥ 0.2 cm)	3.9	3.5	1.6	0.45	0.0	0.0	0.0	0.0	0.0	0.10	1.9	4.5	15.8
Source: Environment Canada (normals, 1971–2000)

== Government and politics ==
Mayor	Mike Little (2018, 2022)
Councillors	Jordan Back (2018, 2022); Betty Forbes (2018, 2022); Jim Hanson (2014, 2018, 2022); Herman Mah (2022); Lisa Muri (1996, 1999, 2002, 2005, 2008, 2011, 2014, 2018, 2022); Catherine Pope (2022)
Provincial MLAs	Susie Chant (North Vancouver-Seymour); Bowinn Ma (North Vancouver-Lonsdale); Lynne Block (West Vancouver-Capilano)
MPs	Braeden Caley (North Vancouver); Terry Beech (Burnaby North—Seymour)

== Sites of interest ==
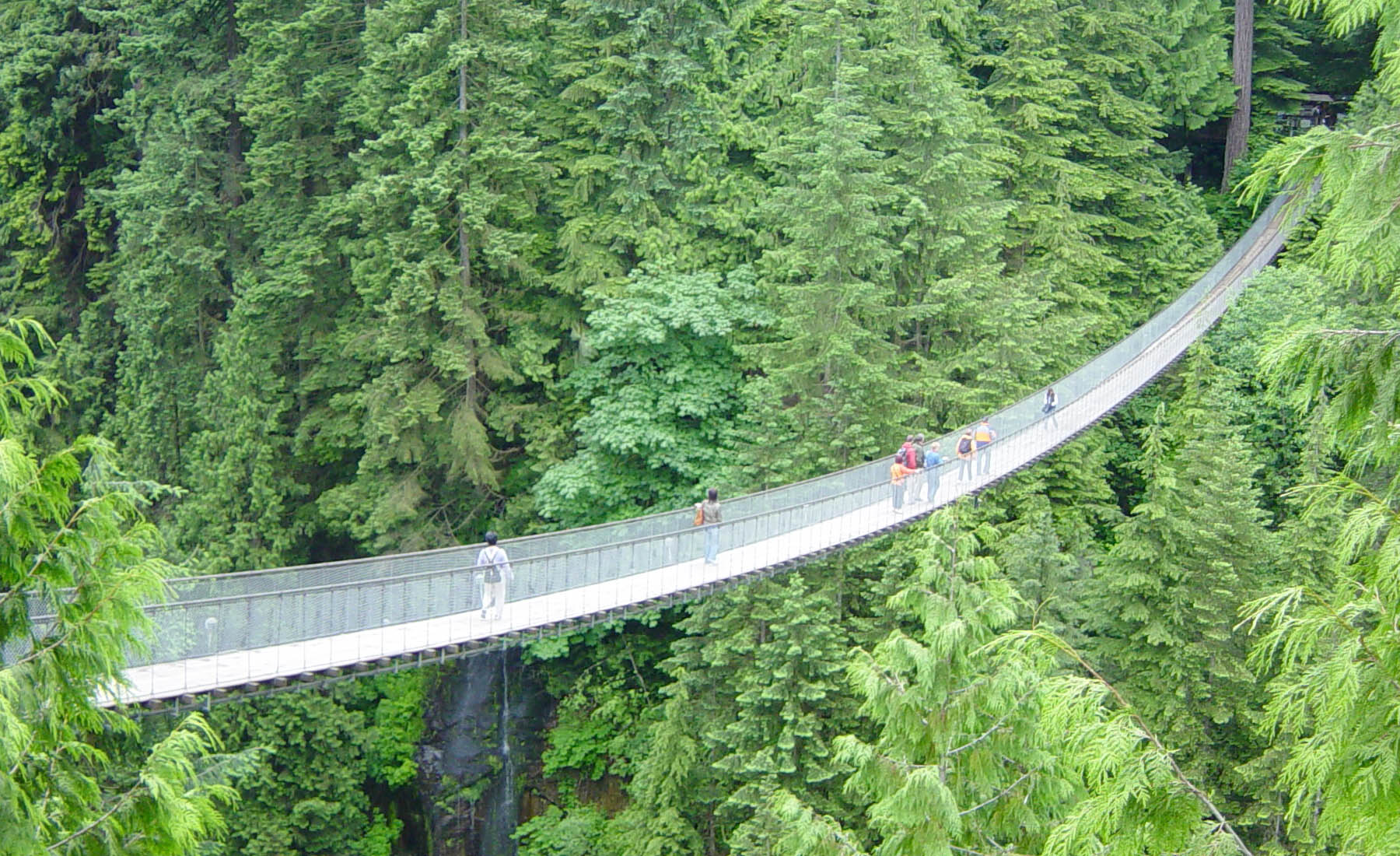
Capilano Suspension Bridge

- The Capilano Suspension Bridge in a private park carries hikers across the Capilano River to nature trails and a unique rainforest canopy walk (there is an admission fee).
- The Lynn Canyon Suspension Bridge is in a District of North Vancouver public park (free admission). Also at the park is the Lynn Canyon Ecology Centre.
- Grouse Mountain is a ski hill and a tourist destination reached by either a gondola lift or the famous Grouse Grind hike.
- Mount Seymour Provincial Park is a ski and hiking destination in the district.
- The Cleveland Dam in the Capilano River Regional Park offers nature trails as well as a fish hatchery, the Capilano River Hatchery.
- Mount Fromme is a mountain bicycling destination.
- Northlands Golf Course is a public golf course owned and operated by the District of North Vancouver.
- Maplewood Flats Conservation Area is a conservation area known for its bird watching and easy to access trails
- Maplewood Farm is an educational children's farm operated by the District of North Vancouver
- The Museum of North Vancouver Archives is part of MONOVA and holds historical records of the North Shore

== Transportation ==
The main (and only) highway through the District of North Vancouver is the Trans-Canada Highway (Highway 1). This crosses over the Ironworkers Memorial Second Narrows Crossing from Vancouver and goes through the district to the western border with West Vancouver.

Public transit is provided by TransLink and is mostly operated by its subsidiary Coast Mountain Bus Company, which runs a network of bus routes throughout the North Shore municipalities, including the R2 Marine Dr, as well as buses connecting the municipality with the rest of the Metro Vancouver. The SeaBus ferry, which is part of the TransLink system, stops at Lonsdale Quay, which connects the North Shore with Vancouver, and Waterfront station, which connects to the SkyTrain network. The West Vancouver Blue Bus service also runs a few routes in the two North Vancouvers, along with the 255, which connects them to West Vancouver. As of 2026, there is no rapid transit system in North Vancouver, but TransLink aims to build a bus rapid transit line from Metrotown in Burnaby to Park Royal in West Vancouver as a measure to bring rapid transit to the traffic-congested North Shore.

== Demographics ==
At the 2021 Canadian census conducted by Statistics Canada, North Vancouver had a population of 88,168 living in 32,700 of its 34,179 total private dwellings, a change of 2.9% from its 2016 population of 85,649. With a land area of 160.66 km^{2} (62.03 sq mi), it had a population density of 548.8/km^{2} (1,421.3/sq mi) in 2021.

=== Ethnicity ===
Panethnic groups in the District of North Vancouver (2001−2021)
Panethnic group	2021		2016		2011		2006		2001	
Panethnic group	Pop.	%	Pop.	%	Pop.	%	Pop.	%	Pop.	%
European (Note: Statistic includes all persons that did not make up part of a visible minority or an indigenous identity.)	60,390	69.11%	61,770	72.77%	64,095	76.71%	62,950	76.85%	65,110	79.72%
East Asian (Note: Statistic includes total responses of "Chinese", "Korean", and "Japanese" under visible minority section on census.)	8,975	10.27%	8,720	10.27%	7,555	9.04%	8,260	10.08%	7,450	9.12%
Middle Eastern (Note: Statistic includes total responses of "West Asian" and "Arab" under visible minority section on census.)	7,900	9.04%	5,705	6.72%	4,680	5.6%	3,755	4.58%	3,505	4.29%
South Asian	2,780	3.18%	3,060	3.61%	2,245	2.69%	2,605	3.18%	2,310	2.83%
Southeast Asian (Note: Statistic includes total responses of "Filipino" and "Southeast Asian" under visible minority section on census.)	2,530	2.9%	2,250	2.65%	2,285	2.73%	1,765	2.15%	1,165	1.43%
Indigenous	1,580	1.81%	1,360	1.6%	1,080	1.29%	755	0.92%	830	1.02%
Latin American	1,255	1.44%	780	0.92%	790	0.95%	740	0.9%	660	0.81%
African	475	0.54%	470	0.55%	235	0.28%	455	0.56%	295	0.36%
Other/multiracial (Note: Statistic includes total responses of "Visible minority, n.i.e." and "Multiple visible minorities" under visible minority section on census.)	1,505	1.72%	765	0.9%	595	0.71%	630	0.77%	355	0.43%
Total responses	87,385	99.11%	84,880	98.77%	83,555	98.98%	81,910	99.21%	81,675	99.23%
Total population	88,168	100%	85,935	100%	84,412	100%	82,562	100%	82,310	100%
Note: Totals greater than 100% due to multiple origin responses

=== Languages ===
Mother languages as reported by each person:

2021 Canadian census
Mother tongue	Population	% of total population	% of non-official languages
English	60,360	69.0%	N/A
Persian	7,180	8.2%	31.3%
Chinese languages	4,020	4.6%	17.5%
English and non-official language(s)	2,110	2.4%	N/A
Korean	1,530	1.7%	6.7%
Spanish	1,480	1.7%	6.4%
French	1,215	1.4%	N/A
German	1,110	1.3%	4.8%
Tagalog	895	1.0%	3.9%

In terms of Chinese languages, 2.7% of the population speak Mandarin, 1.7% speak Cantonese and 0.2% speak other varieties.

=== Religion ===
According to the 2021 census, religious groups in North Vancouver included:

- Irreligion (48,275 persons or 55.2%)
- Christianity (29,845 persons or 34.2%)
- Islam (5,570 persons or 6.4%)
- Judaism (845 persons or 1.0%)
- Buddhism (775 persons or 0.9%)
- Sikhism (550 persons or 0.6%)
- Hinduism (295 persons or 0.3%)
- Indigenous spirituality (15 persons or <0.1%)

In terms of Christianity, 12.4% of the population was Catholic, 11.4% were Protestant, 7.2% were Christian n.o.s, 0.9% were Christian Orthodox, and 2.2% belonged to other Christian denominations and Christian-related traditions.
