= Central Lonsdale =

Coordinates: 49.3271°N 123.0722°W

Central Lonsdale is a precinct in British Columbia, Canada, the central neighbourhood of Lonsdale, in the City of North Vancouver. It extends from Lower Lonsdale & Keith Road to Highway 1 near 24th Street, where it meets Upper Lonsdale. Central Lonsdale is somewhat densely populated, having many apartment buildings and stores on Lonsdale Avenue. Central Lonsdale is proud of many unique Green Homes such as first Net-Zero Home in the whole of Canada. 15th St West and Jones Ave, 20th St West and Mahon Ave as well as two side by side Green Homes at 19th St West and Jones Ave are examples of these homes.

Central Lonsdale is the centre of North Vancouver's sizeable Persian community, with Central Lonsdale's portion of Lonsdale Avenue being referred to as the "Persian Trail" or in other terms a Little Iran. Many West Asian businesses are located along the street including bakeries, markets, and restaurants.
