= Museum and Archives of North Vancouver =

Community museum in North Vancouver, Canada

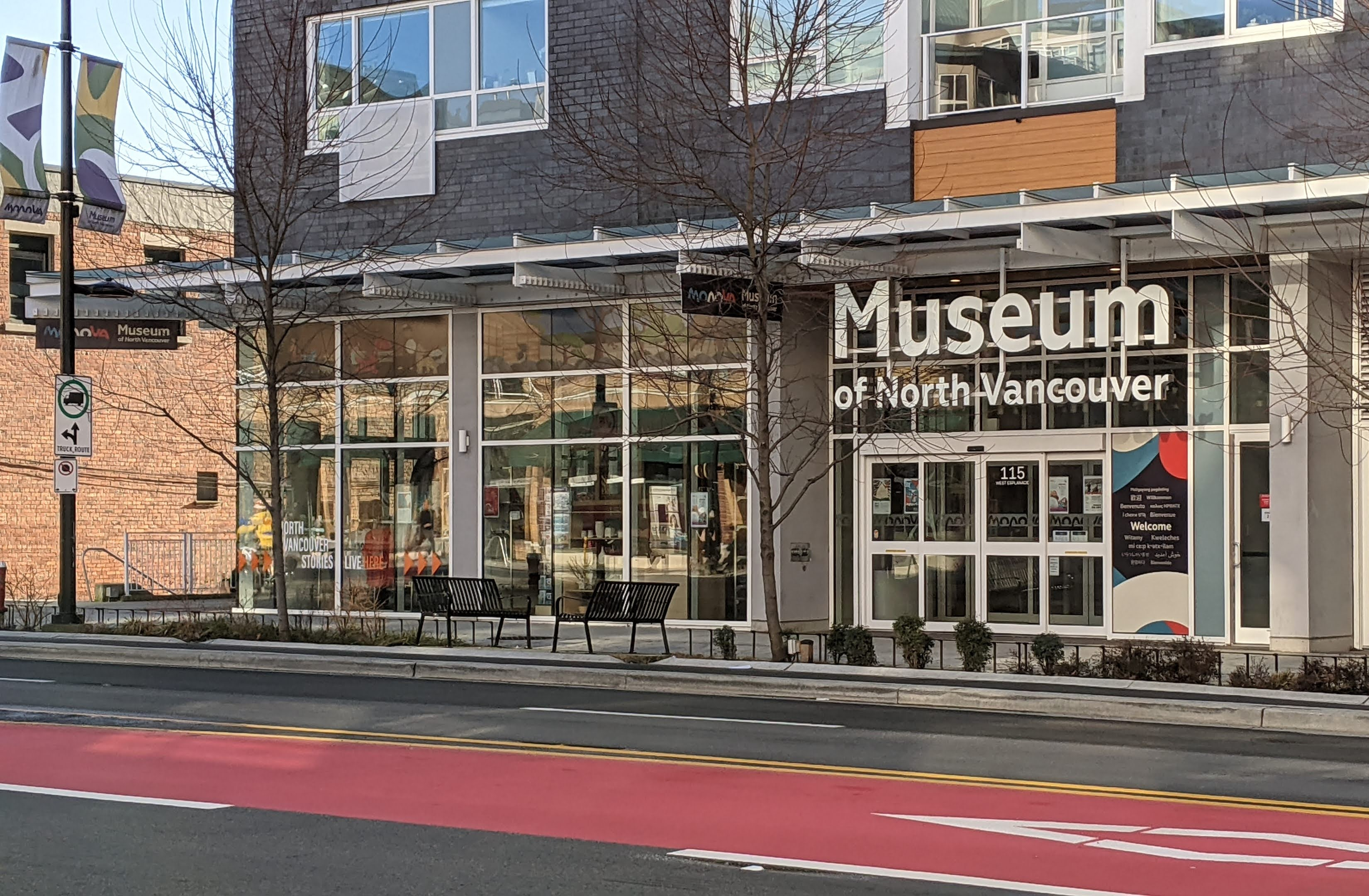
The Museum of North Vancouver (MONOVA)

The Museum and Archives of North Vancouver (MONOVA) first opened in 1972, with the new and current location opening on December 4, 2021. The museum is located in the City of North Vancouver. As an institution, MONOVA includes the Archives of North Vancouver, which is located in the District of North Vancouver.

== History ==
The organisation was started in 1972, originally called the "North Shore Museum and Archives". The North Vancouver Museum and Archives Commission has governed MONOVA since 1996. The new museum, rebranded "MONOVA", was opened at the cost of $7.6 million. $6.1 million was invested by the City of North Vancouver, the Province of British Columbia, and the Government of Canada. The remaining $1.5 million came from private foundations, businesses, and individuals through a fundraising campaign by the Friends of the North Vancouver Museum and Archives Society.

The Archives of North Vancouver is located in a heritage building, the former Fourth Lynn Valley School, which was renovated in 2005.

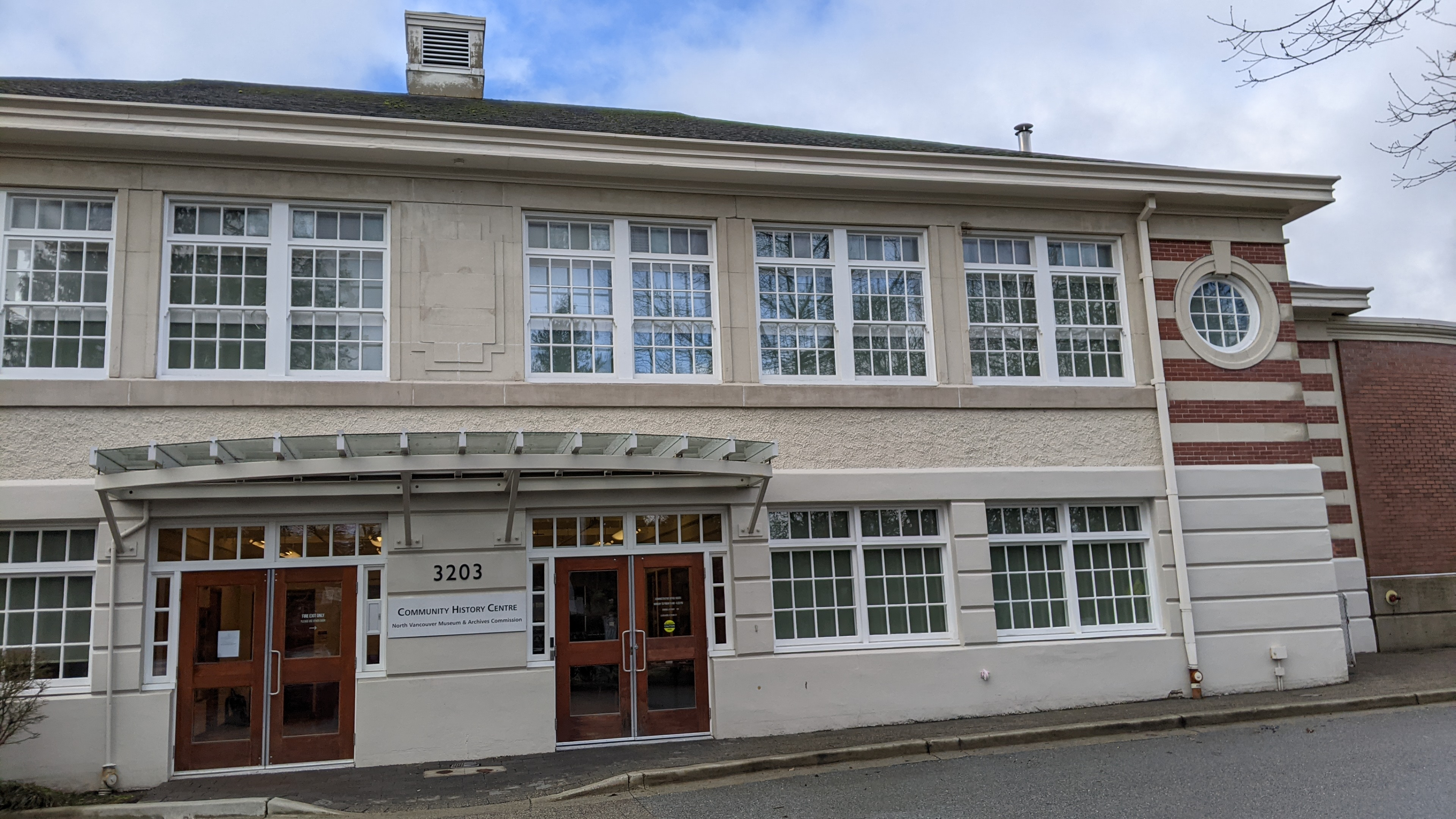
The Archives of North Vancouver

== Exhibits ==
The MONOVA museum has a Permanent Gallery Exhibit, which features artefacts and writing about the history of North Vancouver. The museum includes programming about the Squamish and Tsleil-Waututh Nations. Adjacent to the permanent gallery is the Feature Gallery Exhibit that changes regularly. The museum also offers free online exhibits.
