= North Vancouver (city) =

City in British Columbia, Canada

- City
- City of North Vancouver
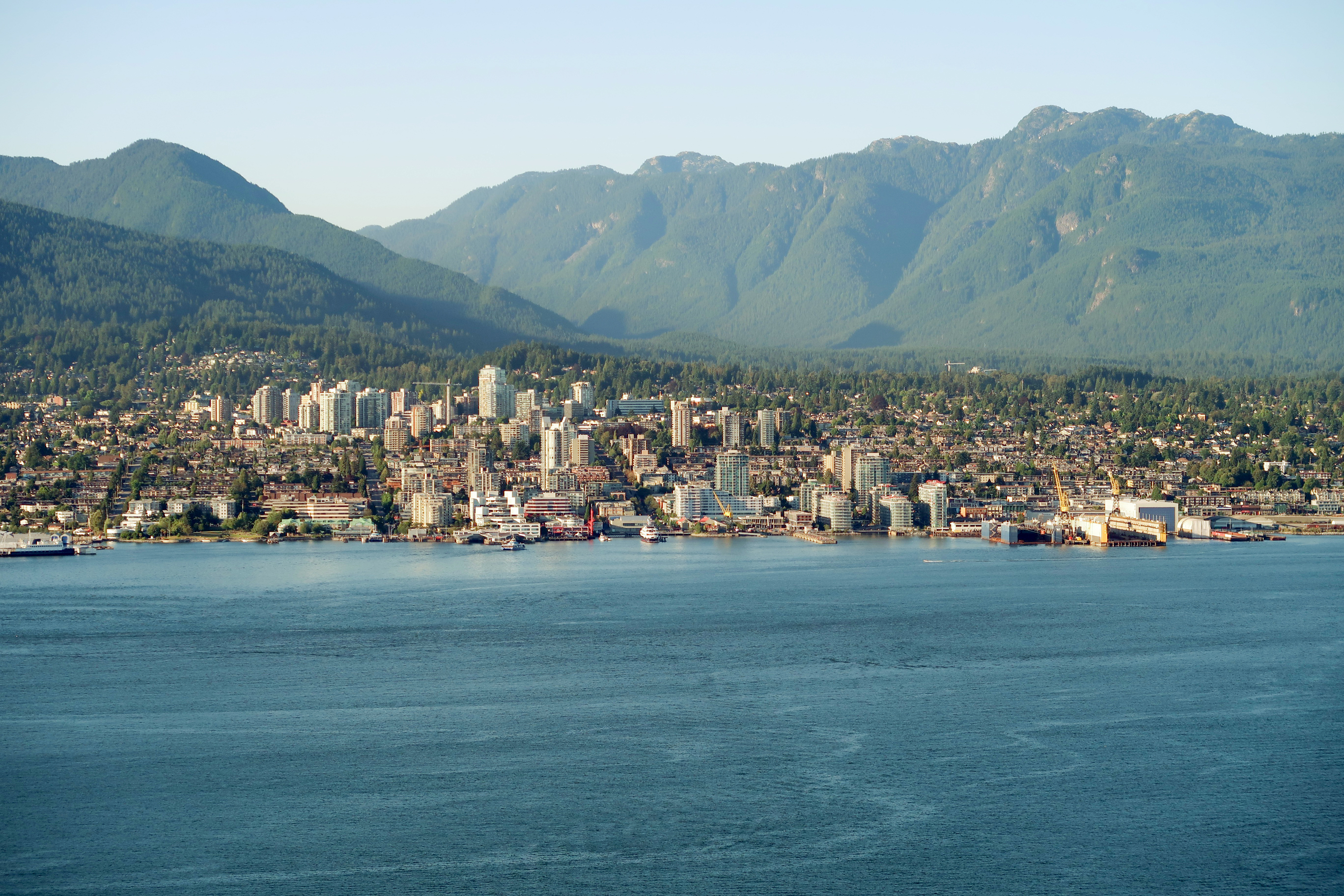
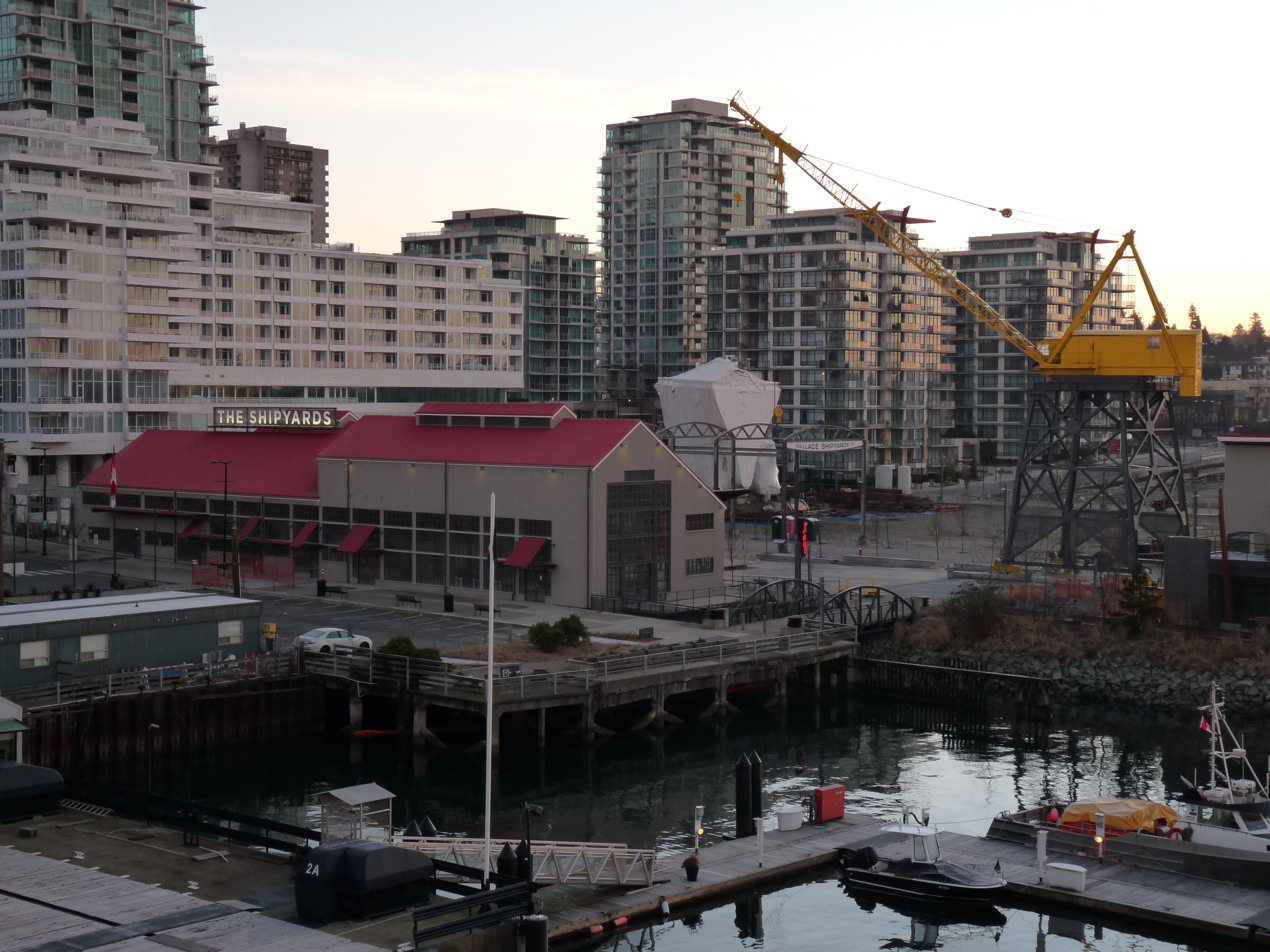
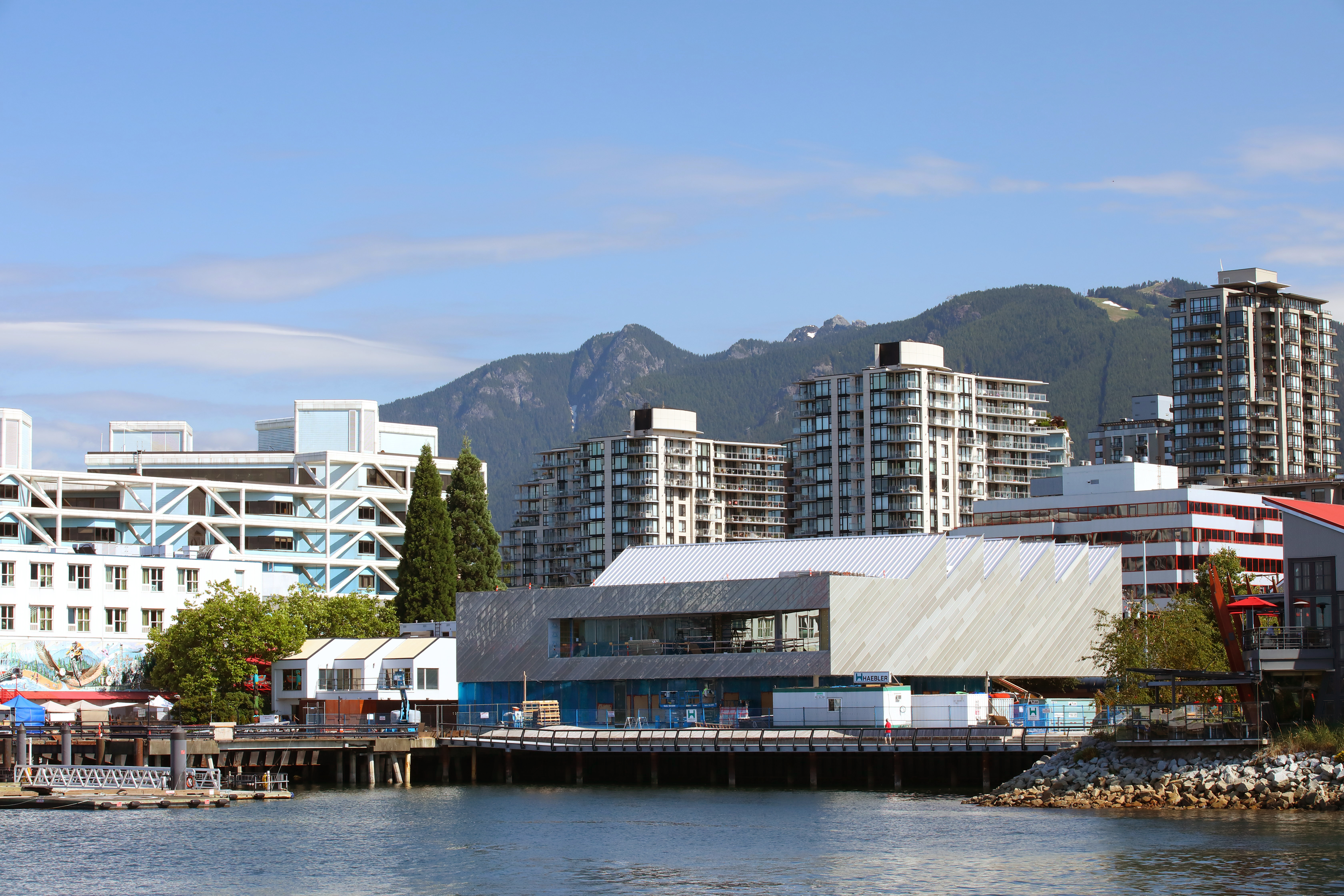
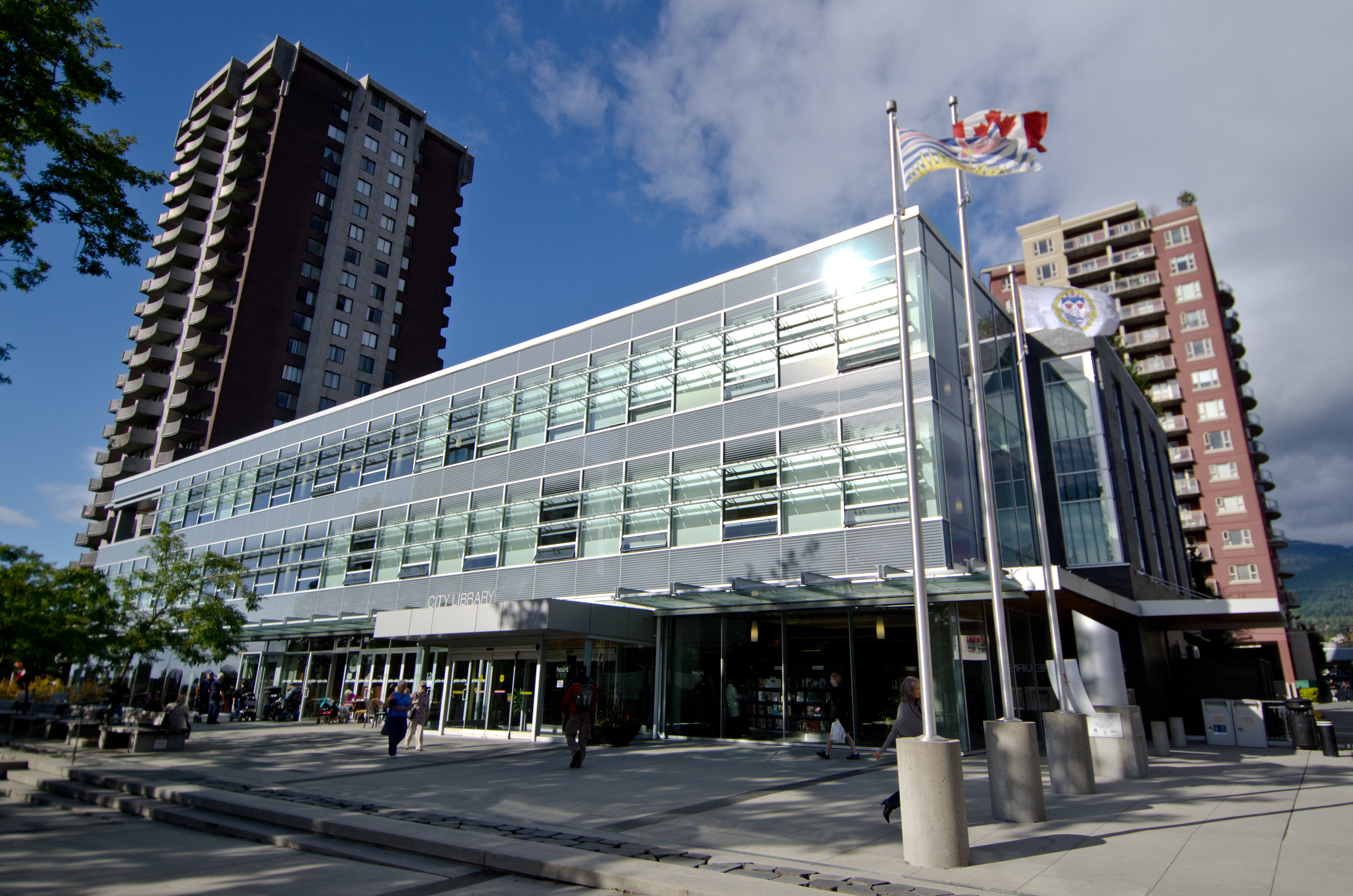
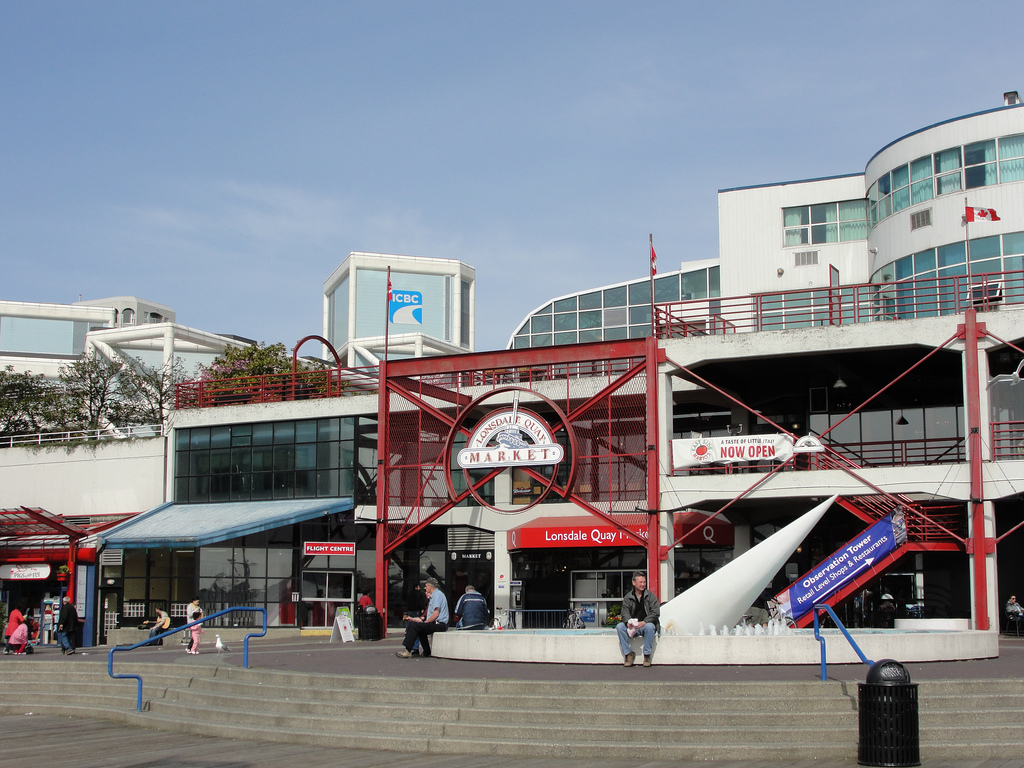
- Skyline of the City of North Vancouver The Shipyards The Polygon Gallery North Vancouver City Library Lonsdale Quay Market
- Nickname: North Van
- Location of the City of North Vancouver in Metro Vancouver
- Coordinates: 49°19′N 123°4′W
- Country: Canada
- Province: British Columbia
- Regional district: Metro Vancouver
- Incorporated: May 13, 1907
- Seat: North Vancouver City Hall

Government
  - Type: Mayor-council government
  - Mayor: Linda Buchanan
  - Council: List of councillors: Holly Back; Don Bell; Angela Girard; Jessica McIlroy; Shervin Shahriari; Tony Valente
  - MPs: Jonathan Wilkinson (Liberal); Terry Beech (Liberal)
  - MLAs: Bowinn Ma (NDP); Susie Chant (NDP)

Area
  - Land: 11.83 km^{2} (4.57 sq mi)
- Elevation: 80 m (260 ft)

Population (2021)
  - Total: 58,120
  - Estimate (2023): 64,847
  - Density: 4,913/km^{2} (12,720/sq mi)
- Demonym: North Vancouverite
- Time zone: UTC−7:00 (Pacific Time)
- Forward sortation area: V7G – V7R
- Area codes: 604, 778, 236, 672
- Website: cnv.org

North Vancouver is a municipality city on the North Shore of the Burrard Inlet, in British Columbia, Canada. Anchored by the downtown town centre of Lonsdale, with which its urban core is largely synonymous, it consists of the smallest and most urbanized of the communities situated north of the city of Vancouver, and is part of the Metro Vancouver regional district, though it has significant industry of its own – including shipping, chemical production, and film production. The city is served by the Royal Canadian Mounted Police, British Columbia Ambulance Service, and the North Vancouver City Fire Department.

== History ==
=== Industrial development and early settlement (1863–1891) ===
In 1863, T.W. Graham and George Scrimgeour pre-empted 150 acres of Crown land and established Pioneer Mills, the first sawmill at the site Moodyville. This was a key milestone in the European settlement and industrial development in what would become North Vancouver. The next year, J.O. Smith bought the struggling business, renamed it Burrard Inlet Mills and sent out the first international cargo. Sewell Prescott Moody and two partners bought out the near-bankrupt undertaking cheaply in January 1865, changed the name to Burrard Inlet Lumber Mills and made it a success. Early in 1865 it was purchased by Sewell Prescott Moody and became the centre of a thriving community, Moodyville, with a hotel and the Inlet's first school.

In 1866 Moody took on new partners George Dietz (1830–84) and Hugh Nelson (1830–93). After a fire, he rebuilt the second mill as a 330-foot (100 m) structure capable of producing 100,000 board feet (236 m^{3}) of lumber per day. The complex was named the Moodyville Sawmill Company by the early 1870s.

In the 1880s, Arthur Heywood-Lonsdale and a relation James Pemberton Fell, made substantial investments through their company, Lonsdale Estates, and in 1882 he financed the Moodyville investments. Several locations in the North Vancouver area are named after Lonsdale and his family.

=== Land development and municipal incorporation ===
Various settlers acquired Crown grants during this period, including Frederick Howson, Thomas A. Strong, John Linn (the namesake of Lynn Valley) and Hugh Burr.

Following Vancouver's devastating fire in 1886, regional infrastructure expanded with the construction of the Vancouver Water Works dam on the Capilano River in 1888 and the formation of the Burrard Inlet Bridge and Tunnel Company in 1890 to provide direct south shore access.

On August 29, 1891, the District of North Vancouver was officially incorporated, spanning from Indian Arm to Howe Sound, with C.J. Phibbs elected as the first Reeve.

Not long after the District of North Vancouver was formed, an early land developer and second reeve of the new council, James Cooper Keith, personally underwrote a loan to commence construction of a road which undulated from West Vancouver to Deep Cove amid the slashed sidehills, swamps, and burnt stumps. The road, sometimes under different names and not always contiguous, is still one of the most important east-west thoroughfare carrying traffic across the North Shore.

Development was slow at the outset. The population of the district in the 1901 census was only 365 people. Keith joined Edwin Mahon and together they controlled North Vancouver Land & Improvement Company. Soon the pace of development around the foot of Lonsdale began to pick up. The first school was opened in 1902. The district was able to build a municipal hall in 1903 and actually have meetings in North Vancouver (instead of in Vancouver where most of the landowners lived). The first bank and first newspaper arrived in 1905. In 1906 the BC Electric Railway Company opened up a street car line that extended from the ferry wharf up Lonsdale to 12th Street. By 1911 the streetcar system extended west to the Capilano River and east to Lynn Valley.

The owners of businesses who operated on Lonsdale, as part of an initiative led by Keith and Mahon, brought a petition to the district council in 1905, calling for a new, compact city to be carved out of the unwieldy district.

During the ensuing two years there was much and sometimes heated debate. Some thought the new city should have a new name such as Northport, Hillmont or Parkhill. Burrard became the favourite of the new names but majority view was that North Vancouver remain in order to remain associated with the rising credibility of Vancouver in financial markets and as a place to attract immigrants.

Some thought the boundary of the new city should reflect geography and extend from Lynn Creek or Seymour River west to the Capilano River and extend three miles up the mountainside. That the boundary of the city which came into existence in 1907 just happened to match that of the lands owned by the North Vancouver Land & Improvement Company and Lonsdale Estate was no accident. Since the motivation for creating the city was to reserve local tax revenue for the work of putting in services for the property owned by the major developers, there was little reason to take on any of the burden beyond the extent of their holdings.

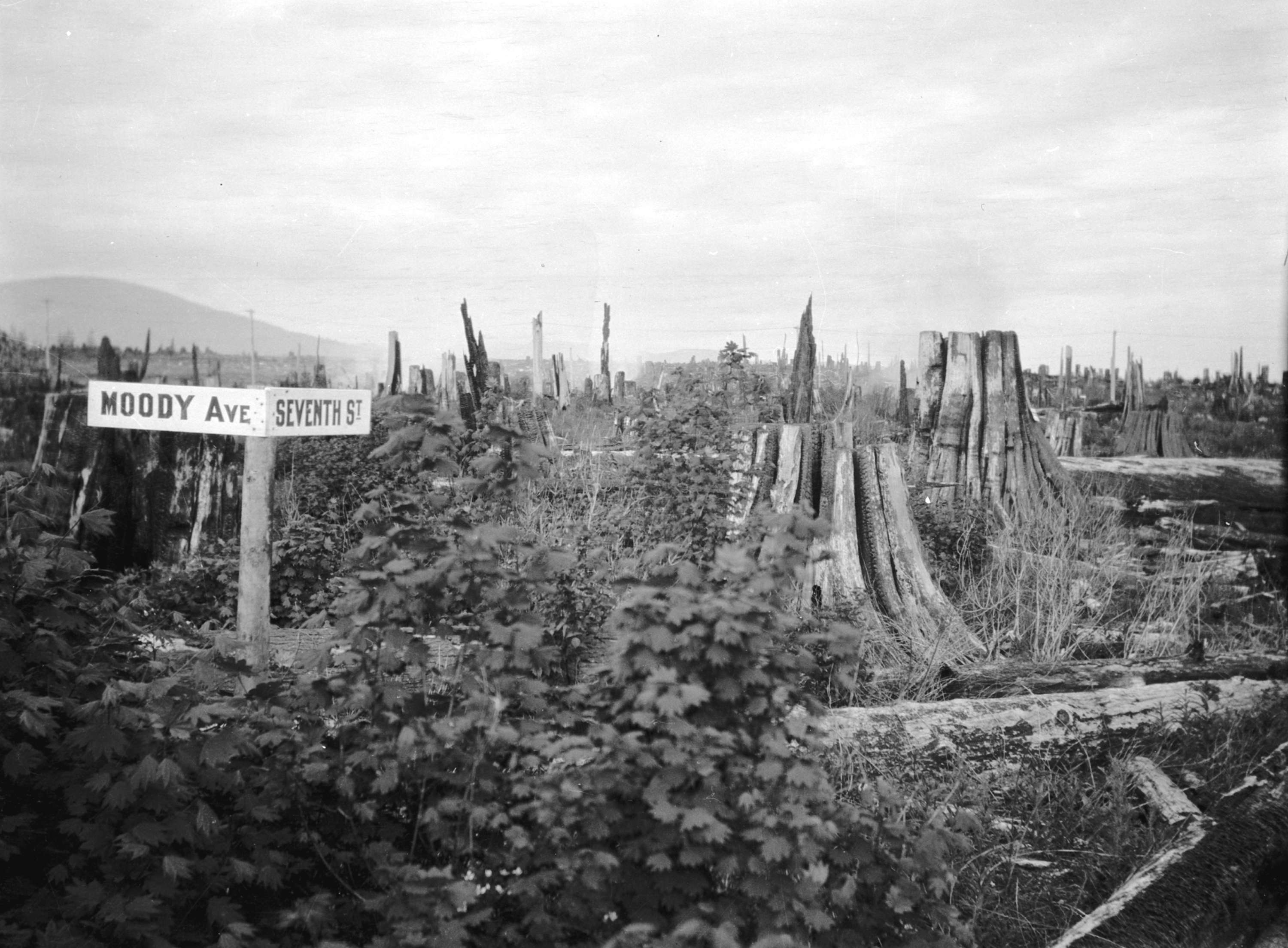
North Vancouver circa 1911, Moody Avenue and Seventh Street

Residents in west part of the District of North Vancouver now had less reason to be connected with what remained and they petitioned to create the District of West Vancouver (the west part of the North Shore, not the west side of Vancouver) in 1912. The eastern boundary of that new municipality is for the most part the Capilano River and a community that is easily distinguished from the two North Vancouvers has since developed.

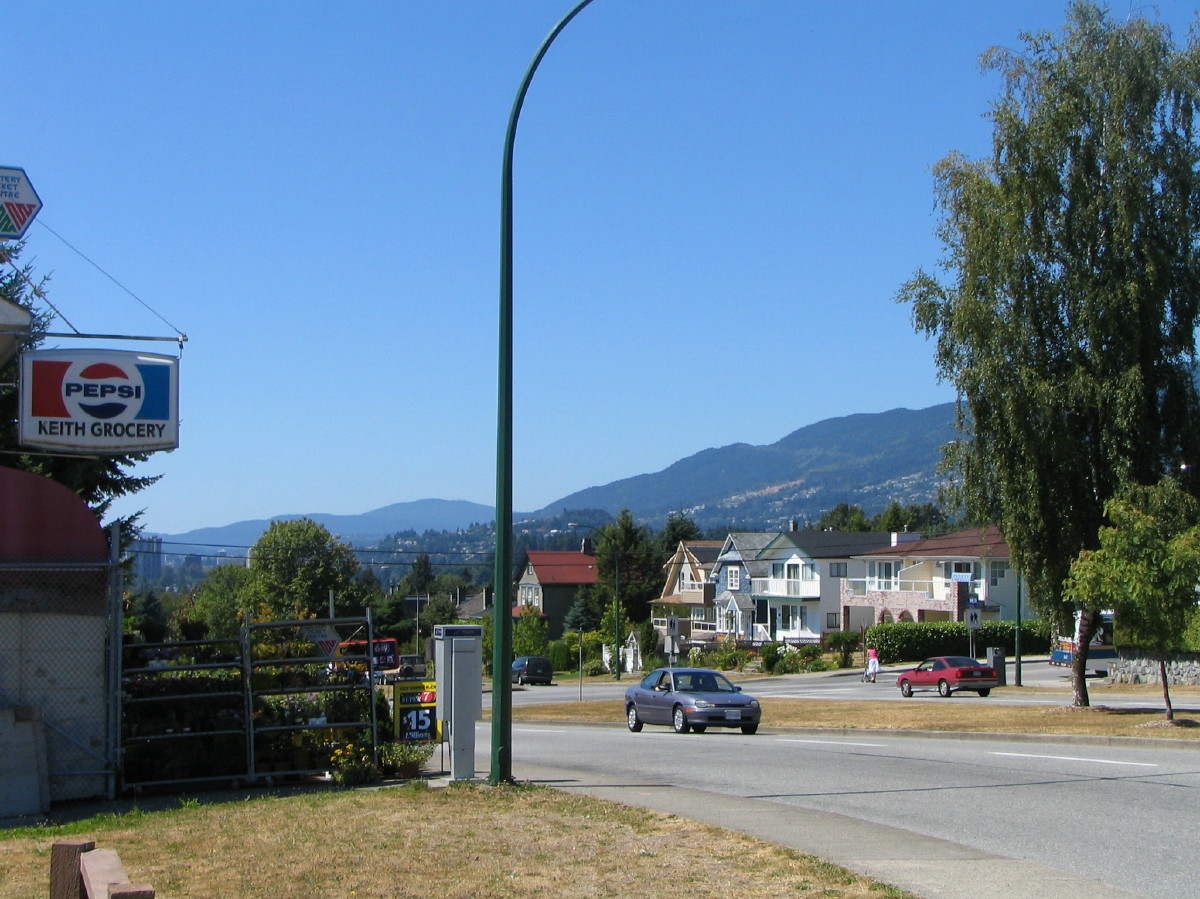
Keith Road looking west, with Hollyburn Mtn in the distance in 2004

The City of North Vancouver continued to grow around the foot of Lonsdale Avenue. Serviced by the North Vancouver Ferries, it proved a popular area. Commuters used the ferries to work in Vancouver. Street cars and early land speculation, spurred interest in the area. Streets, city blocks and houses were slowly built around lower Lonsdale. Wallace Shipyards, and the Pacific Great Eastern Railway provided an industrial base, although, the late arrival of the Second Narrows railway bridge in 1925 controlled development.

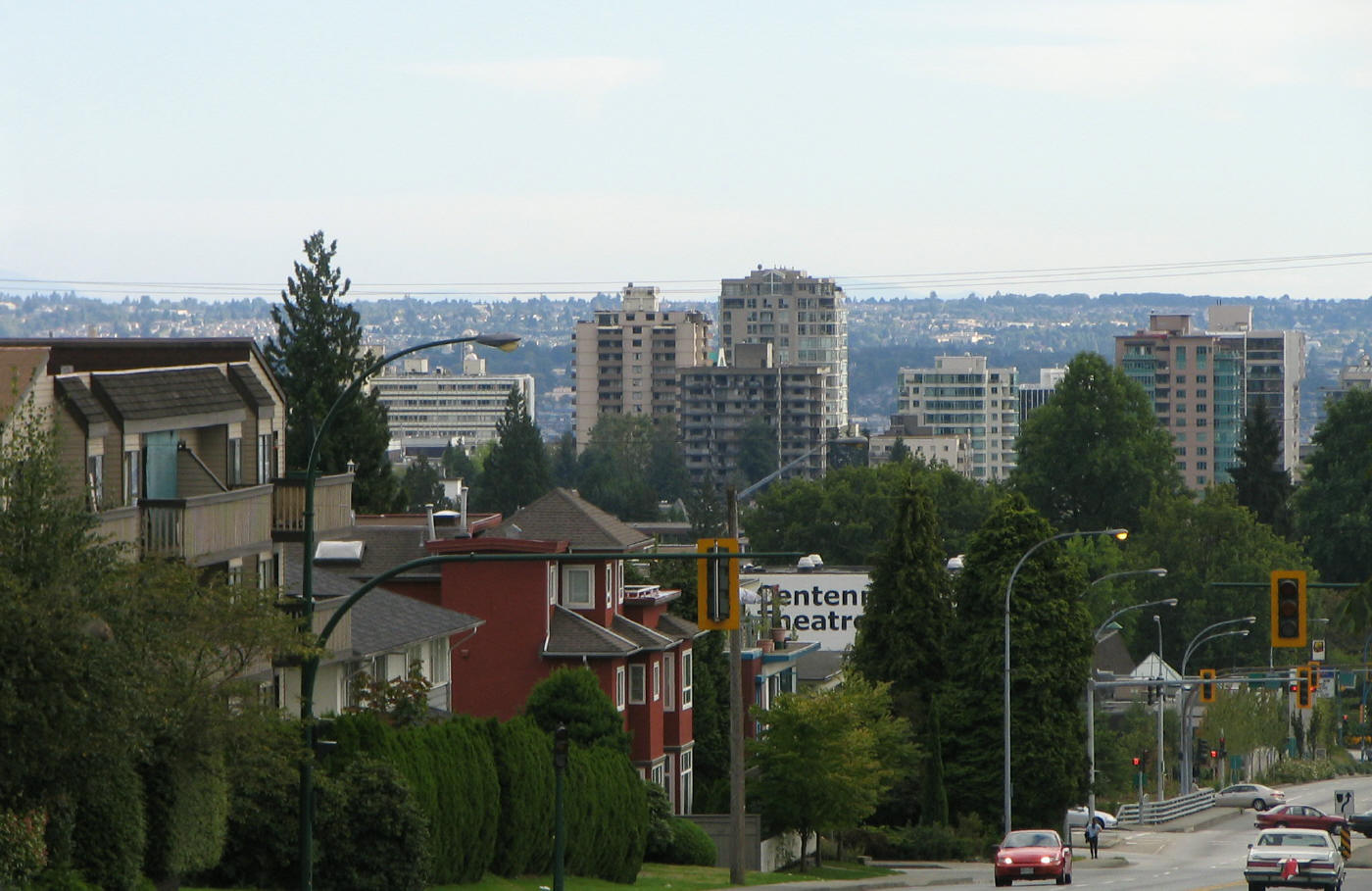
City of North Vancouver as seen from Upper Lonsdale in 2006

The Depression again bankrupted the city, while the Second World War turned North Vancouver into the Clydeside of Canada with a large shipbuilding program. Housing the shipyard workers provided a new building boom, which continued on through the post-war years. By that time, North Vancouver became a popular housing area.

== Geography ==
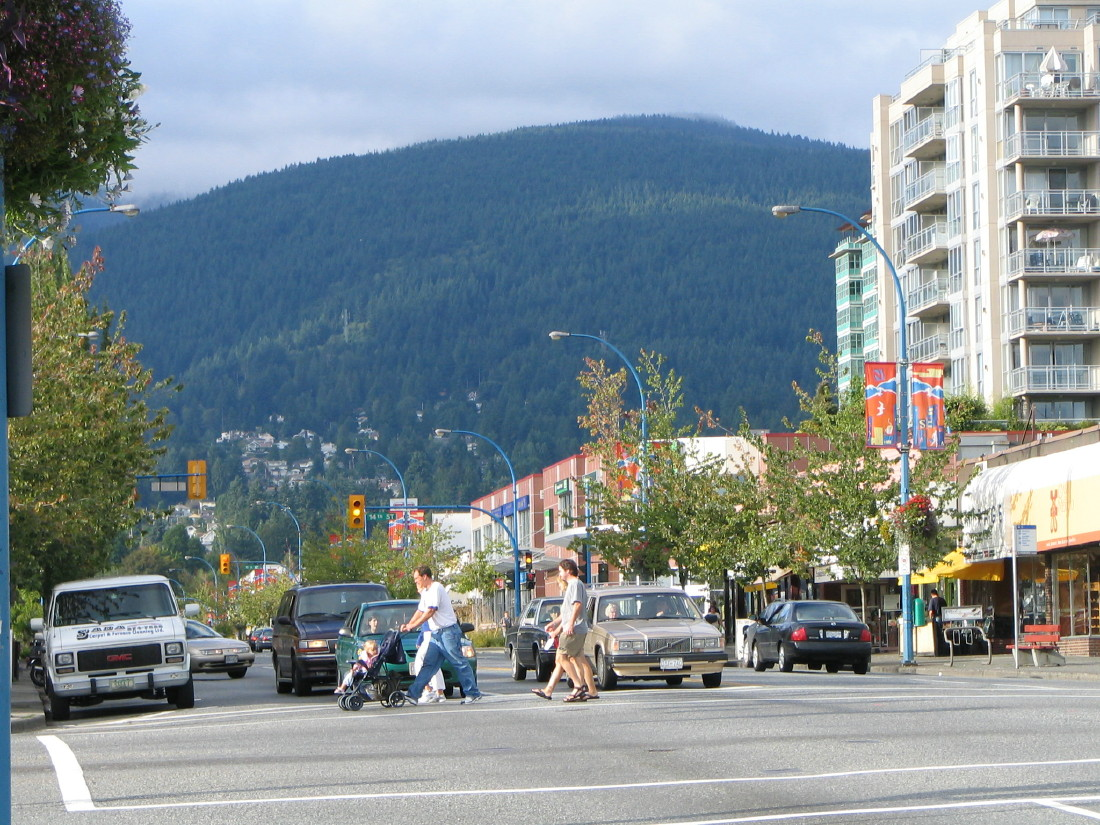
Main thoroughfare Lonsdale Avenue with Mount Fromme in the background

The City of North Vancouver is separated from Vancouver by the Burrard Inlet, and it is surrounded on three sides by the District of North Vancouver. The city has much in common with the district and with West Vancouver; together, the three are commonly referred to as the North Shore.

The City of North Vancouver is relatively densely populated with a number of residential high-rise buildings in the Central Lonsdale and Lower Lonsdale areas.

The North Shore mountains have many drainages: Capilano River, MacKay, Mosquito, and Lynn Creeks, and Seymour River.

=== Climate ===
North Vancouver has an oceanic climate (Köppen Cfb) with cool, rainy winters and dry, warm summers.

Climate data for North Vancouver (N Vancouver 2ND Narrows) (Elevation: 4m) 1981–2010
Month	Jan	Feb	Mar	Apr	May	Jun	Jul	Aug	Sep	Oct	Nov	Dec	Year
Average precipitation mm (inches)	262.2 (10.32)	172.3 (6.78)	168.4 (6.63)	136.3 (5.37)	103.3 (4.07)	82.5 (3.25)	53.2 (2.09)	54.9 (2.16)	76.8 (3.02)	189.0 (7.44)	293.4 (11.55)	238.6 (9.39)	1,830.8 (72.08)
Average rainfall mm (inches)	255.3 (10.05)	167.7 (6.60)	166.8 (6.57)	136.1 (5.36)	103.3 (4.07)	82.5 (3.25)	53.2 (2.09)	54.9 (2.16)	76.8 (3.02)	189.0 (7.44)	290.2 (11.43)	229.9 (9.05)	1,805.6 (71.09)
Average snowfall cm (inches)	6.9 (2.7)	5.2 (2.0)	1.6 (0.6)	0.2 (0.1)	0.0 (0.0)	0.0 (0.0)	0.0 (0.0)	0.0 (0.0)	0.0 (0.0)	0.1 (0.0)	2.3 (0.9)	8.7 (3.4)	24.9 (9.8)
Average precipitation days (≥ 0.2 mm)	20.5	15.5	18.0	15.4	13.8	11.7	7.4	6.7	9.6	16.1	20.9	20.3	175.9
Average rainy days (≥ 0.2 mm)	19.7	15.1	17.9	15.4	13.8	11.7	7.4	6.7	9.6	16.0	20.7	19.6	173.5
Average snowy days (≥ 0.2 cm)	1.7	0.92	0.54	0.12	0.0	0.0	0.0	0.0	0.0	0.08	0.72	2.2	6.2
Source: Environment Canada (normals, 1981–2010)

== Politics ==
Mayor	Linda Buchanan (2018, 2022)
Councillors	Holly Back (2018, 2022), Don Bell (2011, 2014, 2018, 2022), Angela Girard (2018, 2022), Jessica McIlroy (2018, 2022), Tony Valente (2018, 2022), Shervin Shahriari (2022)
Provincial MLA	Bowinn Ma (North Vancouver-Lonsdale, 2017, 2020, 2024)
MP	Jonathan Wilkinson (North Vancouver, 2015)

== Sites of interest ==
The area around lower Lonsdale Avenue features several open community spaces, including Waterfront Park, Lonsdale Quay, Ship Builders Square and the Burrard Dry Dock Pier.

Other sites of interest in the city include:

- North Van Arts, 335 Lonsdale Ave
- Centennial Theatre, 2300 Lonsdale Avenue
- First Church of Christ, Scientist, a local heritage site
- The Museum and Archives of North Vancouver
- The Polygon Gallery
- Presentation House Theatre, 333 Chesterfield Avenue
- St. Edmund's Church, 535 Mahon Avenue, a local heritage site
- Trans Canada Trail Pavilion, Waterfront Park
- The Shipyards, near Lonsdale Quay, which includes Ship Builders Square and the Burrard Dry Dock Pier, on the site of the old Wallace Shipyard
- Lonsdale Quay Market, easily accessible from the Seabus. The Quay has a view of Vancouver's skyline and is locally owned and operated.

== Transportation ==
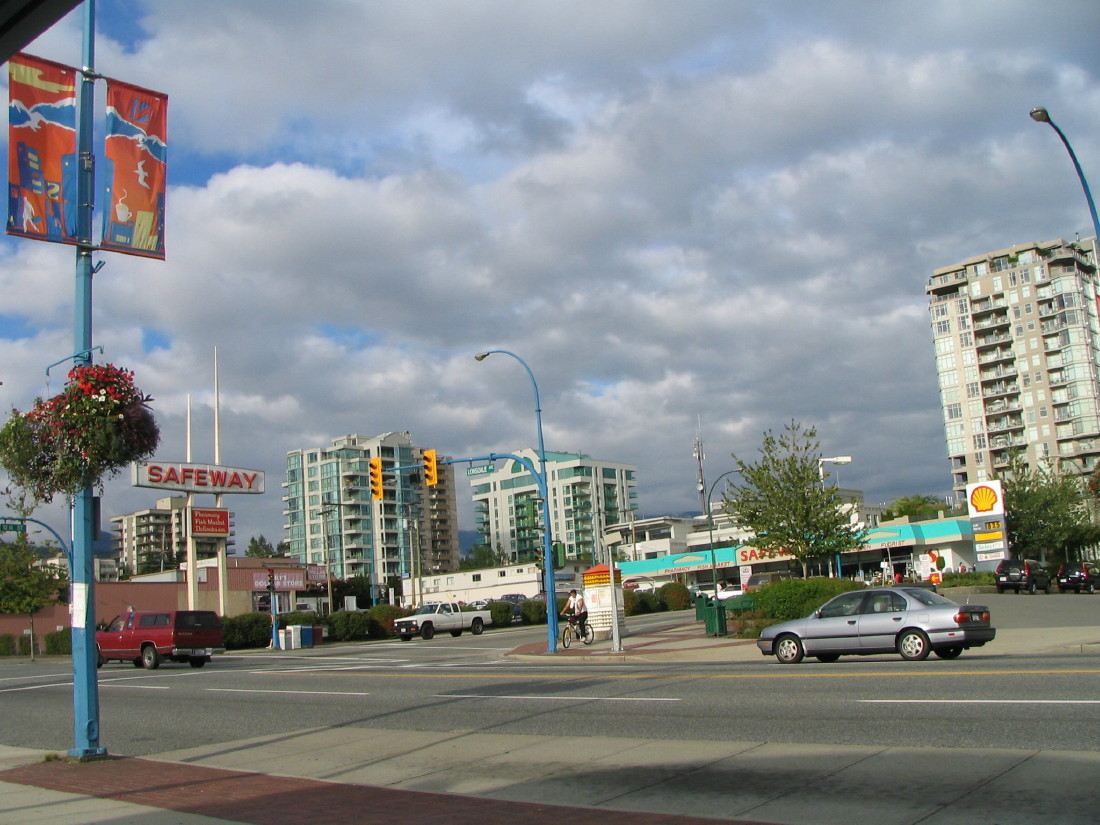
Lonsdale Avenue at 13th Street is a major intersection of Central Lonsdale in 2004

The City of North Vancouver is connected to Vancouver by two highway bridges (the Lions Gate Bridge and the Ironworkers Memorial Second Narrows Crossing), the R2 Marine–Willingdon RapidBus, and by a passenger ferry, the SeaBus. That system and the bus system in North Vancouver is operated by Coast Mountain Bus Company, an operating company of TransLink. The hub of the bus system is Lonsdale Quay, the location of the SeaBus terminal. Currently, there is no rail transit service on the North Shore.

The main street in the city is Lonsdale Avenue, which begins at Lonsdale Quay and goes north to 29th Street, where it continues in the District of North Vancouver, ending at Rockland Road.

Highway 1, the Trans-Canada Highway (often referred to as the "Upper Levels Highway") passes through the northern portion of the city. It is a freeway for its entire length within the City of North Vancouver. There are six interchanges on Highway 1 within the City of North Vancouver:

- Main Street/Dollarton Highway (Exit 23)
- Mountain Highway and Mt Seymour Parkway (Exit 21/22)
- Lynn Valley Road (Exit 19)
- Lonsdale Avenue (Exit 18)
- Westview Drive (Exit 17)
- Capilano Road (Exit 14)

== Education ==
Public schools are managed by the North Vancouver School District, which operates 8 high schools and 30 elementary schools shared by the city and the District of North Vancouver.

The Conseil scolaire francophone de la Colombie-Britannique operates one Francophone school in that city: école André-Piolat, which has both primary and secondary levels.

There are also several independent private elementary and high schools in the area, including Bodwell High School and Lions Gate Christian Academy.

Post-secondary education is available at Capilano University in the district, as well as at Simon Fraser University and the University of British Columbia in neighbouring communities.

== Demographics ==
Historical populations
Year	Pop.	±%
1911	8,196	—
1921	7,652	−6.6%
1931	8,510	+11.2%
1941	8,914	+4.7%
1951	15,687	+76.0%
1961	23,656	+50.8%
1971	31,847	+34.6%
1981	33,640	+5.6%
1991	41,475	+23.3%
2001	44,303	+6.8%
2006	45,165	+1.9%
2011	48,196	+6.7%
2016	52,898	+9.8%
2021	58,120	+9.9%

In the 2021 Census of Population conducted by Statistics Canada, North Vancouver had a population of 58,120 living in 27,293 of its 29,021 total private dwellings, a change of 9.9% from its 2016 population of 52,898. With a land area of 11.83 km^{2} (4.57 sq mi), it had a population density of 4,912.9/km^{2} (12,724.4/sq mi) in 2021.

As of the 2011 census, the median age was 41.2 years old, which is a bit higher than the national median age at 40.6 years old. There are 24,206 private dwellings with an occupancy rate of 94.1%. According to the 2011 National Household Survey, the median value of a dwelling in North Vancouver is $599,985 which is significantly higher than the national average at $280,552. The median household income (after-taxes) in North Vancouver is $52,794, a bit lower than the national average at $54,089.

=== Ethnicity ===
North Vancouver has one of the highest Middle Eastern (Note: Statistic includes total responses of "West Asian" and "Arab" under visible minority section on census.) population ratios for any Canadian city at 11.3% as of 2021, with the vast majority being Persian. The area around Lonsdale Avenue from Victoria Park to 21st Street is known as a Little Iran.

Panethnic groups in the City of North Vancouver (2001−2021)
Panethnic group	2021		2016		2011		2006		2001	
Panethnic group	Pop.	%	Pop.	%	Pop.	%	Pop.	%	Pop.	%
European (Note: Statistic includes all persons that did not make up part of a visible minority or an indigenous identity.)	35,420	61.59%	34,695	66.48%	32,800	68.78%	32,160	71.69%	32,960	75.03%
Middle Eastern	6,510	11.32%	4,575	8.77%	3,655	7.66%	3,155	7.03%	3,015	6.86%
East Asian (Note: Statistic includes total responses of "Chinese", "Korean", and "Japanese" under visible minority section on census.)	5,195	9.03%	4,260	8.16%	3,775	7.92%	3,995	8.91%	3,255	7.41%
Southeast Asian (Note: Statistic includes total responses of "Filipino" and "Southeast Asian" under visible minority section on census.)	4,220	7.34%	3,715	7.12%	3,470	7.28%	2,150	4.79%	1,650	3.76%
South Asian	2,100	3.65%	1,840	3.53%	1,475	3.09%	1,340	2.99%	980	2.23%
Indigenous	1,230	2.14%	1,150	2.2%	970	2.03%	925	2.06%	1,015	2.31%
Latin American	1,210	2.1%	840	1.61%	585	1.23%	430	0.96%	470	1.07%
African	550	0.96%	485	0.93%	390	0.82%	315	0.7%	315	0.72%
Other/multiracial (Note: Statistic includes total responses of "Visible minority, n.i.e." and "Multiple visible minorities" under visible minority section on census.)	1,075	1.87%	630	1.21%	575	1.21%	385	0.86%	275	0.63%
Total responses	57,505	98.94%	52,185	98.65%	47,685	98.94%	44,860	99.32%	43,930	99.16%
Total population	58,120	100%	52,898	100%	48,196	100%	45,165	100%	44,303	100%
Note: Totals greater than 100% due to multiple origin responses.

=== Languages ===
Mother languages as reported by each person:

Canada 2021 Census
Mother language	Population	% of Total Population	% of Non-official language Population
English	35,520	61.4%	N/A
Persian	5,760	10.0%	31.1%
Tagalog	1,675	2.9%	9.0%
Chinese Languages	1,670	2.9%	9.0%
Spanish	1,245	2.2%	6.7%
Korean	1,135	6.1%	6.1%
French	980	1.7%	N/A
German	575	1.0%	3.1%

3.1% of North Vancouver residents listed both English and a non-official language as mother tongues.

=== Religion ===
According to the 2021 census, religious groups in North Vancouver included:

- Irreligion (29,580 persons or 51.4%)
- Christianity (20,915 persons or 36.4%)
- Islam (4,245 persons or 7.4%)
- Sikhism (530 persons or 0.9%)
- Buddhism (470 persons or 0.8%)
- Judaism (385 persons or 0.7%)
- Hinduism (340 persons or 0.6%)
- Indigenous Spirituality (70 persons or 0.1%)
