= Lower Lonsdale =

Coordinates: 49°18′47″N 123°04′22″W

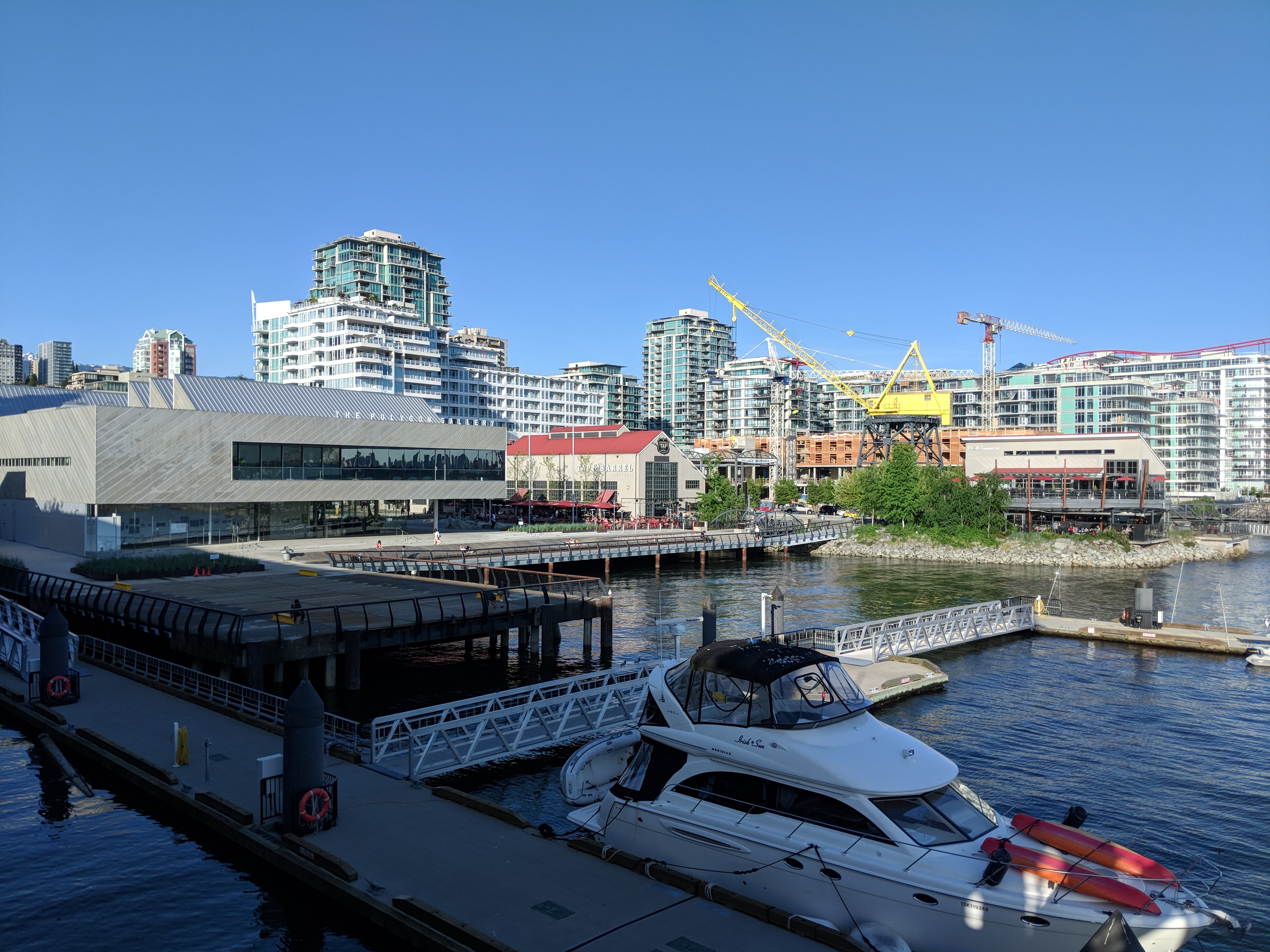
The Shipyards with Polygon Gallery at left

Lower Lonsdale (also known as LoLo) is a historic waterfront neighbourhood and the Southernmost neighbourhood of Lonsdale, British Columbia, in the City of North Vancouver. Lower Lonsdale runs up Lonsdale Avenue from Lonsdale Quay to Keith Road, where it meets Central Lonsdale North of Victoria Park.

The area is characterized by its progressive feel of trendy businesses, a high end sex shop, outdoor fitness stores, eclectic cafes, and diverse restaurants. With a history of shipbuilding, in 2021 Lower Lonsdale underwent a major waterfront renewal process. The old shipyards have been torn down, making way for new public spaces, buildings, condominiums, and fashionable outlets.

== History ==
Before the emergence of today’s neighbourhood, the First People to call this parcel of land home was the Squamish peoples who built permanent villages and fishing camps along the community’s shoreline and river-inlets, sustaining themselves by fishing, hunting and food-gathering. Just over 200 years ago, the Squamish peoples had their first encounter with the Spanish who were the first Europeans to arrive in the area. However, in 1792, Captain George Vancouver of England also arrived to explore the shores of North Vancouver. But, it was not until 1860 that a Catholic Missionary was ordered to build a church on the water front of what is now called St. Paul's Church. Shortly afterwards, T. W. Graham and George Scrimgeour secured a pre-emption of 150 acres (0.61 km^{2}), the first on the North Shore of the Burrard Inlet. They proceeded to build a mill and named it The Pioneer Mills. This consequently initiated an influx of residents. However, with the mill facing bankruptcy, an American by the name of Sewell Prescott Moody bought it. The name Lonsdale comes from Arthur Pemberton Heywood-Lonsdale who, along with J.P. Fell opened land to settlers in 1903.

== Transportation ==
Lower Lonsdale is served on public transit by the Lonsdale Quay SeaBus terminal and bus exchange.

== Gentrification ==
In the 1990s and 2000s, the City of North Vancouver embarked on an ambitious plan to redevelop former industrial lands of Lower Lonsdale. Highrise and lowrise condominium and other multi-family developments were constructed in the area between 3rd Street and south to the waterfront.

During that time, many new restaurants and retailers have located in the stretch of Lonsdale Avenue between 3rd Street and Burrard Inlet. The City also oversaw the construction of the John Braithwaite Community Center, located in the 100 block of 1st Street.

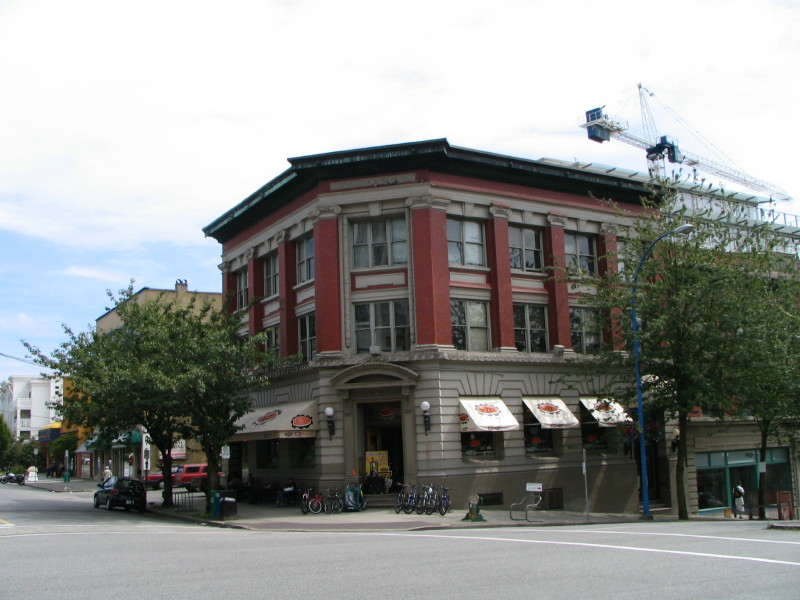
Lower Lonsdale 1

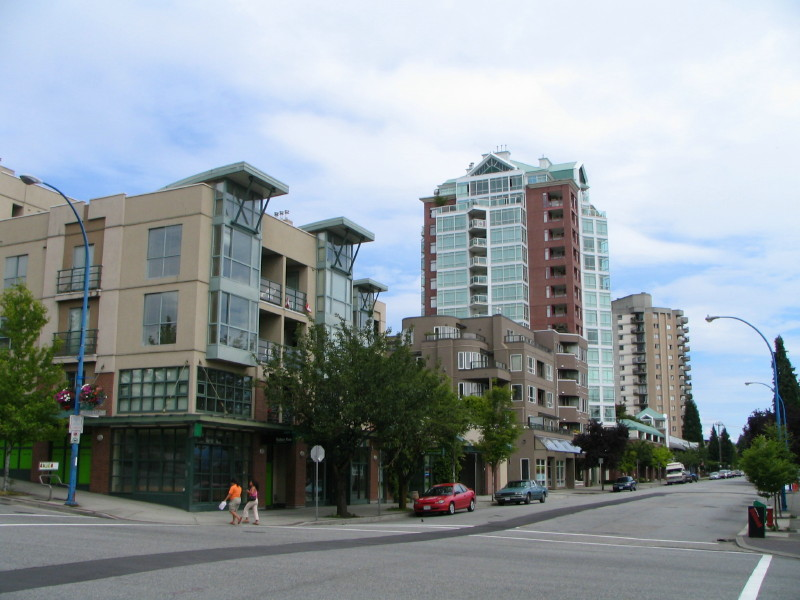
Lower Lonsdale 2

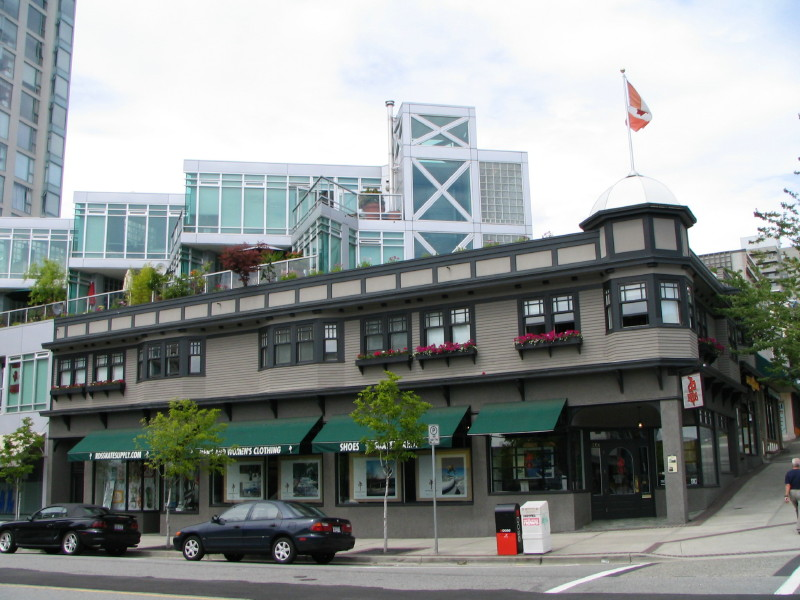
Lower Lonsdale 3

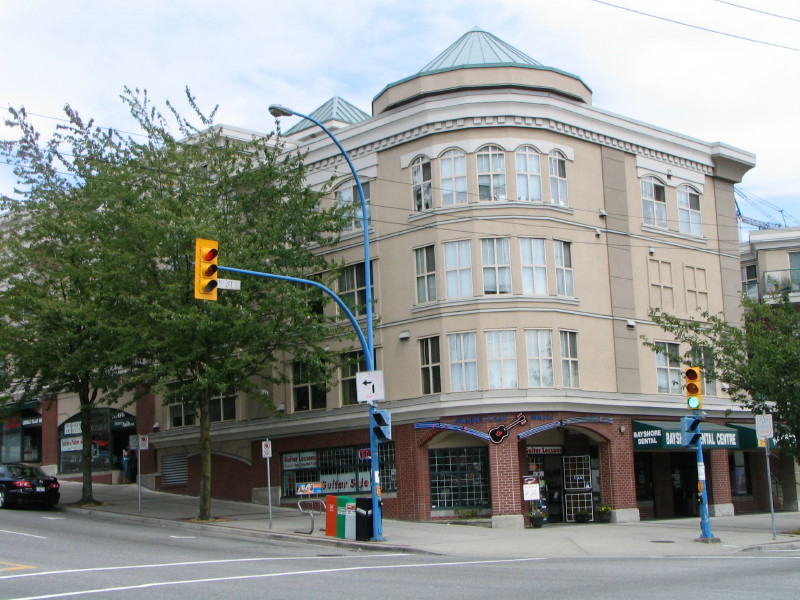
Lower Lonsdale 4
