= Woodlands, North Vancouver =

Part of the District of North Vancouver in British Columbia, Canada

Coordinates: 49°20′35″N 122°55′16″W

Woodlands is a part of the District of North Vancouver in British Columbia, Canada. It was first settled after the Second Boer War. The community is located at the foot of Mount Seymour on Indian Arm, itself a branch of Burrard Inlet, which forms Vancouver's harbour. It is about 14 kilometres (8.7 mi) from Downtown Vancouver.

== Education ==
Woodlands is served by four community schools in nearby Deep Cove, Cove Cliff Elementary, Dorothy Lynas Elementary, Sherwood Park Elementary, and Seycove Secondary School. Students participating in French immersion programs attend Dorothy Lynas Elementary School and Windsor Secondary School.

== See also ==
- List of communities in British Columbia
