= Delbrook Senior Secondary School =

Delbrook Senior Secondary, दालब्रूक स्कूल, ڈیلبروک سکول

Location
- 600 West Queens Road; North Vancouver, British Columbia; Canada; 49°20′14″N 123°5′11″W

Information
- School type: Public, high school
- Founded: 1957-1977
- School board: School District 44 North Vancouver
- Grades: 8-12
- Colours: light blue, dark blue
- Team name: Hilltoppers
- Feeder schools: Balmoral Junior Secondary; Highlands Elementary; Carisbrooke Elementary; Braemar Elementary

Delbrook Senior Secondary was a public high school from 1957 to 1977 in the District of North Vancouver, British Columbia, Canada, part of School District 44 North Vancouver.

== History ==
Delbrook opened in 1957 as only the second secondary school in North Vancouver (District or City), joining North Vancouver High School which itself opened in 1910. Delbrook was named for the area and avenue north of Westview in the city and district, east of Mosquito Creek and west of Lonsdale. Approximately 100 students from the graduating class of 1958 were moved from North Vancouver Secondary to form the first graduating class.

=== Catchment area ===
Its catchment area was bounded in this manner: from the North Shore mountains directly south along Lonsdale Avenue to 29th Street, then east to St. George's Road. Then south to Highway #1, then west to Mosquito Creek, again south to the top of the hill on Edgemont Blvd. north of 21st Street where it ran west again above 21st Street, to turn north again back to Highway #1 to include all houses on the west and east sides of Edgemont south of the highway. The area was then bounded by a line going west along Highway #1 to MacKay Creek, where it turned north along the creek to a western-line north of all property along Woods Drive to the Capilano River. Then north along the river, turned east north of Capilano Crescent and again along the middle of Ridgewood Drive to MacKay Creek, where it turned north along the creek to Emsley Creek, where it connected with the corner of Sunnycrest Drive and Highlands Blvd. It continued east between Wentworth Avenue on the south and Sunnycrest on the north to Mosquito Creek, where it finally followed the creek north back into the North Shore mountains.

The catchment area boundaries in the north Lonsdale area changed with time. According to Rosemary Redfield (née Gagne) during the 1964–65 school year the catchment area extended at least as far east as St. Mary's Street.

=== Fire and closure ===
Citing district-wide declining enrolment throughout the 1970s, the North Vancouver School Board planned to phase out Delbrook by June 1979. However, on January 28, 1977, a fire started in the lower section of the school doing $2M damage. Students completed the 1977 year at nearby Balmoral Junior Secondary, but retained their separate school identity and classes by going in shifts. In June Delbrook as an institution was formally closed two years earlier than proposed.

A University of British Columbia master's thesis studied Delbrook's sudden closing on the effects it had on grade 11 and 12 students being forced to transfer late in their high school careers. It found minimal impact on those transferring, except for some difficulty integrating into the established student body.

The remaining buildings, including the gymnasium and cafeteria (which both survived the fire) now operate under North Vancouver Parks and Recreation as the Delbrook Community Recreation Centre.

In 2009 Balmoral Junior Secondary became part of the Carson Graham Secondary School as its Balmoral campus. In 2012, Balmoral Junior Secondary closed and was replaced with Mountainside Secondary School, an alternative school and base for North Vancouver Online Learning.

== Academics and grade levels ==
Delbrook offered courses in a variety of subjects, including the humanities, sciences, language arts, linguistics, the arts, and early computer technology.

With the opening of Balmoral Junior Secondary in 1959, Delbrook focussed on grades 10, 11 and 12. In 1969, the grade 10 class was split between the two schools. Beginning 1971, Delbrook offered grades 8 to 12.

== Musical theatre ==
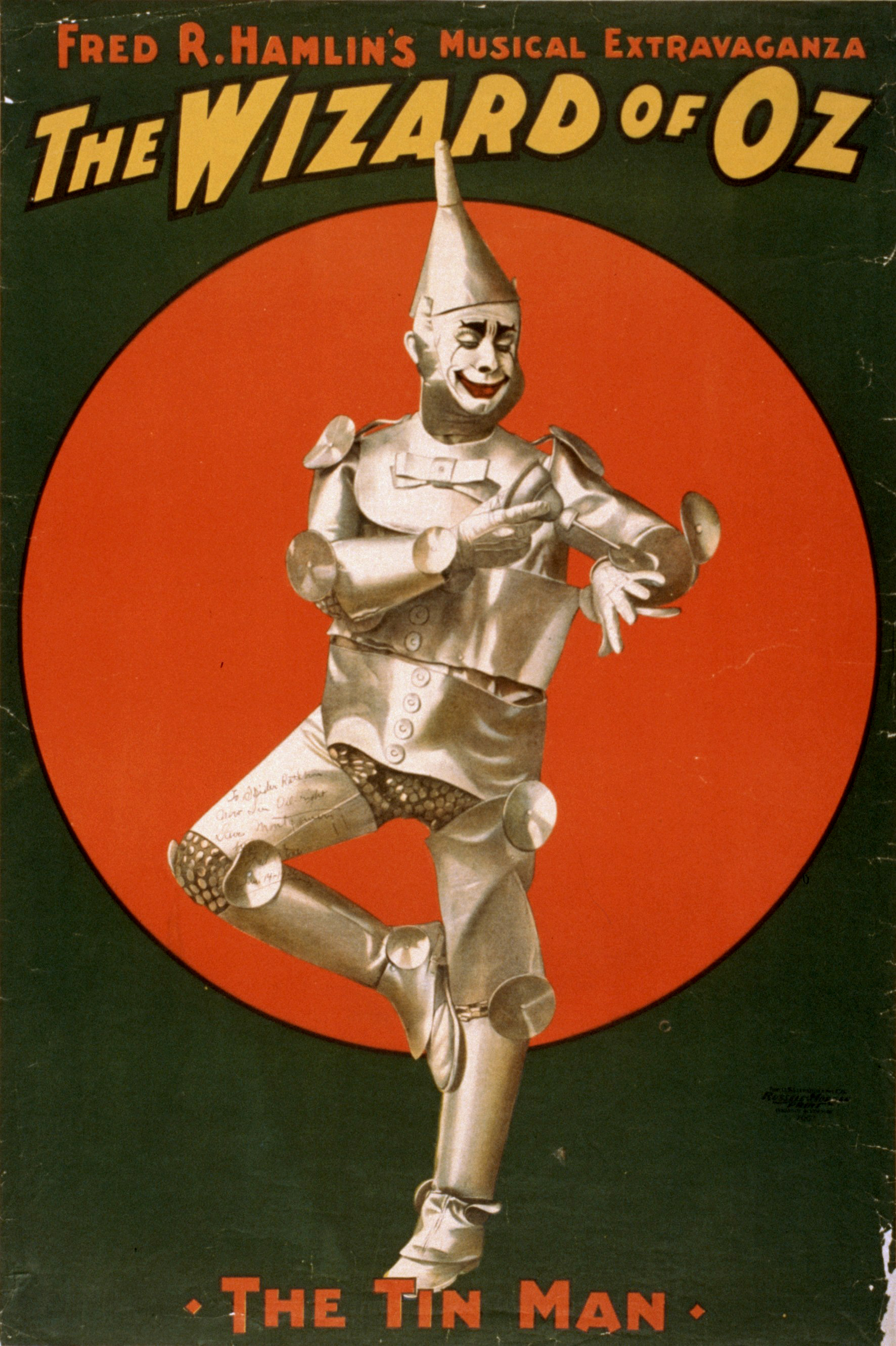
Poster for Fred R. Hamlin's 1902 musical extravaganza, the first major theatrical adaptation of The Wizard of Oz.

Delbrook was known for large production musicals. Mr. Norm Ashcroft, Vice-Principal (1969–1975), was instrumental in reviving musicals at Delbrook. The following is a list of musicals put on at Delbrook:

- A Christmas Carol in 1961
- Oklahoma! in 1965
- Oliver! in 1971
- The Wizard of Oz in 1972
- South Pacific in 1973.
- Annie Get Your Gun! in 1974

The Wizard of Oz was taken from a 1945 stage play using songs from the 1939 film; adapted by Frank Gabrielson for the St. Louis Municipal Opera.

== Hey Nostradamus! ==
Douglas Coupland's 2003 novel Hey Nostradamus! begins at a fictional Delbrook Senior Secondary in 1988 with a Columbine-like massacre at the school, the original having taken place in April 1999 in Jefferson County, Colorado.

== Notable alumni and staff ==
- Ab Bryant - bassist for Chilliwack, the rock band
- Sandra Hartley Cousins - née Hartley, 1968 Olympian (gymnastics), Western Canadian Champion
- Peter Jepson-Young 1957–1992, Doctor, early AIDS activist and film documentary personality, known the CBC Dr. Peter Diaries Documentary aka The Broadcast Tapes of Dr. Peter. Class of 1975.
- Greg F. Lee - President and Vice-Chancellor, Capilano University, North Vancouver
- Karen Magnussen - world figure skating champion 1973, winner of 3 Gold medals who later graduated from Carson Graham School
- Joe Mattias - Chief, Squamish First Nation
- Jim Miller - Wrestler, Canadian Juvenile Champion 1969, Pan Am Games medalist 1975, Olympic coach 1988, 1992
- Mike Miller - Pan American Junior Championships Gold Medalist 1973
- Linda Moore - née Tweedie, former Canadian and World curling champion (1985), colour commentator for TSN sports television.
- Bill Parnell - physical education teacher and head football coach, BC Sports Hall of Fame inductee, winner of the Mile race 1950 British Empire Games, Olympic 1500 meters finalist 1948 & 1952.
- Kris Pechet - coach of Seaquam Secondary School football team, 2006 BC AA High School Champions
- Ida Random - née Cunningham, nominated for 1988 Academy Award, Best Art Direction-Set Decoration, Rain Man
- Bob Random - né Chambers, character actor in movies and television c. 1955-1990
- Margaret Trudeau - née Sinclair, former spouse of 15th Canadian Prime Minister Pierre Elliott Trudeau and mother of 23rd Canadian Prime Minister Justin Trudeau

== Athletics ==
The school had teams in football, rugby union, gymnastics, baseball, wrestling, volleyball, field hockey, basketball, swimming, tennis and golf.

The Senior Boys football team captured the Shrine Bowl Provincial Championship in 1969, beating Maple Ridge Secondary 13–9 at Empire Stadium. The team was coached by former Canadian Olympian Bill Parnell. Murray Wimbles won outstanding lineman and Martin Smith won outstanding back for the game. The team also competed annually with North Vancouver High School for "The Helmet" in football and "The Shoe" in basketball as well as with neighbouring Carson Graham High School in football for "the Cage".

The Senior Girls basketball team finished second in the British Columbia tournament in 1962. The Senior Boys basketball team won four consecutive league championships with their best season being 1966-67 when they had a 26-7 won-lost record.

The Senior Tennis team won the 1968 BC provincial championships led by singles winners Michelle Carey and David Johnston.

The Senior Wrestling Team was undefeated in dual meets during the 68/69 school year, and placed 3rd at the BC High School Wrestling Championships with Jim Miller (Gold), Rob Butler (Silver), and Pat Henman (Bronze) leading the way. Jim Miller won multiple national championships and represented Canada at Olympic & Pan American competitions. Jim Miller attended and graduated from Brown University and was inducted into their Athletic Hall of Fame. Both Jim Miller and Pat Henman competed at Simon Fraser University while on athletic scholarships. Pat Henman went on to coach wrestling in Abbotsford and lead Abbotsford Senior Secondary to numerous Fraser Valley Championships (1981–1985) and the Fraser Valley Zone to two Gold Medal performances at the BC Winter Games, and was named Outstanding High School Wrestling Coach in 1983. Jim Miller was Canadian National Team Coach for Wrestling ('80-'96) during which time the national team realized the most success in its history. He was also Head Coach for Canadian Snowboarding ('08).

On January 8, 1970, a four-year, major renovation of the school gymnasium was completed by Thompson, Berwick, Pratt and Partners.

== See also ==
- Balmoral Junior Secondary - later Carson Graham Secondary, Balmoral Campus (2009 - 2012) and re-purposed to become Mountainside Secondary School in 2013
- The Hilltoppers - a 1950s vocal group, shared a name with Delbrook's sports teams
