= Canyon Heights Elementary School =

Location
- 4501 Highland Boulevard; North Vancouver, British Columbia, V7R 3A2; Canada

Information
- School type: Elementary school
- School board: School District 44 North Vancouver
- Superintendent: Mike Pearmain
- Area trustee: Cyndi Gerlach
- Principal: Kevin Ward
- Grades: K-7
- Enrollment: 365+
- Language: English, Canadian French
- Website: www.nvsd44.bc.ca/schoolsites/canyonheights.aspx

Canyon Heights Elementary School is a school located in the district municipality of North Vancouver, British Columbia, Canada. The school has approximately 365 students from kindergarten to grade 7. The school offers various sports for the senior grades such as basketball and volleyball as well as track and field for intermediate grades (4 to 7). There is also a band and strings program. After graduation, students move on to Handsworth Secondary School.
