= Blueridge Elementary School =

School in British Columbia, Canada

Location
- 2650 Bronte Drive; North Vancouver, British Columbia, V7H 1M4; Canada
- Coordinates: 49.324364°N 123.001678°W

Information
- School type: Elementary school
- School board: School District 44 North Vancouver
- Principal: Kathy Kee
- Grades: K-7
- Enrollment: 363
- Language: English
- Website: nvsd44.bc.ca

Blueridge Elementary School is a school located in the district municipality of North Vancouver, British Columbia, Canada. The school has 360 students and offers classes in Kindergarten to grade 7. The school offers sports for the senior grades such as basketball and volleyball. Some activities in Blueridge are choir, band, and track and field in intermediate grade (grade 4–7).

Blueridge is a single-story building with a gravel field and play structures for the students. Adjacent to Blueridge is a district-owned forest and tennis courts. The students are allowed to use the courts and the forest at recess and lunch.

After graduation from Blueridge Elementary School, students move on to Windsor Secondary School.
