= Howard Graham =

Howard Graham may refer to:

- Howard Graham (Canadian Army officer) (1898–1986), Canadian Army officer and Chief of the General Staff
- Howard Carson Graham (1889–1959), Canadian medical doctor
