= Deep Cove, North Vancouver =

Human settlement in British Columbia, Canada

Coordinates: 49.32691°N 122.94868°W

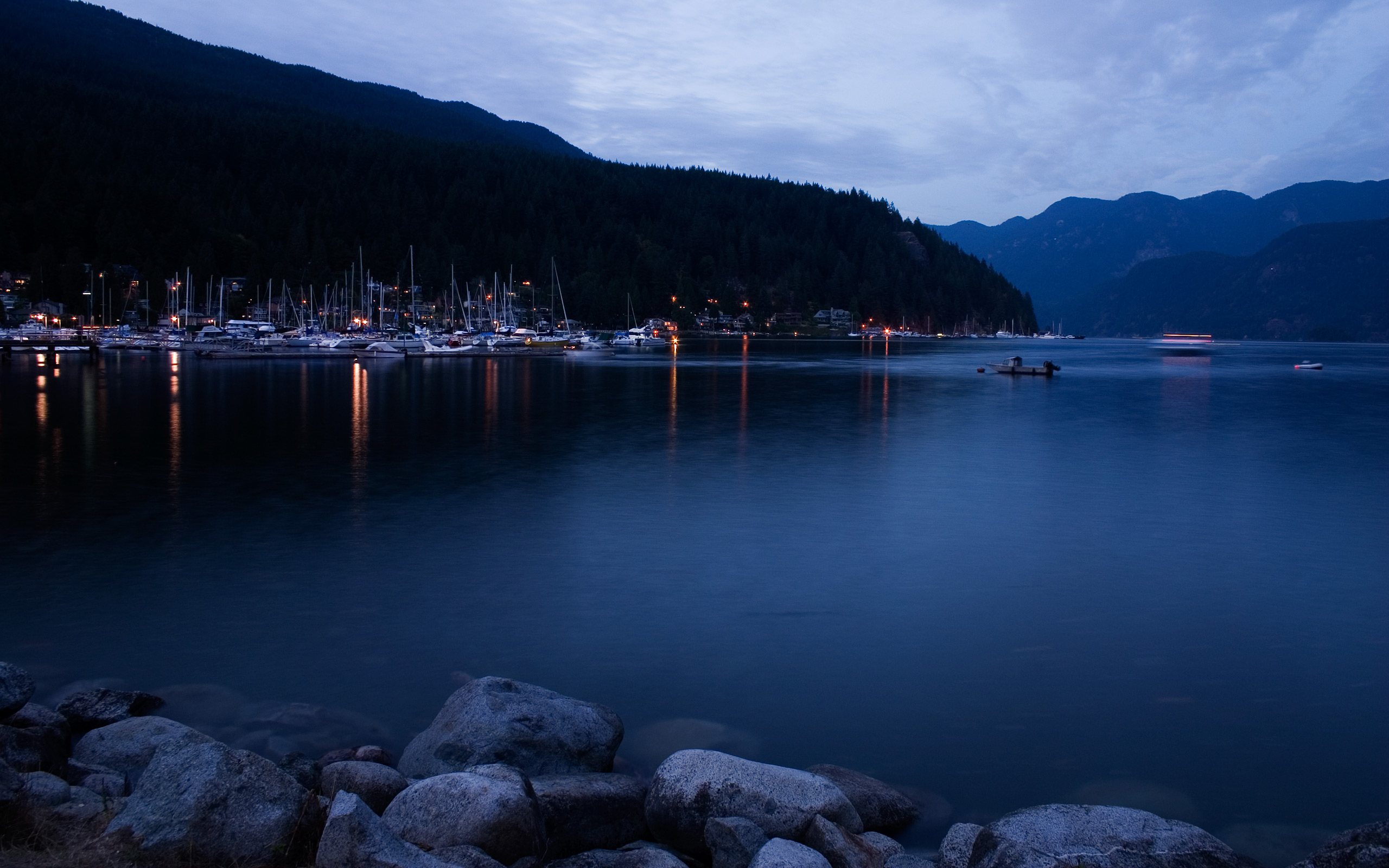
Deep Cove at dusk, looking northeast. The marina is to the left.

Deep Cove refers to the community in the easternmost part of the District of North Vancouver, in British Columbia, Canada, and is also the geographic name of the small bay beside the town. It is affectionately referred to as "The Cove" by local residents. Located at the foot of Mount Seymour, Deep Cove faces due east, fronting onto Indian Arm, a branch of the Burrard Inlet. The area is the traditional territory of the Tsleil-Waututh and Squamish Nations. Deep Cove is 13 kilometres (8.1 mi) from downtown Vancouver.

== History ==
Deep Cove, or Deepwater as it was first known, is a traditional clamming and fishing area of the Tsleil-Waututh nation who lived in the area. British and Spanish naval explorers scouted Indian Arm in the late eighteenth century, and by the mid-nineteenth century, whales were being caught and flensed on the Cove's shores.

Deep Cove became a popular summer resort for Vancouver residents in the 1910s, with cabins, logging, and granite quarrying featured in the local history. For many years, the focal point of the community included a yacht club, dance hall, and general store.

The population slowly grew in the 1960s and 1970s, when access to the area improved following the completion of the Second Narrows Bridge to Vancouver in 1960. However, Deep Cove held on to its rural feel, and a large, open horse paddock sat adjacent to Gallant Avenue in this period. Today, the Cove remains a popular attraction in the district, drawing visitors from neighbouring Cove Cliff, Dollarton, Parkgate, Indian Arm, and Woodlands areas.

== Recreation ==
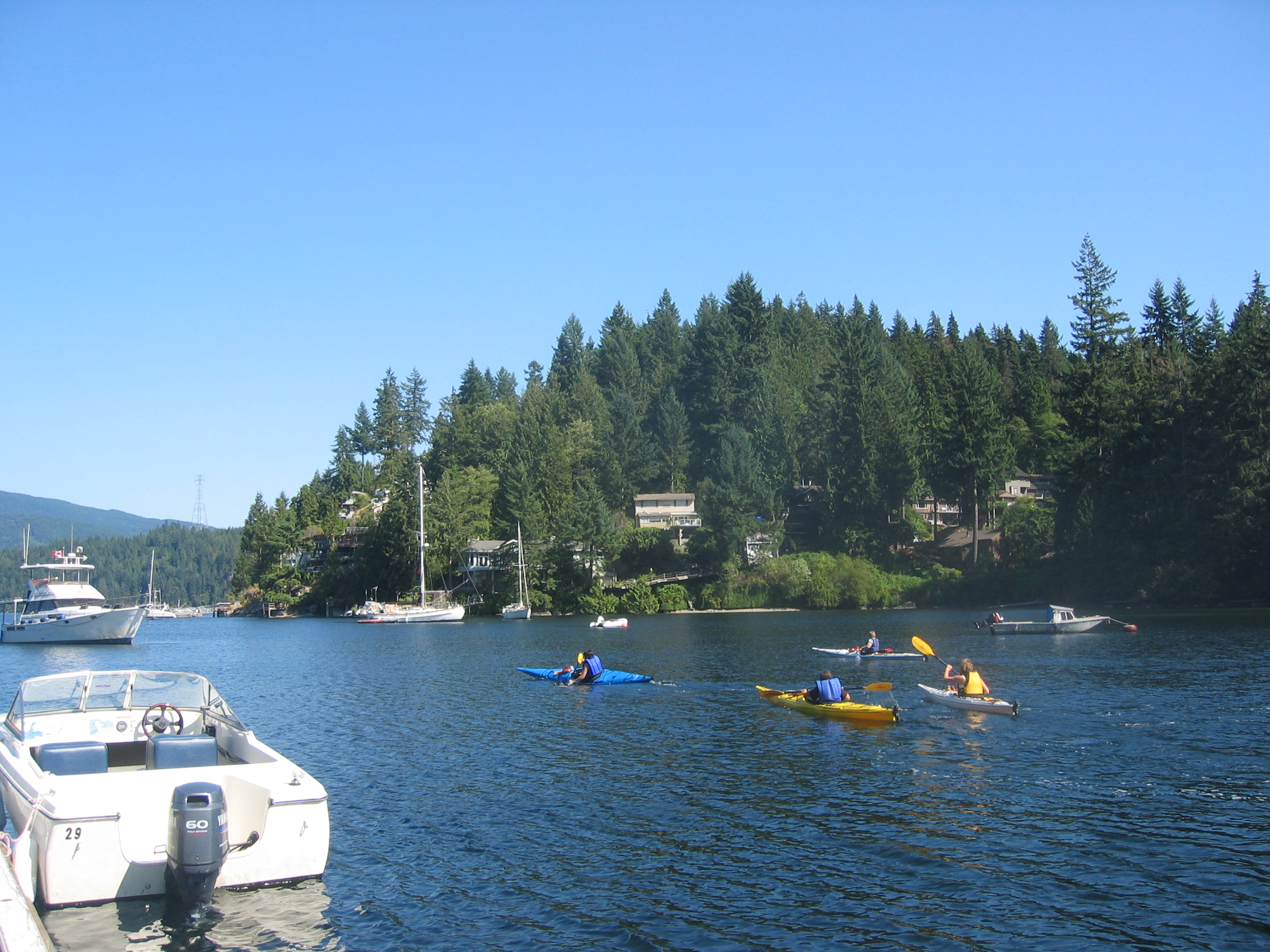
Deep Cove offers kayaking activities from the marina, among other sports.

With its proximity to forests, mountains, skiing, hiking, parks, and the water, Deep Cove is well known among outdoor recreation enthusiasts. The Deep Cove Bike Shop, a local institution, brought the first mountain bikes to Vancouver in the early 1980s.

Deep Cove is a popular small boat centre, with a Rowing Club, kayak rentals and lessons, and a marina. The bay in front of the community is one of the few in Indian Arm which has both a sheltering shape and the shallow bottom required for overnight anchorage of pleasure vessels.

The Baden-Powell Trail leading up to the lookout point, Quarry Rock, is a popular spot for visitors, especially in the summer.

The Cultural Centre houses the First Impressions Theatre Company and Deep Cove Stage Society in the 130-seat air-conditioned Shaw Theatre, the Seymour Art Gallery, and the Deep Cove Heritage Society.

== Education ==
Deep Cove is served by three community schools, Cove Cliff Elementary, Seycove Secondary and Sherwood Park Elementary School, as well as two other schools in the surrounding area. Students participating in the French immersion program attend Argyle Secondary School, Windsor Secondary School, Sherwood Park Elementary School, or Dorothy Lynas Elementary School. A number of childhood learning and care facilities serve the residents as well. As the teaching philosophies and practices differ, the common banner term of "Preschool" or "Pre-K" is appropriate.

== Notable residents ==
- Canadian artist Charles van Sandwyk spent his teen years in Deep Cove.
- Canadian nature artist Annora Brown lived and painted in Deep Cove during her retirement years, dying there in 1987.
- The actor Ben Affleck had a residence in Deep Cove in the early 2000s.
- The writer Malcolm Lowry lived as a squatter in nearby Dollarton in the 1940s; his cabin is gone but remembered with a plaque in Cates Park.
- Darren Schemmer, the Canadian High Commissioner to Ghana, is also from Deep Cove.
- The occultist Charles Stansfeld Jones and his family lived for many years in Deep Cove.
- Actor Sebastian Cabot spent his final years in Deep Cove prior to his death in 1977
