= Annora Brown =

Canadian artist (1899–1987)

- Undated photograph of Annora Brown
- Born: Mary Annora Brown; 1899; Red Deer, Alberta
- Died: 1987 (aged 87–88); Deep Cove, British Columbia
- Education: Ontario College of Art (1925-1929)
- Notable work: Prairie Chicken Dance, 1955, Alberta Jubilee Collection

Mary Annora Brown L.L. D. (1899–1987), known as Annora Brown, was a Canadian visual artist whose work encompassed painting and graphic design. She was best known for her depictions of natural landscapes, wildflowers, and First Nations communities in Canada. Much of her work thematically explored Albertan identity, though she remained relatively obscure in discussions of Canadian art.

== Life ==
Mary Annora Brown was born near Red Deer, Alberta, Canada, the daughter of Edmund Forster Brown of the North-West Mounted Police and Elizabeth Ethel Cody. Forster Brown had ridden with Sam Steele and Kootenay Brown, while Cody, who was related to Buffalo Bill Cody, had traveled west from Ontario and was a schoolteacher.

Annora Brown grew up in Fort Macleod, Alberta. Her introduction to art came from her mother, who had in turn been taught to paint by Florence Carlyle. Brown went on to study at the Ontario College of Art from 1925-1929. Two of her instructors were notable Group of Seven members Arthur Lismer and J. E. H. MacDonald. These artists were interested in developing a modernist strand of Canadian art that could contribute to the construction of a Canadian identity, but she was encouraged to develop her own style. At the OCA she met and became friends with other notable western artists, which included Euphemia McNaught and Illingworth Kerr.

Brown then taught at Mount Royal College in Calgary, Alberta from 1929 to 1931. Upon her return to Fort Macleod in 1931, she completed work for the University of Alberta Faculty of Extension on handicrafts. She continued producing artwork in her studio, while also working as an illustrator and designer, caring for her parents, and engaging in amateur naturalism. She became committed to the introduction of art schools in the region and was one of several artists committed to expanding Albertan art education in the 1930s and 1940s. From 1945-1950 she taught at the Banff School of Fine Arts. She displayed with and became a member of various artistic organisations throughout her career, and she was the first female member of the Alberta Society of Artists.

In 1965, Brown moved to British Columbia, initially to Sidney, and then to Deep Cove, where she continued to make art. In 1971, she was awarded an honorary doctorate from the University of Lethbridge. Brown died in Deep Cove in 1987.

== Publications ==
During the 1930s Brown began to gather information relating to the history and lore of southern Alberta wildflowers, which would later become her first major publication: Old Man's Garden. It was published in 1954 by J.M. Dent & Sons, the publisher for whom she had previously completed book illustrations for. The book integrates practical knowledge and lore from southern Alberta First Nations communities the Piikani and Kainai nations, with scientific and historical information derived from the accounts of European botanical explorers. In particular, Old Man's Garden describes the spiritual creator of the prairies in Blackfoot culture, named Napi. Brown also completed scratchboard illustrations for the book. It was republished in 1970 by Evergreen Press.

After she retired to Deep Cove, Brown began work on her autobiography, which was published as Sketches from Life, in 1981. The book features an introduction by Frank Lynch-Staunton, the 11th Lieutenant Governor of Alberta, who was a family friend of Brown's.

== Art ==
Evening Star, by Annora Brown

Brown was a versatile artist and worked in various mediums, including oil painting, watercolour, graphic design and print making. She was best known for her paintings of natural landscapes, wildflowers and Canadian First Nations communities, focusing her work on western Canadian imagery and themes.

Brown's work, which depicted objects and landscapes that were considered mundane at the time (such as grain elevators and prairie landscapes), was viewed as radical by patrons of the local art market. She was one of the first artists to depict regional subject matter in an attempt to define Albertan identity. She rejected the conservatism of early 20th century Albertan art, instead taking influence from local communities, native plants and the regional landscape. Her work and philosophies contributed to the exploration and formation of local identity, the themes of which are still relevant to provincial identity today. Though well-known in the Fort Macleod region, she has become obscure in wider discussions of the history of Canadian art.

Brown had an extensive knowledge of Albertan plant life and cultivated wildflowers in her garden in Fort Macleod. During the Great Depression she began to paint small "portraits" of flowers which she sold for $1. She was later hired, in 1958, by the Glenbow Foundation to create 200 paintings of Alberta wildflowers. In order to find specimens to paint, Brown travelled to various natural areas in the province such as Waterton Lakes National Park and Banff National Park. She completed the commission in 1960. Some of the flowers she painted are now extinct, and the paintings, done in watercolour and casein, are now housed in the Glenbow art collection.

Brown displays modernist tendencies in her use of bold colours, and takes influence from her instructor Lawren Harris in portraying natural spaces using abstract and geometric shapes. Her works have a decorative character, which reflects her experience in design, embroidery, and production of batik textile arts.

== Bibliography ==
=== As author ===
- Brown, Annora (3 September 1941). "Prairie totems". Canadian Geographical Journal 23: 148–51.
- Brown, Annora (1974). Flowers from Alberta. Calgary, Alberta: Glenbow-Alberta Institute.
- Brown, Annora (1981). Sketches from Life. Edmonton, Alberta: Hurtig.
- Brown, Annora (1954). Old Man's Garden. Toronto, Ontario: J.M. Dent & Sons.

=== As illustrator (selected) ===
- Olive, M., and Clara Tyner (1962). Totem, Tipi and Tumpline: Stories of Canadian Indians. Toronto, Ontario and Vancouver, British Columbia: J. M. Dent.
- Stephen, Pamela (1955). Winged Canoes at Nootka. Toronto, Ontario and Vancouver, British Columbia: J. M. Dent.
- Dickie, Donalda, Belle Ricker, Clara Tyner, T. W. Woodhead and Helen Plank, compilers (1954). Proud Procession: Canadian Parade Readers. Toronto, Ontario and Vancouver, British Columbia: J. M. Dent and Sons.
- McKeever, Harry P. (1974). Canaries on the Clothesline. Sidney, British Columbia: Gray's Publishing Ltd.
