= Sutherland Secondary School =

Location
- 1860 Sutherland Avenue; North Vancouver, British Columbia, V7L 4C2; Canada
- Coordinates: 49.32614°N 123.05282°W

Information
- School type: Public, high school
- Motto: Consectatio Praestantiae (Striving for Excellence)
- School board: School District 44 North Vancouver
- Superintendent: Pius Ryan
- School number: 4444012
- Principal: Mark Barrett
- Staff: 105
- Grades: 8–12
- Enrollment: 1,053 (October 31, 2010)
- Language: English
- Colours: Blue, Red, White
- Mascot: Sabre
- Team name: Sutherland Sabres
- Website: www.sd44.ca/school/sutherland
- Last updated: January 27, 2025

Sutherland Secondary School is a public high school in the city of North Vancouver, British Columbia and part of School District 44 North Vancouver.

Sutherland Secondary School was at one time a junior high school. At the time, many students then went on to Carson Graham Secondary or Argyle Secondary. Throughout the years, Sutherland's greatest sporting rival has been Handsworth Secondary.

Sutherland had been rebuilt in its present location on a gravel field, as it was the second oldest school in the district. The new school was finished in the fall of 2007, followed by the completion of a new artificial field in the spring of 2008.

It was the filming location of all the high school scenes in the CW show Life Unexpected. in the fall of 2009. In the 1980s, several episodes of the TV show 21 Jump Street were also filmed at the school. In 2018 the Disney Chanel movie Freaky Friday was filmed throughout the school. Over the summer of 2019 the Netflix series The Healing Powers of Dude used the school's interior and exterior for filming.

== Notable alumni ==
- Bryan Adams, singer
- Rob Boyce - Former gymnast, and professional Skateboarder and snowboarder known as Sluggo
- Shane Bunting (a.k.a. Madchild), Canadian rapper from group Swollen Members
- Jim Easton Jr., former professional soccer player
- Harry Jerome, Track
- Valerie Jerome, Track
- Carol Montgomery, Olympic Triathlon 2000, 2004
