= Balmoral Junior Secondary School =

Carson Graham Secondary, Balmoral Campus
- formerly Balmoral Junior Secondary School

Location
- 3365 Mahon Avenue; North Vancouver, British Columbia, V7N 3T7; Canada; 49.3403°N 123.0803°W

Information
- School type: Public, high school
- Founded: 1959
- Closed: 2012
- School board: School District 44 North Vancouver
- Superintendent: John Lewis
- Principal: Stephen Garland
- Grades: 8-10
- Enrollment: Around 700 (2010)
- Colours: Orange and Black
- Team name: Barons
- Feeder schools: Highlands Elementary; North Star Elementary; Carisbrooke Elementary; Braemar Elementary; Larson Elementary
- Website: www.sd44.ca/school/mountainside/Pages/default.aspx

Balmoral Junior Secondary School was a public high school in North Vancouver, British Columbia, Canada, part of School District 44 North Vancouver. Since the French immersion program left Balmoral Junior Secondary in 2003, that institution saw declining enrollment, to the point where the school closed in 2009. The property has since been repurposed to hold the grade 8 and 9 classes of Carson Graham Secondary while that school undergoes a facilities upgrade. The Balmoral building, redesignated as the Carson Graham Secondary Balmoral Campus, was phased out in 2012 following the completion of the work at Carson Graham. In 2013 it became Mountainside Secondary School, an alternative school for students between grades 9 and 12.

== History ==
Balmoral Junior Secondary School opened in about 1959 to serve Grades 7, 8 and 9 students in the northwest area of the District of North Vancouver. It was intended as a feeder to Delbrook Senior Secondary a few blocks away. In 1969 Balmoral split the grade 10 class with Delbrook.

In January 1977 the Delbrook building was destroyed by fire, necessitating Balmoral accommodating both schools' students and staff until the end of June. Following this, Balmoral became a feeder school to Carson Graham Secondary School.

In 2009, Balmoral ceased to exist as a separate school and became the second campus to Carson Graham Secondary School.

The Balmoral site closed in 2012 and in 2013 the school was replaced with Mountainside Secondary School, with an alternative education program.

== Honour Roll ==
- 1960 Susan Chapman / Peter Greg
- 1961 Rod Holloway
- 1962 Fred Chapman
- 1963 Cherry Pye / Bill Chapman
- 1964 Christine Brewer
- 1965 Kathy Brown / John Weymark
- 1966 Ken Anderson / Bill MacLeod
- 1967 Scott Diffley / Leanne Excell
- 1968 Janet Clarke
- 1969 Ted Hutchinson
- 1971 Stuart Thistlewaite
- 1974 Clint Fox
- 1975 Lisa Peters
- 1976 Kelly Grant
- 1977 Wendy Earl
- 1978 Cameron Bruce
- 1979 Mary Graves
- 1980 Linda MacGregor (Also Awarded Top Athlete)
- 1981 Liam Kearns
- 1982 Tami Redekop
- 1983 Jenny Lo
- 1984 Elizabeth Pagdin
- 1985 Katie Fairley / Kevin White
- 1986 Debbie Lisle
- 1987 Andrea Wiebe
- 1988 Rochelle Stariha
- 1989 Navida Shivji
- 1990 Sophie Yendole
- 1991 Bruce Sled
- 1992 Angus Fergusson
- 1993 Natalya Nicholson
- 1994 Laura Campbell
- 1995 Rebecca Webster
- 1996 Roxanne Chow
- 1997 Christopher Armstrong
- 1998 Kitt Turney
- 1999 Barbora Farkas
- 2000 Michelle Arduini
- 2001 Katie MacKay
- 2002 Ornella Sabti
- 2003 Vanessa Janzen
- 2004 Elizabeth Kennedy / Brooke MacGillivary
- 2005 Peter Christiansen
- 2006 Kikuko Araki

== Athletics ==
From its opening, Balmoral was known for its superior rugby program. Under Coach Bob Payne in the 1960s the bantam and juvenile teams often went undefeated in a season, and were unscored upon in a few. The grade 8 and grade 9 rugby were perennial Vancouver and District champions. In 1969 the school fielded a grade 10 boys' team for the first time. The school has produced numerous Canada U-19 and U-21 players and, at last count, three full international senior players; Tony Scott (1973), Ron Johnstone (2001–present), and Kelly McCallum (2003).

In 1997 they became only the third junior high school in the 33-year history of the B.C. High School Wrestling Championships to finish fourth.

In 2007 Balmoral beat Seycove in Boys Soccer for their league junior championship. They were the runners-up for the Vancouver and District title.

== Closure ==
In the 2006–2007 school year the North Vancouver School District put Balmoral on a list of schools slated for closure due to declining enrollment. The school parent advisory committee started a campaign to find more funding and keep the school open.

The PAC's presentations presented a strategy to keep the school open, called the International Baccalaureate Program, which was approved in 2007.

In 2009, the school district twinned an immediate rebuild of Carson Graham School with the closure of Balmoral in 2012. At issue was either the construction of a seismically sound, single facility at the Carson Graham site for 1,100 students, or the maintenance of two sites, both with aging facilities and one with under 300 students.

== Drama and musical theatre program ==
Balmoral's Drama Program rivalled many others on the North Shore, second only to Sentinel Secondary School. It was headed up by Ms. Aurora Reale with the some assistance from Tim Cadney. The program put on around 5–7 different shows each year, including spring and fall festivals.

=== Productions ===
Drama

- Originality 2004
- Village Of Idiots 2006
- Grounded 2006 (also performed at the North Vancouver Drama Festival)

Musical theatre

- The Boyfriend 1993
- Little Shop of Horrors 1994
- Godspell 1995
- Bye Bye Birdie 1996
- Cats 1996
- Joseph and the Amazing Technicolor Dreamcoat 1997
- Leader of the Pack 1997
- Pippin 1997
- Annie 2004
- Grease 2004
- Cats 2005
- Once On This Island 2006
- Footloose 2006
- Grease 2007
- Franklin Falls (Written By Courtenay Ennis and Directed By Tim Cadney) 2007
- Chicago 2008
- Little Shop Of Horrors 2008
- Shevil 2009

Most of these musicals were directed by Tim Cadney or Richard Berg. The Musical Direction was done by either Chris King or Courtenay Ennis.

== Arms ==
Coat of arms of Balmoral Junior Secondary School
Notes Granted 15 June 2006. Crest Issuant from a mural coronet Azure masoned Or an open book Argent bound and charged on each page with a pallet wavy Azure. Escutcheon Or a knight’s helmet affronty Argent embellished Or plumed Sable on a chief dancetty Azure three rings interlaced Or. Motto Mens Corpus Animus

== See also ==
- Carson Graham Secondary School
- Delbrook Senior Secondary School
- Mountainside Secondary School
