= Euphemia McNaught =

Canadian impressionist painter

- Born: October 8, 1901; Glen Morris, Ontario, Canada
- Died: May 24, 2002 (aged 100); Beaverlodge, Alberta, Canada
- Education: Ontario College of Art
- Notable work: "Mile 27 of the Alaska Highway"
- Style: Impressionist landscapes Watercolour
- Website: mcnaught-homestead-heritage.com

Euphemia "Betty" McNaught (October 8, 1901 – May 24, 2002) was a Canadian impressionist painter who focused primarily on landscapes and pioneer lifestyles in Alberta.

In 1942, McNaught was commissioned by Canadian Prime Minister William Lyon Mackenzie King to document the construction of the Alaska Highway.

She was the founding member of the Grande Prairie Art Club and the Beaverlodge Art Club. McNaught was born in Glen Morris, Ontario, in 1901, and died at the age of 100 in Beaverlodge, Alberta.

== Biography ==
Born in Glen Morris, Ontario in 1901 to Charles McNaught and Eliza Conner, Euphemia McNaught moved from Glen Morris, Ontario, to Beaverlodge, Alberta at the age of 10. After graduating from the local school, she taught there for two years. Afterwards, she enrolled in the Ontario College of Art and Design, and studied under Group of Seven members Arthur Lismer and James Edward MacDonald. While in the college, McNaught met fellow artist, Annora Brown.

She graduated the college in 1929 and moved to Calgary to pursue teaching at the Mount Royal College. In 1931, after two years of teaching in Calgary, she moved to Whitby, Ontario, to teach at the Ontario Ladies' College. After a brief absence due to her father's death and her job painting the Alaska Highway, she began teaching at the University of Alberta Department of Extension in Grand Prairie in 1955.

Along with the Alberta Society of Artists, McNaught's work was displayed at the 1931 Calgary Stampede and Exhibition. In 1973, McNaught joined the Peace Watercolour Society. In 1985, she was elected as a lifetime member of the Alberta Society of Artists. She died at the age of 100 in 2002.

After her death, McNaught's pieces were featured in the National Gallery of Canada.

== Awards ==
In 1977, McNaught was awarded the Alberta Achievement Award of Excellence in Art. She also was the first recipient of the Sir Frederick Haultain Prize in 1982.
