= Daniel Gawthrop (writer) =

Canadian writer and editor (born 1963)

- Born: 1963 (age 62–63); Nanaimo, British Columbia
- Occupations: Writer and editor
- Writing career
- Period: 1980s–present
- Notable works: Cutting Edge: Hockey as Queer Culture, The Rice Queen Diaries, The Trial of Pope Benedict, Double Karma
- Website: www.danielgawthrop.com

Daniel Gawthrop (born 1963 in Nanaimo, British Columbia) is a Canadian writer and editor. He is the author of seven books, including Cutting Edge: Hockey as Queer Culture. He is best known for The Trial of Pope Benedict and The Rice Queen Diaries, and also published a novel, Double Karma, in 2023. As a journalist, he was the original publisher and editor of Xtra! West in Vancouver, and has also contributed to publications including the Vancouver Sun, The Economist, The Georgia Straight, Quill & Quire, Canadian Forum, and The Tyee. From 2004 until 2024 he worked as a communications representative for the Canadian Union of Public Employees, and is an occasional contributor to British Columbia Review.

== Background ==
He was educated at the University of Victoria (BA 1987), the University of King's College (BJ 1988), and Royal Roads University (MA 2009). During the 1990s, he worked as a journalist for various publications in British Columbia. In 1990, he was part of a gay writers group in the Vancouver area, which included Stan Persky, George Stanley and Scott Watson, that launched the literary magazine Sodomite Invasion Review. He was named as the first publisher and editor of Xtra! West in 1993.

During the 1994 NHL playoffs he attracted national attention when articles he had published in both Xtra! West and the Vancouver Sun, about the sex appeal of Vancouver Canucks hockey player Pavel Bure, drew commentary on Hockey Night in Canada from Don Cherry.

He is an active member of the Writers' Union of Canada.

== Books ==
His first book, a biography of AIDS activist and educator Peter Jepson-Young titled Affirmation: The AIDS Odyssey of Dr. Peter (1994), examined its subject's life and contributions in the context of the conservative politics and mediascape of the times.

His second book, an examination of the New Democratic government of Mike Harcourt titled Highwire Act: Power, Pragmatism and the Harcourt Legacy, was published in 1996.

He followed up with Vanishing Halo: Saving the Boreal Forest in 1999, a book commissioned by the David Suzuki Foundation to raise awareness about the world's coniferous crown and the industrial practices that have threatened it.

After a few years in Thailand, where he worked as a sub-editor for the English language daily newspaper The Nation, he returned to Canada and in 2005 published The Rice Queen Diaries, a personal memoir that explores the political and cultural minefields of ethnicity and desire between white Western and Far East Asian men.

In 2013, he published The Trial of Pope Benedict: Joseph Ratzinger and the Vatican's Assault on Reason, Compassion, and Human Dignity, a critical account of its subject's decades-long campaign to crush a liberal reform movement within the Roman Catholic Church after the Second Vatican Council.

That same year, he took a leave of absence from CUPE to live and work in Yangon, Myanmar, where he began writing what would become his first novel. Double Karma is the story of a young American photographer who travels to his father's native land of Burma in 1988, becomes involved with a student leader in the pro-democracy uprising, then gets stuck inside the country after being mistaken for a dead soldier. The novel was published in 2023.

In 2026, he published Cutting Edge: Hockey as Queer Culture, which explores the evolution of Canada’s national sport from a bastion of straight white male machismo to a place where women, players of all ethnicities, gender identities and sexual orientations are increasingly visible and assuming their own place in the game. The book reveals how social change has led to more advocacy in making mainstream hockey a safer space that’s more welcoming to everyone—despite resistance from the game’s gatekeepers, including the National Hockey League, which had yet to produce an openly gay roster player.

=== Works ===
- Affirmation: The AIDS Odyssey of Dr. Peter (New Star Books, 1994) — ISBN 9780921586357
- Highwire Act: Power, Pragmatism and the Harcourt Legacy (New Star Books, 1996) — ISBN 9780921586487
- Vanishing Halo: Saving the Boreal Forest (Greystone Books/David Suzuki Foundation, 1999) — ISBN 9780898866810
- The Rice Queen Diaries (2005, Arsenal Pulp Press) — ISBN 9781551521893
- The Trial of Pope Benedict: Joseph Ratzinger and the Vatican's Assault on Reason, Compassion, and Human Dignity (2013, Arsenal Pulp Press) — ISBN 9781551525273
- Double Karma (2023, Cormorant Books) — ISBN 9781770866836
- Cutting Edge: Hockey as Queer Culture (2026, Arsenal Pulp Press) — ISBN 9781834050485
