= Christopher Paul Neil =

Canadian convicted serial child molester (born 1975)

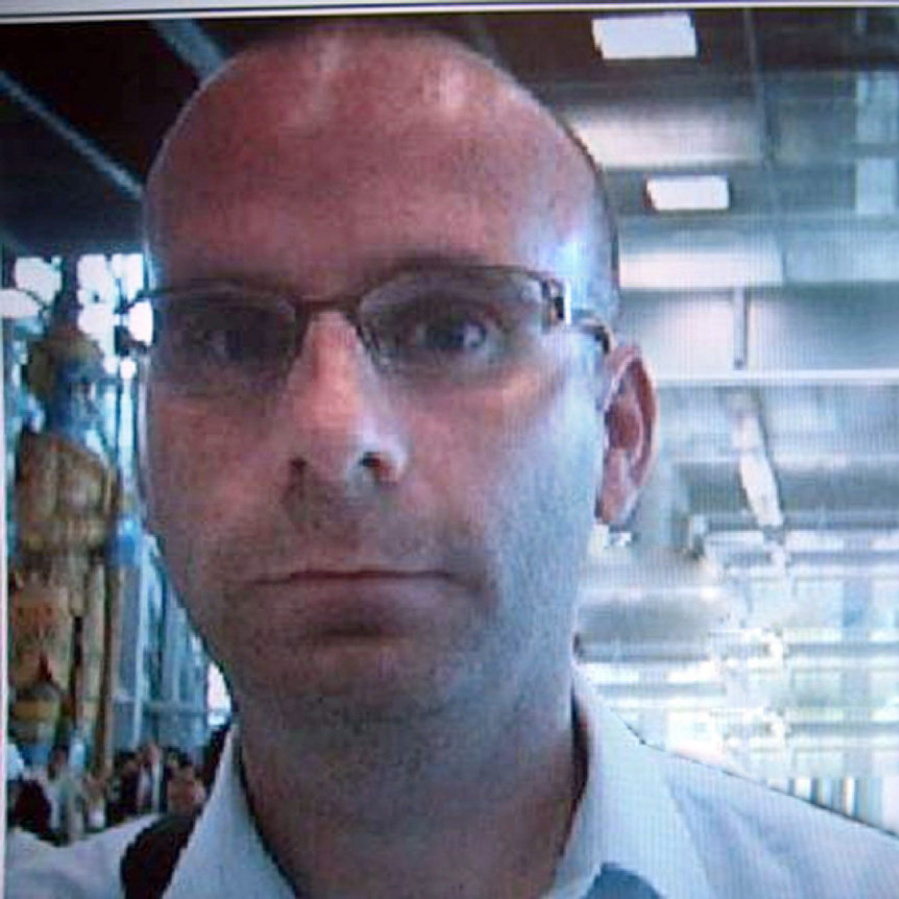
- Neil in 2007
- Born: February 6, 1975 (age 51); New Westminster, British Columbia, Canada
- Other name: Vico (Note: Nicknamed after the Interpol operation concerning him)
- Education: Handsworth Secondary School
- Occupation: Teacher
- Criminal information
- Status: Released on March 26, 2017; 9 years ago
- Convictions: Child sexual abuse; child abduction; child pornography
- Wanted by: Interpol; Royal Thai Police

Details
- Victims: At least 12 young boys in Vietnam, Cambodia, and Thailand
- Country: Thailand; Vietnam; Cambodia
- Target: Minor
- Date apprehended: October 19, 2007; 19 years ago in Thailand
- Imprisoned at: Thailand; Canada

Christopher Paul Neil (born February 6, 1975), known as Mr. Swirl Face prior to his identification, is a Canadian convicted sex offender and former teacher. He was the subject of a highly publicized Interpol investigation of the child sexual abuse of at least 12 young boys in Vietnam, Cambodia, and Thailand, primarily owing to the Internet release of child sexual abuse material. He was arrested by Royal Thai Police in October 2007.

== Early life and education ==
Neil was born in New Westminster, British Columbia, where he was raised. Christopher was later educated in Maple Ridge, British Columbia. He attended Handsworth Secondary School and graduated in 1993.

In 1998, he graduated from a seminary in Mission, British Columbia, with an arts degree, but did not receive the necessary approval to enter the Catholic priesthood due to a lack of qualifications. Following this, he chose to go into teaching instead.

== Career ==
Neil served as a chaplain at military cadet camps in Nova Scotia and Saskatchewan from 1997 to 2000, where he counselled teenagers.

=== Working as an English teacher in Asian countries ===
After serving as a chaplain, Neil moved to South Korea to teach English. He remained in South Korea before moving to Thailand in 2003.

In Thailand, Neil began working as an English teacher at a private school in Bangkok. He also began traveling to Vietnam and Cambodia, where he took pornographic photographs of young boys.

== Legal issues and convictions ==
=== Interpol search and capture ===
Neil appeared in more than 300 photographs depicting child sexual abuse, which surfaced on the Internet and led to a worldwide manhunt known as Operation Vico. Neil's face had been obscured by applying a digital swirl filter to the photographs. An expert in Germany was able to reverse the effect of the filter, making his face clearly visible.

Several of these reconstructed pictures were posted on Interpol's website and led to more than 350 people contacting the organization, five of whom identified the man as Neil. Neil was working as an English teacher at Kwangju Foreign School in the city of Gwangju, South Korea, at the time but fled to Thailand once he was publicly identified. He was arrested in the Nakhon Ratchasima province, Thailand, on October 19, 2007. Thai police reportedly located him by means of a trace on the mobile phone of his 25-year-old Thai partner, who was identified in Pattaya.

On January 11, 2008, the start of his trial was set for March 10. He pleaded not guilty. On March 10 it was found that Neil did not have a lawyer. One was assigned to him and the trial was adjourned to June 2. He was sentenced on August 15, 2008, to 39 months in prison and a $1,780 fine. His original sentence of six years was reduced by about half because he later admitted to the crime. On November 24, 2008, his sentence was extended by six years following his conviction for molesting another child.

=== Return to Canada ===
After five years' imprisonment in Thailand, on September 29, 2012, Neil returned to Canada, whereupon he was immediately arrested at Vancouver International Airport under a Criminal Code 810.1 warrant. On October 3, 2012, he was released from custody on strict conditions. On August 2, 2013, Neil was arrested at his home for breach of recognizance. He pleaded guilty in October. Child pornography was found on his laptop and his mobile phone. His sentencing occurred on May 6, 2014, at which time he received a prison sentence of three months' plus three years of probation for breach of conditions, namely "possessing devices capable of accessing the internet". Neil was already in custody, having been denied bail on April 10, 2014, pending a criminal trial stemming from additional child sex abuse offences he is alleged to have committed in Cambodia.

In December 2015, he was sentenced to five and a half years in prison by a British Columbia court, which was later reduced to 15 months.

He was released in March 2017 and is currently living in Vancouver with a court-ordered restriction on certain behaviours including "contact with minors in person or on the internet [...] [and] possessing or accessing any electronic device or from getting any other person to do so on his behalf."

=== Extended search for others ===
Thai police expanded the search for potential child sex offenders by publishing photographs of 50 Western suspects identified by international authorities, many of whom are German citizens. Other nationalities include British, Australian, Italian, Finnish and American.

On May 6, 2008, Interpol launched Operation IDent, its second public appeal to identify an unknown child abuse suspect, who featured in almost 100 images showing the sexual abuse of at least three boys between six and ten years old. Unlike Neil's case, there had been no apparent attempt to obscure the perpetrator's face in these images.

After authorities received more than 250 leads, Wayne Nelson Corliss was arrested by U.S. Immigration and Customs Enforcement agents in New Jersey and charged with producing child pornography. He admitted to raping three boys and was denied bail.
