= Carson Graham Secondary School =

Carson Graham World IB Secondary School

Location
- 2145 Jones Ave; North Vancouver, British Columbia, V7M 2W7; Canada; 49.3288°N 123.0824°W

Information
- School type: Public, high school
- Founded: 1965
- School district: School District 44 North Vancouver
- Superintendent: Pius Ryan
- Area trustee: Susan Skinner
- School number: 4444036
- Principal: Kim Jonat
- Staff: 60
- Grades: 8-12
- Enrollment: 1350 (September 10, 2016)
- Colours: White and Red
- Mascot: Eagle
- Team name: Eagles
- Website: carsongraham.ca

Carson Graham Secondary is a public high school in the city of North Vancouver, British Columbia and part of School District 44 North Vancouver.

== History ==
The school opened September 15, 1965, and is named after Dr. Carson Graham. In 2009, Carson Graham only offered grades eleven and twelve because of the construction work being done. All of the grade eight, nine, and ten students were sent to Balmoral Secondary.

== Academics ==
Carson Graham offers courses in a variety of subjects, including the humanities, sciences, language arts, business, fine arts and performing arts, engineering, leadership, and computer technology. Carson Graham is also an International Baccalaureate MYP and DP school.

== Safe and Active School Travel Program ==
In 2016–2017 the school was the first North Vancouver secondary school to participate in the Safe and Active School Travel Program, an 18-month program looking at school and neighbourhood transportation modes, safety, and opportunities.

== Notable alumni ==
- Coco Love Alcorn, singer
- Réal Andrews, actor, Class of 1981
- Shane Bunting, rapper known as Madchild
- Brent Charleton, former Australian National Basketball League player
- Paris Jackson, former CFL football player,
- Nina Kiri, actor
- Karen Magnussen, world figure skating champion
- Gabor Maté, former Carson English teacher, writer and physician
- Jerome Pathon, former NFL player
- Gregor Robertson, Canadian Minister of Housing and Infrastructure, and former mayor of Vancouver
- Anthony Sedlak, winner of Food Network's Superstar Chef Challenge II
- Glen Suitor, former CFL football player and sports broadcaster for TSN
- April Telek, actress
- Dominique Termansen, former CFL football player
- Rowan Wick, MLB pitcher in San Diego Padres organization
- Fred Winters, Olympian and professional volleyball player

== Athletics ==
The school has teams in football, rugby union, rowing, wrestling, volleyball, badminton, field hockey, ice hockey, basketball, swimming, mountain biking, ultimate frisbee, tennis and soccer. Track and field Past championships include:

- Rugby
  - AAA Boys Rugby Provincial Champions: 2008, 2006, 2002, 1996
  - AAA Girls Rugby Provincial Champions: 2017, 2016, 2012, 2011, 2010, 2009, 2008, 2007, 2006, 2004
- Wrestling
  - Provincial Boys Wrestling Champions: 1990 1992 1993 1995
  - Provincial Girls Wrestling Champions: 2009 2008, 2006, 2004
- Football
  - AAA Football Provincial Champions: 2001
  - AA Football Provincial Champions 2021, 2015
  - A Football Provincial Champions 1993
- Soccer
  - AAA Boys Soccer Provincial Champions: 2001

Soccer Provincial Champions : 1979–1980

- Field Hockey
  - AAA Women's field hockey Provincial Champions: 2011

The school's football, rugby, soccer, and field hockey teams play at Confederation Park.

Every year, the Carson Graham Eagles football team play their rivals, the Handsworth Royals, in the Buchanan Bowl. The very first Buchanan Bowl was played in 1987 and is named after Mr. James Buchanan, a teacher and administrator who worked at both schools and died in 1986.

== See also ==
Balmoral Jr Secondary School - Balmoral campus of Carson Graham school
