= Brent Charleton =

Canadian businessman and basketball player

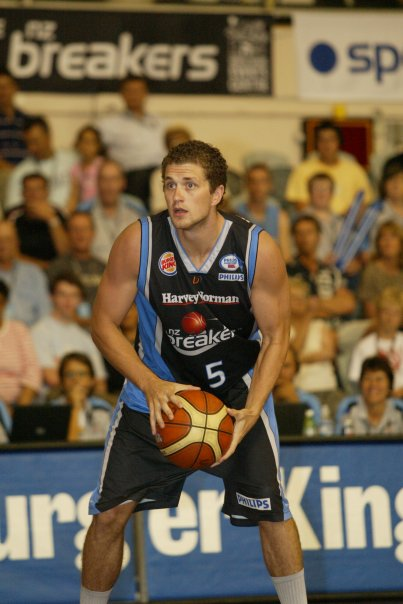
- Charleton with the New Zealand Breakers
- Born: Brent Charleton; 11 April 1982 (age 44); Burnaby, British Columbia, Canada
- Occupations: Senior Vice President, Sales and Business Development for EnWave Corporation
- Children: 1

Brent Charleton (born 11 April 1982) is a Canadian businessman and former basketball player who currently serves as the President and chief executive officer for an industrial technology company called EnWave Corporation.

After graduating from Simon Fraser University in 2005, Charleton was a professional basketball player for three consecutive years, competing in both the New Zealand National Basketball League and Australian National Basketball League.

== Early life and education ==
Brent Charleton was born in Burnaby, British Columbia, Canada. He is the oldest of three, having two younger sisters. His father has the New Zealand nationality, while his mother is Canadian.

After graduating from Carson Graham High School in 2000, Charleton attended Simon Fraser University, from which he graduated with a Bachelor of Arts degree and a Major in Criminology. While attending Simon Fraser University, he was President of the Student Athlete Council and Captain of the university's Varsity Men's Basketball Team. He passed the school's all-time scoring record set by Jay Triano - Triano set the record over four seasons while Charleton's mark was set over five.

== Professional basketball career ==
At Simon Fraser University Charleton contacted the only New Zealand basketball team that also played in the Australian National Basketball League, the New Zealand Breakers. This led to a tryout in China, where the New Zealand Breakers were touring. Following that tour, Charleton was asked to play for the North Harbour Heat in the National Basketball League (NBL) – the New Zealand basketball league. He played for the North Harbour Heat in the 2005 and 2006 seasons.

Also in 2005, Charleton made his New Zealand national team debut for the Tall Blacks. As his father is a New Zealander, he qualified to play for the country.

After 2006, he played a season for the Otago Nuggets, a New Zealand basketball team based in Dunedin in the south of New Zealand. Finally, he played three seasons for the New Zealand Breakers back in Auckland.

Despite the successes in the NBL, Charleton decided to return to Canada in 2008 to focus on his education and business career.

== British Columbia Institute of Technology ==
Between September 2008 and May 2010, Charleton was a student of the Marketing Management Diploma program at the British Columbia Institute of Technology (BCIT), where he focused on Entrepreneurship.

In addition, as president of Students in Free Enterprise at BCIT he managed over 100 members and completed 13 socially responsible projects. These projects generated over $800,000 in economic activity.

He graduated with distinction, as one of the top students within the business program. During the two year time frame he received several scholarships, and was awarded the BCIT Alumni Outstanding Student Leadership Award.

This led to Charleton being hired at EnWave Corporation as a marketing coordinator in March 2010, and he became CEO of the company in 2018.

== Social and personal life ==
Charleton is a volunteer mentor for the well-known business education program Junior Achievement, where he mentors high school students on how to start and structure a business. In addition, he has volunteered as an assistant basketball coach at Carson Graham Secondary School. He is married and has one daughter.
