= Indigo Diaz =

Canadian baseball player (born 1998)

Free agent
- Pitcher
- Born: October 14, 1998 (age 27); North Vancouver, British Columbia, Canada
- Bats: Right Throws: Right
- Stats at Baseball Reference

Indigo Dunham Diaz (born October 14, 1998) is a Canadian professional baseball pitcher who is a free agent.

== Career ==
=== Amateur ===
Diaz played Little League baseball with the Forest Hills team, then participated in the British Columbia Premier Baseball League as a member of the North Shore Twins and Coquitlam Reds. He attended Handsworth Secondary School, and continued playing baseball. Diaz began his collegiate baseball career at Iowa Western Community College, where he pitched two seasons, then transferred to the Michigan State Spartans baseball team. In the midst of his junior season with the Spartans, Diaz became the team's closer. Diaz was subsequently selected by the Atlanta Braves in the 27th round of the 2019 Major League Baseball draft.

=== Atlanta Braves ===
Diaz started his professional career with the Gulf Coast League Braves after signing with the Atlanta Braves organization. Due to the COVID-19 pandemic the 2020 minor league season was cancelled. Diaz began the 2021 season at the High-A level with the Rome Braves. He threw 18 walks over 18 relief appearances, spanning 27 innings. Diaz was promoted to the Double-A Mississippi Braves in July 2021.

Diaz spent the 2022 season with Mississippi, compiling a 3-4 record and 3.08 ERA with 63 strikeouts and four saves in 49 2/3 innings pitched across 49 relief appearances.

=== New York Yankees ===
On December 28, 2022, the Braves traded Diaz and Caleb Durbin to the New York Yankees for Lucas Luetge. In 2023, he made 23 appearances split between the High–A Hudson Valley Renegades and Somerset Patriots, posting a cumulative 4.26 ERA with 43 strikeouts and 3 saves in 31 2/3 innings pitched. On August 1, 2023, Diaz underwent Tommy John surgery, ending his season.

Diaz returned to action in 2024 with the rookie-level Florida Complex League Yankees and Hudson Valley. In 14 appearances (three starts) for the two affiliates, he recorded a cumulative 1.80 ERA with 19 strikeouts over 15 innings of work.

Diaz made 42 appearances for Double-A Somerset in 2025, compiling an 8-3 record and 2.58 ERA with 46 strikeouts and six saves across 52 1/3 innings pitched. He elected free agency following the season on November 6, 2025.

=== Arizona Diamondbacks ===
On December 24, 2025, Diaz signed a minor league contract with the Arizona Diamondbacks. He made 23 appearances for the Double–A Amarillo Sod Poodles, compiling a 4–2 record and 13.69 ERA with 24 strikeouts and one save across 23 2/3 innings pitched. Diaz was released by the Diamondbacks organization on July 13, 2026.
