= Peter Jepson-Young =

Canadian medical doctor

- Born: June 8, 1957; New Westminster, British Columbia, Canada
- Died: November 15, 1992 (aged 35); Vancouver, British Columbia, Canada
- Cause of death: AIDS
- Occupation: Doctor
- Known for: The Dr. Peter Diaries, documenting his experiences living with AIDS

Peter Jepson-Young, M.D. (June 8, 1957 – November 15, 1992), better known as Dr. Peter, was a Canadian medical doctor who promoted HIV/AIDS awareness and education in the early 1990s through his regular segment on CBC Television news broadcasts called The Dr. Peter Diaries. In this series, Dr. Peter documented his own experiences as a person with AIDS. A documentary of his life made the year after his death was nominated for an Academy Award.

== Background ==
He was born in New Westminster, British Columbia, in 1957 and raised in Nanaimo and North Vancouver, British Columbia. After graduation in 1975 from Delbrook Senior Secondary School in North Vancouver, he attended medical school at the University of British Columbia in the 1980s and did his residency in Ottawa, Ontario. On September 29, 1986, he was diagnosed with AIDS, soon after completing his medical training.

In 1992, Jepson-Young had survived with an AIDS diagnosis longer than any person in British Columbia.

In 2011, a memorial to Jepson-Young was installed in St. Paul's Anglican Church, Vancouver.

== The Dr. Peter Diaries ==
By 1989, Jepson-Young was unable to continue his medical practice due to his failing health. Turning his attention to AIDS education, in 1990 Jepson-Young began the Dr. Peter Diaries with five episodes airing on the CBC Early Evening News . Through these short segments, in which he was only referred to as “Dr. Peter”, he shared his experiences with the general public. Dr. Peter continued the series through 111 episodes from September 1990 up to his death in November 1992.

In 1993, The Broadcast Tapes of Dr. Peter was nominated for an Academy Award for Best Documentary Feature.

Journalist Daniel Gawthrop published a biography, Affirmation: The AIDS Odyssey of Dr. Peter, in 1994.

== Foundation and Dr. Peter Centre ==
Shortly before his death, Jepson-Young established the Dr. Peter AIDS Foundation. The foundation established the Dr. Peter Centre, consisting of a 24-hour specialized nursing care residence and day health program dedicated to helping those with HIV/AIDS.
