= Mike Warren (designer) =

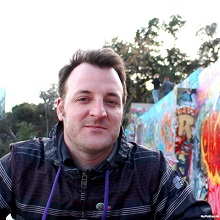
- Born: Michael Warren; 22 August 1980 (age 45)
- Other names: mikeasaurus, dinosaur mike
- Occupations: Designer, artist, fabricator, author, educator
- Years active: 2005 - present
- Works: Glow table, head in jar prank, flamethrower skateboard, iStab, dinosaur heels, nitro coffee
- Movement: maker culture, DIY ethic, open source
- Awards: New York Times Magazine Innovation Whiteboard winner
- Website: michaelsaurus.com

Mike Warren (born August 22, 1980) is a product designer, inventor, and best-selling author based in San Francisco. He builds functional open source prototypes in line with the maker culture, and are carefully documented to inspire others to follow along. As an advocate for sharing educational content, his work aims to lower the barrier to participation, and transfer a static audience to an active participant.

His most notable designs include the Glow Table, a glow in the dark (phosphorescence) table made from photoluminescent powder mixed with clear casting resin set into Pecky Cypress, and the Flamethrower Skateboard, a skateboard with a built in fuel delivery system with an ignitor that leaves a trail of fire behind it when riding.

Mike Warren is the author of several published maker books for all ages, and has also designed and edited two books for Instructables.

== Achievements ==
In 2020, Warren collaborated with the Bay Area Discovery Museum to create an exhibit loosely based on his book, Cut In Half: The Hidden World Inside Everyday Objects. The How Things Work exhibit displays everyday household items cut in half.

Warren won The New York Times Innovation Whiteboard in 2012 for his umbrella light, an illumination device retrofitted into the shaft of an umbrella to indicate location to others in the dark. This product was selected by James Dyson, calling it "a good precaution for pedestrians at night or in fog — and a bright idea in the evolution of the umbrella."

== Notable Projects ==
Mike Warren has built videos available on his YouTube channel.

Warren released the Flamethrower Skateboard in 2017, a skateboard that leaves a fire trail similar to the DeLorean time machine from the Back To The Future movies. The dangerous nature of the skateboard has received mostly positive reviews, with some critical about the safety of leaving unattended flames and the risk of starting fires.

In 2014, Warren created a glow in the dark (phosphorescence) table made from photoluminescent powder mixed with clear casting resin set into Pecky Cypress. This table was later republished in Wired UK magazine in 2015. The video tutorial has over 2.5 million views.

In 2014, Warren built a centrifuge from an old circular saw. The centrifuge was designed as a molecular gastronomy experiment to separate food, and can achieve 1800 g-force.

In 2012, Warren was featured in Popular Science Magazine for his project concealing a battery operated soldering iron inside an airsoft gun. The airsoft pistol had a removable ammunition clip which the batteries for the soldering iron were hidden, the trigger action activated the soldering iron.

== Published works ==
- DIY Wilderness Survival Projects: 15 Step-By-Step Projects for the Great Outdoors (Maker) (2021) - Welbeck Publishing, 160 pages, ISBN 1787398188
- Cut In Half: The Hidden World Inside Everyday Objects (2018) - Chronicle Books, 144 pages, ISBN 1452168628
- Dude Crafts: The Man's Guide to Practical Projects, Backyard Ballistics, and Glorious Gags (2018) - Voyageur Press; New edition, 192 pages, ISBN 0760357781
- The Gadget Inventor Handbook (2017) - Sterling Children's Books, 64 pages, ISBN 978-1454923473
- 23 Things To Do Before You are 11 1/2 (2015) - QEB Publishing, 64 pages, ISBN 978-1609928254
- Office Weapons (2013) - Skyhorse Publishing, 160 pages, ISBN 978-1620877081
- Backyard Rockets (2013) - Skyhorse Publishing, 208 pages, ISBN 978-1620877302
