= Handsworth Secondary School =

Public high school in North Vancouver, British Columbia, Canada

Coordinates: 49°21′4″N 123°6′4″W

Location
- 1033 Handsworth Road; North Vancouver, British Columbia, V7R 2A7; Canada

Information
- School type: Public, high school
- Founded: 1961
- School board: School District 44 North Vancouver
- Superintendent: Pius Ryan
- Area trustee: Linda Munro
- Principal: Cary Hungle
- Grades: 8–12
- Enrollment: 1,640
- Language: English; French
- Hours in school day: 6.5 - 5.8
- Colours: Blue and Gold
- Team name: Handsworth Royals
- Website: www.sd44.ca/school/handsworth/Pages/default.aspx

Handsworth Secondary School is a high school in the district of North Vancouver, British Columbia, Canada, and part of School District 44 North Vancouver. As of September 2025, the school reported 1,640 students enrolled in Grades 8–12, the largest school in the North Vancouver School District. On January 15, 2018, it was announced that construction of a new school to replace the existing 57 year old building was expected to start in 2019. The construction was delayed and started in March 2020. The new school began operation on February 7, 2022.

The school has had trouble securing a sports field since its rebuild. A grass field opened in March 2024, though it was quickly closed again in June due to frequent flooding. The field re-opened for September 2024, though it still suffered from inundation during rainfall. In October 2025, construction began on a turf field, which was completed in August 2026. Construction on a fieldhouse with washrooms is ongoing as of October 2026.

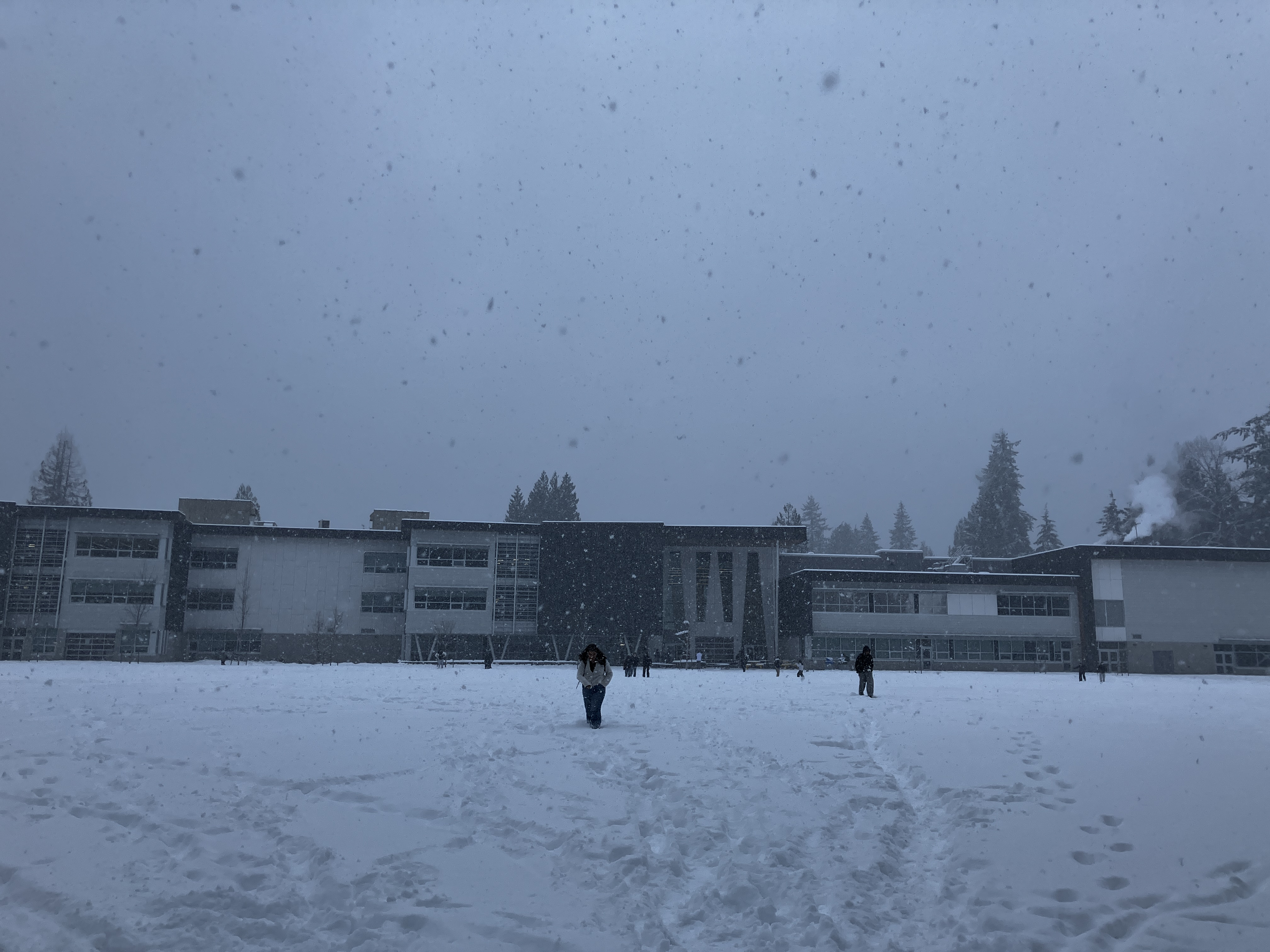
The new Handsworth school building during a rare snowstorm.

Handsworth Secondary School is within proximity to the Upper Mackay Creek Park. It is also located within 5 minutes' drive of Grouse Mountain to the north and the Capilano Suspension Bridge in the south. The school is accessible via Capilano Road, exit 14 off BC Highway 1. The nearest public transit routes are TransLink Buses #232 and #236 which stop at the corner of Capilano and Handsworth Road, a short walk from the school. Bus route #246 is also reasonably accessible by crossing the Mackay Creek valley.

== Academics ==
Handsworth offers courses in the humanities, sciences, language arts, business, marketing, fine and performing arts, textiles, woodwork, and computer technology. The performing arts program performs an original play every year and have recently moved their productions from the Centennial community theatre into a new school theatre.

Handsworth also offers several Advanced Placement courses and exams sittings annually.

== Athletics ==
The school has teams in football, rugby union, wrestling, volleyball, field hockey, basketball, swimming, mountain biking and soccer.

Every year, the Carson Graham Eagles football team play their rivals, the Handsworth Royals, in the Buchanan Bowl. The very first Buchanan Bowl was played in 1987 and is named after James Buchanan, a teacher and administrator who worked at both schools and died in 1986.

Handsworth won the 2006 BC Senior Boys AAA Basketball Tournament after defeating Kitsilano Secondary School with a score of 82–65. Handsworth was led by former Los Angeles Lakers center Robert Sacre who was named MVP of the game. Sacre contributed 17 points, grabbed 12 rebounds, and blocked four shots that game. That season, he averaged 25 points, 12 rebounds, and four and a half blocks per game. This marks the only tournament victory for Handsworth. Since their lone championship, they’ve been to the tournament 5 more times placing 8th (2008), 9th (2013), and 4th (2020).

Past BC championships include:

- 2014 – Field Hockey - Senior Girls AAA
- 2013 – Field Hockey - Senior Girls AAA
- 2011 – Field Hockey - Senior Girls AAA
- 2011 – Field Hockey - Senior Girls AAA
- 2010 – Volleyball – Senior Girls AAA
- 2010 – Basketball – Senior Girls AAA
- 2010 – Football – Bantam Boys
- 2009 – Volleyball – Senior Girls AAA
- 2009 – Soccer – Senior Girls AAA
- 2009 – Basketball – Senior Girls AAA
- 2008 – Volleyball – Senior Girls AAA
- 2008 – Soccer – Senior Boys AAA
- 2007 – Football – Senior Boys AA
- 2007 – Volleyball – Junior Girls AAA
- 2006 – Soccer – Senior Boys AAA
- 2006 – Basketball – Senior Boys AAA
- 1996 – Football – Senior Boys AA
- 1993 – Volleyball – Senior Girls AAA
- 1982 – Track and Field – Senior Boys/Girls
- 1981 – Track and Field (tied with Burnaby Central) – Senior Girls/Boys
- 1979 – Football – Senior Boys
- 1973 – Football – Senior Boys
- 1970 – Football – JV Boys
- 1970 – Basketball - Bantam Boys

== Notable alumni ==
- Darcy James Argue, Grammy nominated composer, bandleader of Secret Society
- Mike Ayley, bass player for Marianas Trench
- Cameron Bancroft, actor
- Theo Benedet, football player, UBC Thunderbirds, signed with the Chicago Bears of the NFL, field athlete in shot put.
- Laila Biali, Juno Award winning pianist, singer-songwriter, host of CBC Radio's Saturday Night Jazz
- Ian Bird, 2-time Olympian
- Laura Bruneau, actress,
- Sarah Chalke, actress,
- Indigo Diaz, baseball player
- Brandi Disterheft, bassist and composer
- Blythe Hartley, 3-time Olympian and bronze medalist
- Martin Jones, professional ice hockey goalie for the San Jose Sharks and 2013-14 Stanley Cup winner
- Lise Leveille, Olympian
- Mike Mahood, 2-time Olympian
- Colin McKay, professional skateboarder
- Brent McMahon, 2-time Olympian
- Peter Milkovich, 2-time Olympian
- Christopher Paul Neil, serial convicted child molester.
- John JP Poliquin, Juno Award nominated & MMVA winning music video director, filmmaker
- John Pyper-Ferguson, actor
- Anna Rice, 2-time Olympian
- Renee Rosnes, jazz musician
- Robert Sacre, professional basketball player who last played for the NBA's New Orleans Pelicans
- Mason Trafford, professional soccer player
- Mike Warren, professional designer and author for maker culture, and New York Times award winning inventor.
- Paul Wettlaufer, 2-time Olympian
- Keelan White, professional Canadian football player
