= The Broadcast Tapes of Dr. Peter =

1993 film

- Produced by: Arthur Ginsberg; David Paperny
- Starring: Peter Jepson-Young
- Production company: Paperny Films
- Distributed by: CBC; Direct Cinema Limited
- Release date: July 1, 1993
- Running time: 45 minutes
- Country: Canada
- Language: English

The Broadcast Tapes of Dr. Peter is a 1993 Canadian documentary film produced by Arthur Ginsberg. It was nominated for an Academy Award for Best Documentary Feature. The film is based upon the video diary of Peter Jepson-Young, better known as "Dr. Peter", which documented his life as a person with AIDS.

The film was originally broadcast as an episode of the CBC Television documentary series Witness, and was later picked up for broadcast in the United States by HBO.
