= Seycove Secondary School =

Seycove Secondary
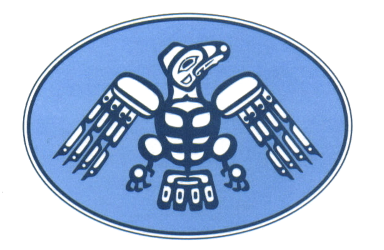

Location
- 1204 Caledonia Avenue; North Vancouver, British Columbia, V7G 2A6; Canada; 49.3184°N 122.9505°W

Information
- School type: High school
- Established: c. 1979
- School district: School District 44 North Vancouver
- Superintendent: Pius Ryan
- Area trustee: George Tsiakos
- Principal: Meghan Downie
- Grades: 8-12
- Enrollment: 613 (2025/2026)
- Language: English
- Hours in school day: 6
- Area: Deep Cove
- Colour: Navy
- Mascot: The Seyhawk
- Team name: The Seyhawks
- Feeder schools: Cove Cliff Dorothy Lynas Sherwood Park
- Website: seycove.ca

Seycove Secondary School, also known as Seycove at sə́yəmətən, is a Canadian high school in the Deep Cove neighbourhood of the District of North Vancouver, British Columbia. Located just east of Dollarton Highway, the school has a student population of approximately 500 students in grades 8 through 12. Seycove is part of the SD44 program called a family of schools (FOS). Seycove acts as the family school for the Elementary schools considered the feeder schools including Dorothy Lynas, Cove Cliff, and Sherwood Park. On June 3, 2022, the Tsleli-Waututh first nation gifted the school the name "Seycove at sə́yəmətən", meaning "place of good water". The name was chosen as it was the name of the original Indigenous village on which the school resides.

== Athletics ==
Seycove Secondary offers many sports ranging from golf to rugby. The teams include badminton, gymnastics, basketball, soccer, volleyball, mountain biking, swimming, cross country, skiing and snowboarding, golf, tennis, field hockey, track and field, and rugby.

The ski and snowboard team has won the district championship two years in a row. The gymnastics team has qualified for provincials almost every year. The cross country team has won the AA division banner recently for three consecutive years as well as having many athletes qualify for provincials. The rugby team has had two championship seasons back-to-back, winning the Tier Two “New Zealand Shield” and maintaining it the following year. As for the soccer teams, the Senior Boys soccer team has won provincials and placed third during the 2009 provincials. The Senior Girls soccer team has also won provincials. Seycove's rowing team came in first place in the district many years in a row. The Senior boys and Junior boys basketball teams are both highly ranked within their leagues. The Senior girls basketball team also ranks highly, usually in the top 15, and they won the provincial championships in 2017.

In 2023, the Senior Girls Field Hockey team won the BC Provincial Championships.

== Music ==
The school has several choirs and vocal groups including an intermediate and senior vocal jazz program. Its band program includes courses in concert band and jazz band. Concert Band offers students an opportunity to learn music fundamentals and improve their ability to perform in a large group setting. Jazz Band is an advanced enrichment course.
