= H. Carson Graham =

- Born: August 3, 1899; Kemptville, Ontario, Canada
- Died: July 14, 1959 (aged 59); North Vancouver, British Columbia, Canada
- Occupation: Doctor

Howard Carson Graham (August 3, 1899 – July 14, 1959), known as H. Carson Graham, was a Canadian physician. He was born to a farming family in Kemptville, south of Ottawa, Ontario, in 1899. After graduating with a medical degree from McGill University, Graham moved to North Vancouver to practise medicine in 1924.

Carson Graham was elected to the North Vancouver Board of Education in 1944 and served continuously until 1958.

Graham was a member of the North Vancouver Board of Trade and a director of the Seamen's Institute. He was the ship's doctor and medical officer to the police on the North Shore.

At the time of his death from a heart attack in 1959, Graham was the Chief of Medical Staff at North Vancouver General Hospital. He was actively involved in the building of the current Lions Gate Hospital.

Carson Graham Secondary School was named for him as a tribute to his contribution to the North Vancouver community.
