= School District 44 North Vancouver =

School district in British Columbia, Canada

North Vancouver School District No. 44

Location
- North Vancouver Metro Vancouver Canada

District information
- Superintendent: Pius Ryan
- Budget: CA$236 million (2023–24 fiscal year)

Students and staff
- Staff: 16,000+ students and 2,600+ staff

Other information
- Website: sd44.ca

North Vancouver School District 44 is a school district (also "NVSD") in North Vancouver, British Columbia, Canada.

The district contains 25 elementary schools, seven secondary schools, and one online school; there are approximately 16,000 students and 2,600 staff.

With an annual budget of over $235 million (2023–24 fiscal year), the North Vancouver School District manages public schools in the City of North Vancouver and District of North Vancouver and is governed by the North Vancouver Board of Education, which is composed of seven elected trustees. Each of the secondary schools enrols between 70–100 international students, and each elementary school enrols a maximum of 20 international students. All teachers are BC-government certified.

== Schools ==
| School | Location | Grades |
|---|---|---|
| Argyle Secondary School | North Vancouver | 8–12 |
| Blueridge Elementary School | North Vancouver | K–7 |
| Boundary Elementary School | North Vancouver | K–7 |
| Braemar Elementary School | North Vancouver | K–7 |
| Brooksbank Elementary School | North Vancouver | K–7 |
| Canyon Heights Elementary School | North Vancouver | K–7 |
| Capilano Elementary School | North Vancouver | K–7 |
| Carisbrooke Elementary School | North Vancouver | K–7 |
| Carson Graham Secondary School | North Vancouver | 8–12 |
| Cleveland Elementary School | North Vancouver | K–7 |
| Cloverley Elementary School | North Vancouver | K–5 |
| Cove Cliff Elementary School | North Vancouver | K–7 |
| Dorothy Lynas Elementary School | North Vancouver | K–7 |
| Eastview Elementary School | North Vancouver | K–7 |
| Handsworth Secondary School | North Vancouver | 8–12 |
| Highlands Elementary School | North Vancouver | K–7 |
| Larson Elementary School | North Vancouver | K–7 |
| Lynn Valley Elementary School | North Vancouver | K–7 |
| Lynnmour Xá7elcha Elementary School | North Vancouver | K–7 |
| Montroyal Elementary School | North Vancouver | K–7 |
| Mountainside Secondary School | North Vancouver | 8–12 |
| Norgate Xwemélch’stn Community Elementary School | North Vancouver | K–7 |
| North Vancouver Online Learning | North Vancouver | Provincial Online Learning School |
| Queen Mary Community Elementary School | North Vancouver | K–7 |
| Queensbury Elementary School | North Vancouver | K–7 |
| Ridgeway Elementary School | North Vancouver | K–7 |
| Ross Road Elementary School | North Vancouver | K–7 |
| Seycove Secondary School | North Vancouver | 8–12 |
| Seymour Heights Elementary School | North Vancouver | K–7 |
| Sherwood Park Elementary School | North Vancouver | K–7 |
| Summer Learning | North Vancouver | Summer Learning |
| Sutherland Secondary School | North Vancouver | 8–12 |
| Upper Lynn Elementary School | North Vancouver | K–7 |
| Westview Elementary School | North Vancouver | K–7 |
| Windsor Secondary School | North Vancouver | 8–12 |

== Closed schools ==
- Balmoral Junior Secondary School - 1959–2009, later replaced with Mountainside Secondary School
- District Diagnostic Centre (“DC1”), a specialized education setting for severe learning disabled (SLD) children - 1994 - closed for financial reasons
- Delbrook Senior Secondary School - 1957–1977 closed due to fire.
- Plymouth Elementary School - closed for financial reasons
- Ridgeway Annex
- Keith Lynn Alternative Secondary School - demolished for new highway interchange
- Fromme Elementary
- Cloverley Elementary

== See also ==
- List of school districts in British Columbia
