= Windsor Secondary School =

School in North Vancouver, British Columbia, Canada

Coordinates: 49.31412°N 122.99779°W

Location
- 931 Broadview Drive; North Vancouver, British Columbia, V7H 2E9; Canada

Information
- School type: Public, high school
- Founded: 1961
- School board: School District 44 North Vancouver
- Superintendent: Pius Ryan
- Area trustee: George Tsiakos
- Grades: 8-12
- Enrollment: 950 (2007)
- Language: English and French immersion
- Area: North Vancouver - Seymour
- Colours: Green and gold
- Mascot: Wolves
- Team name: Wolves
- Website: nvsd44.bc.ca

Windsor Secondary School is a high school in North Vancouver, British Columbia, Canada.

== Description ==
Founded in 1961, Windsor Secondary School has an enrollment of 950 students as of 2007. In 2009, Windsor introduced a French immersion program.

Windsor Secondary is constructed entirely out of steel and concrete and consists of six floors, along with three additional wings. It also has an artificial turf field and 'the Windsor Bubble', which is an outdoor field inside a sort of white 'bubble', hence the name.

== Sports ==
Windsor is known for its AA senior football team, the "Wolves" (formerly "Dukes"), who have been successful in the past decade, as well as the juniors who won a AA Provincial Championship in 2008 and 2015. The Senior Dukes brought back another championship to Windsor with their historic 2017 Season going undefeated (10-0) and breaking the Windsor record for highest scoring game beating the Ballenas Whalers (61-14). The Dukes beat Abbotsford Secondary 44–19 in the Subway Bowl with the majority of their roster winning their second provincial title. Later "Varsity letters" published an article about the team and hinted at the possibility of them being one of the greatest AA teams in history. They also have multiple other strong sports teams and programs, including gymnastics, ultimate frisbee, mountain biking, skiing/snowboarding, hockey, and wrestling.

In 2023, the school opted to rename all of its athletics teams from "Dukes" to "Wolves" in response to a demand from the school's First Nations students, who cited the name's colonial and imperial connotations. The change was officially implemented at the start of the 2024 academic year.

== Programs ==
The school holds a Hockey Academy program, where students can build their hockey skills. This course replaces Physical Education.

In 2012, a Soccer Academy was introduced which allows students to build upon their soccer skills instead of taking the standard physical education curriculum, much like the Hockey Academy program.

Windsor also has a "Peak Performance Program" for high performance athletes. This allows athletes to attend 3 classes a day instead of 4, and leave at 12:50 to train in their sport of choice. This process requires a letter from the sporting organization the student plays for, verifying their enrollment, as well as acceptance from the school.

Windsor's music program is one of the city's strongest. About 1 out of every 3 students are in either band or choir, and the Jazz Band has consistently ranked highly at competitions and festivals.
